= Sant'Andrea di Compito =

- Frazione
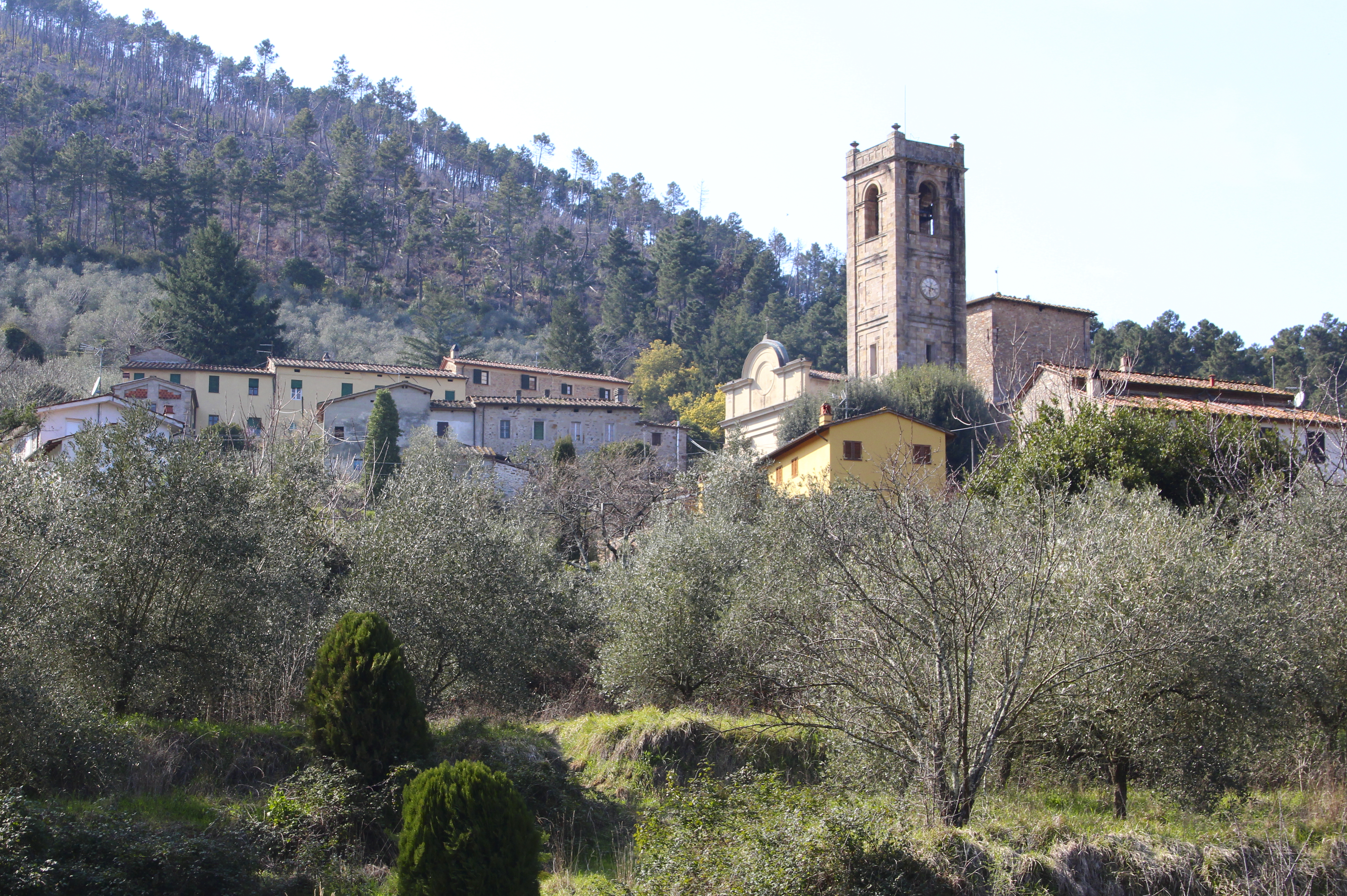
- Panorama of Sant'Andrea di Compito

- Location of Sant'Andrea di Compito in Italy
- Coordinates: 43°47′03″N 10°33′37″E
- Country: Italy
- Region: Tuscany
- Province: Lucca (LU)
- Comune: Capannori
- Elevation: 150 m (490 ft)

Population
  - Total: 250
- Time zone: UTC+1 (CET)
  - Summer (DST): UTC+2 (CEST)
- Postal code: 55062
- Dialing code: (+39) 0583

Sant'Andrea di Compito (also Sant'Andrea di Cómpito) is a frazione of Capannori in the province of Lucca region of Tuscany in Italy. The settlement styles itself The Village of Camellias as it is home to an exceptional collection of ancient Camellia Cultivars which attract visitors annually.

== Geography ==
Sant'Andrea di Compito lies approximately 6 km (4 mi) south of the town of Capannori, 10 km (6 mi) south-east of the provincial capital Lucca and 55 km (34 mi) west of the regional capital Florence. The hamlet lies on a foothill north of the Monte Pisanino not far from the southeastern lake Lago di Bientina (Lago di Sesto, municipality of Bientina) and the plain of Piana Lucchese. Sant'Andrea di Compito is situated northwest of Castelvecchio di Compito, and northwest of Colle di Compito, its neighbouring settlements and administrative frazioni.

=== Climate ===
Data following is from the weather station located nearby in Pieve di Compito:

Parish of Compito	Jan	Feb	Mar	Apr	Mau	Jun	Jul	Aug	Sep	Oct	Nov	Dec
Mean Maximum (°C)	10.7	11.8	15.0	18.6	22.9	26.7	30.2	30.4	26.6	20.9	15.1	11.5
Mean Minimum (°C)	1.4	2.1	4.3	7.0	10.5	13.8	16.4	16.3	13.2	9.3	5.6	2.5

== Points of interest ==
=== Camellietum Compitese ===
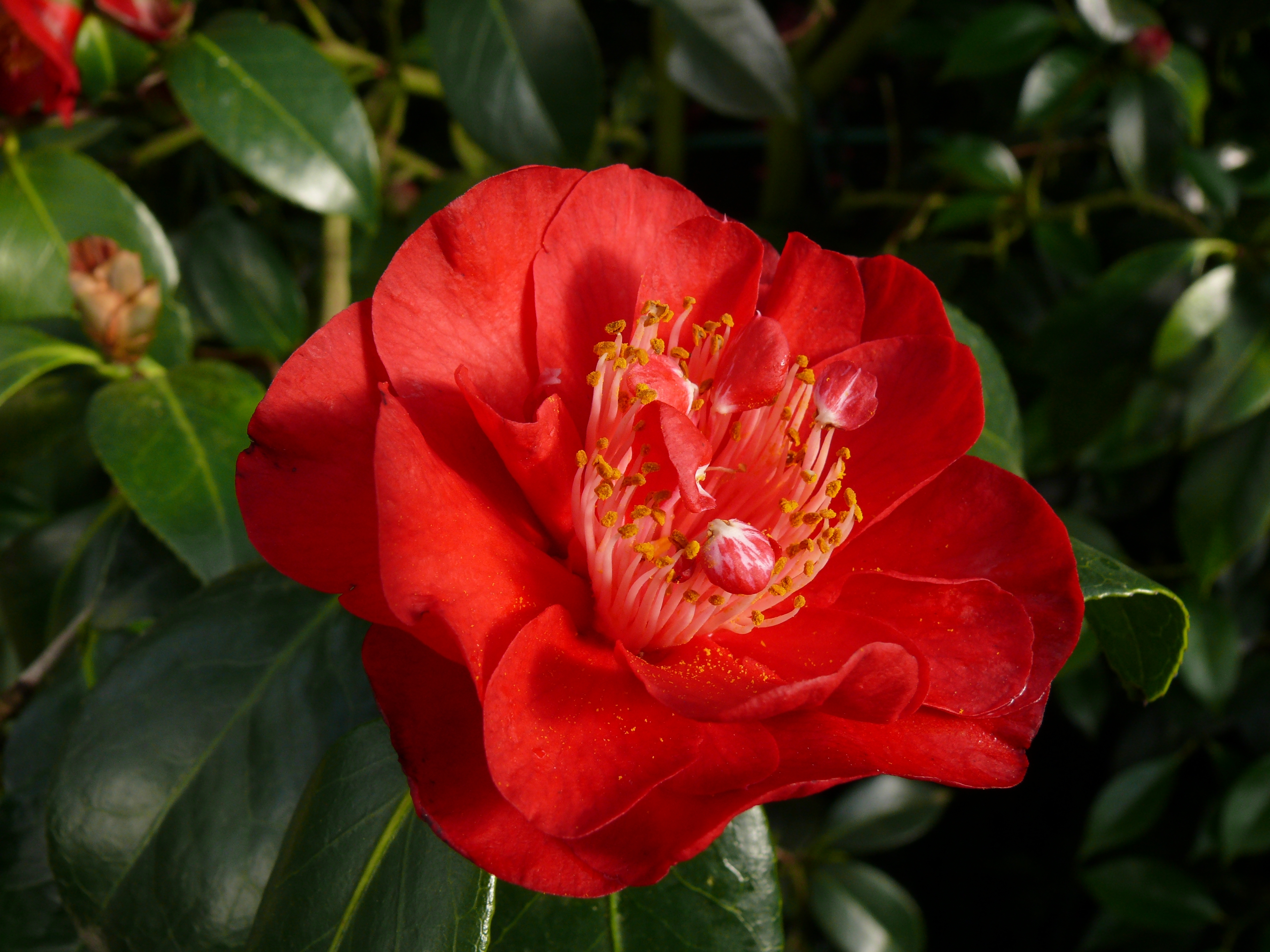
Camellia japonica

Sant'Andrea di Compito's particular semi-humid microclimate makes it particularly fertile. During the eighteenth century, noble and wealthy individuals built numerous luxurious villas in the town with gardens featuring ornamental plants of the genus Camellia, for which a fashion developed and reached a peak in the mid-19th century. Starting with ancient varieties, imported to Italy from locations including Japan, enthusiasts developed numerous artificial varieties (cultivars) with enhanced flowers and foliage. Today very few of the original varieties remain outside Sant'Andrea di Compito so this botanical heritage, together with the availability of water, ideal climate and appropriate landscape of a terrace on the slopes of Monte Serra, presented an opportunity to create a world class garden of excellence with educational interpretation for visitors. In 2006, the Camelieto was inaugurated with around 150 plants and 120 different cultivars, by 2011 expanding to 1,000 plants and 750 cultivars, on an area that has grown from 2,000 to 7,250 square metres (21,500 to 78,000 sq ft). Every spring, the Camilieto and villas in Sant'Andrea di Compito host the Exhibition of the Ancient Camellias of Lucca which attracts up to 10,000 visitors over its four weekends duration. Italy's only tea plantation, which began with tea made from Camellia, is located at the Antica Chiusa Borrini.

=== Parliament Square ===
Now a small square, La Piazza del Parlamento was once larger and the heart of the local community. Documents from the thirteenth century record public auctions, business negotiations, religious ceremonies and social gatherings taking place here, governed by the ordinances of the leaders of the community posted on the door of the Palazzo del Commissario. This building, now practically unrecognizable, was located on the north side of Parliament Square and was, until 1800, the office of a Commissioner sent by Lucca to manage local administration and to deliver justice (except for the death penalty.) The village was not easy to manage and violence was common. After 1800, the Commissioner was replaced by a justice of the peace.

Towards the south of the square, the Church of San Colombano existed from the tenth century onwards. Over the centuries it was repeatedly abandoned, then partially restored, used as a school, a warehouse, a cafe (the Caffe del parlamento), a ballroom, a puppet theater and a performance space for local amateur dramatics. Today it is a bar with original structures hardly recognizable except for a gravestone still partially visible in the current warehouse.

=== Villa Torregrossa ===
This villa was built alongside Parliament Square during the 1700s, incorporating pre-existing medieval buildings. Later, the purchase of part of Parliament Square by the owner of the villa gave space for a garden that still holds rare specimens of ancient camellias and other plant varieties, including a significant Osmanthus fragrans. For several years before his death, mathematician Mario Pieri resided in the villa as a guest of his sister Gemma Pieri Campetti and her husband, Umberto, a lawyer. Pieri was buried at the church of Sant'Andrea di Compito before his remains were transferred to the monumental cemetery in Lucca. During World War II, the villa was requisitioned by the occupying German command.

=== Ancient Signal Tower ===
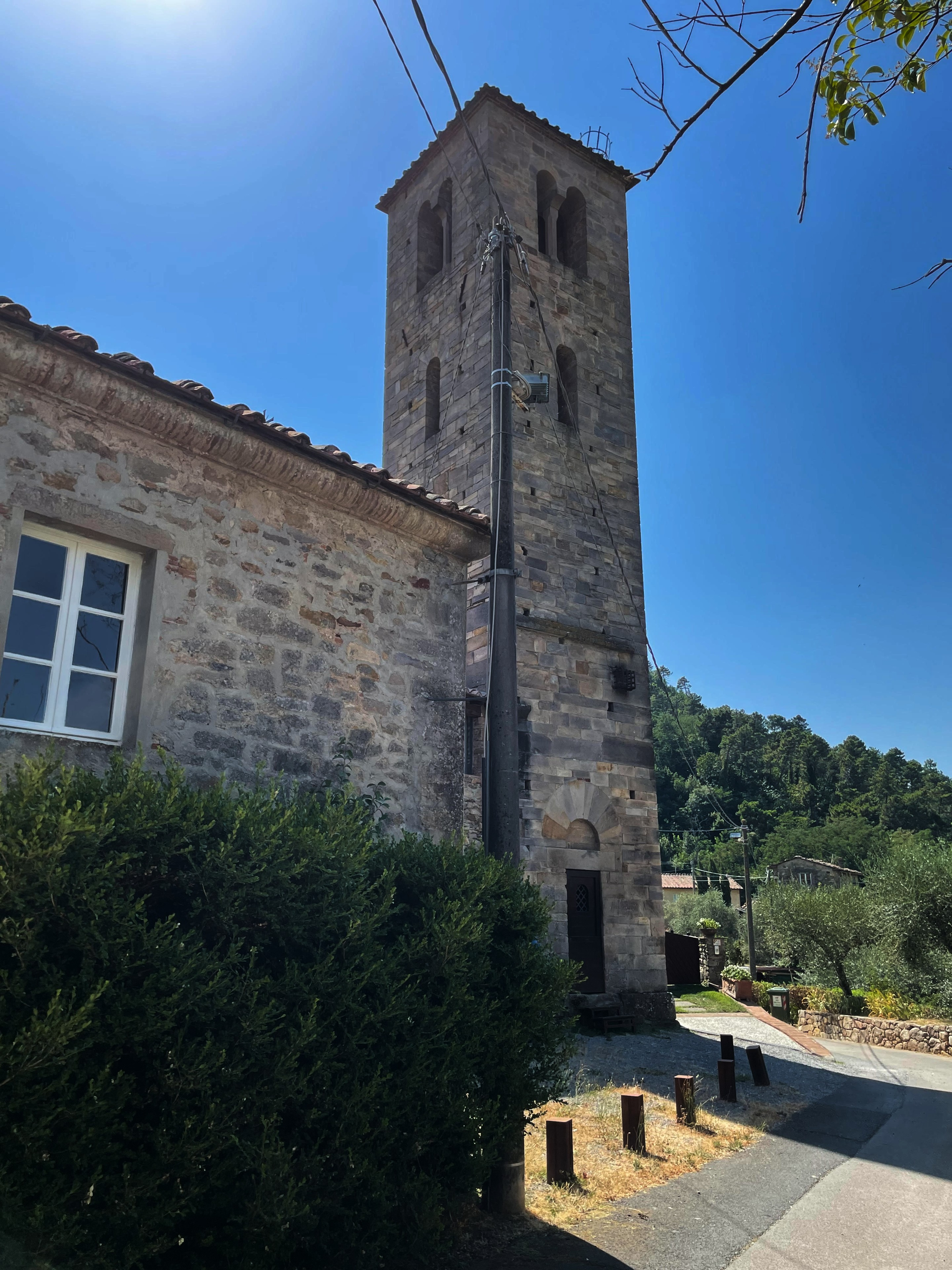
Antica Torre di Segnalazione, Sant'Andrea di Compito, Cappanori, Lucca

The Antica Torre di Segnalazione cannot be dated exactly due to lack of documentation but, by comparison with the similar masonry and architecture with the bell tower of nearby San Giusto di Compito, has been estimated between the 10th and 11th centuries. The tower was built in a panoramic position over the divide between the Compito Valley and the San Giusto di Compito Valley and lies next to a section, which still exists today, of an important trade and medieval pilgrimage route known as Via di San Colombano. In addition to serving as the bell tower for the adjacent ancient Church of San Pietro al Forcone, the tower had to play an important military role for the local area, acting as part of the defensive system that included the castles located on the Castello and Castellaccio hills and the fortified compounds of the churches of Sant'Andrea di Compito and San Giovanni Batista in Pieve di Compito.

The different architectural features found in the upper parts of this monument dating back to the 14th century seem to suggest that the building was damaged during one of the many wars which ravaged the surrounding area. This presumably occurred during the sacking and destruction of military structures in the Compito Valley that took place in 1313 by troops from Pisa under Uguccione della Faggiola. The population decline that occurred throughout the 15th century led to the parish of San Pietro al Forcone being transferred to the parish of Sant'Andrea di Compito. Following the reorganisation and decline of the church, the tower gradually lost its duties as a bell tower, but thanks to its strategic position it maintained an important military role. As part of the shake-up of the defensive system in the Republic of Lucca, the tower was used as a watchtower and incorporated into an extensive communication network that covered the whole of the Republic's territory. There are a few seventeenth-century maps held at the Luca State Archives which confirm this statement, along with several available documents that testify to the existence of a team of guards at the tower. The roof of the building still has a moveable iron basket that used to be filled with flammable material and lit to communicate with the city of Lucca. According to local legend, the heads of executed criminals were put on display as "a warning to the people" in an iron cage fixed above the entrance door: Matraia also describes this macabre custom in his Guida della Diocesi di Luca (Guide to the Diocese of Lucca) from 1859-60. At the end of the 19th century, the tower underwent restoration work, which also repaired the damage caused by the lightning that struck the building on the night of 14 July 1714.

=== Church of Sant'Andrea Apostolo ===
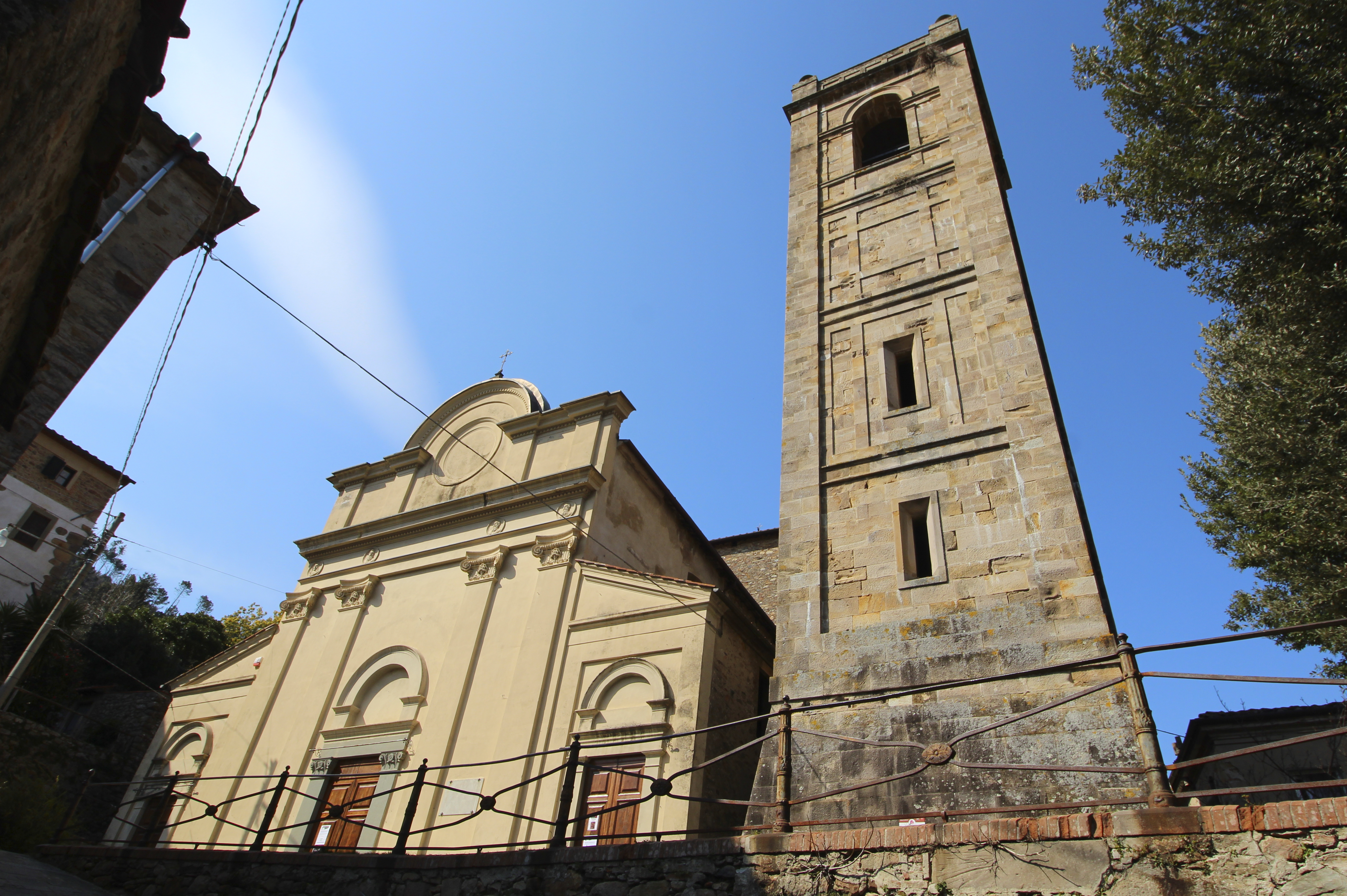
Church of Sant'Andrea Di Compito

On 2 April 919, a primitive chapel dedicated to St Andrew the Apostle was built by the local community for salvation and to worship this saint. A manuscript from the census of 1412 shows the church, the bell tower; the rectory and the cemetery surrounded by a fortified wall, inside of which was a house, a vineyard, as well as several olive and fruit trees. There are no valuable sacred relics or ornaments predating the late 15th century declared on the list of assets belonging to the Church of Sant'Andrea from around 1600. Consequently, it is not too much to think that its defensive system was not good enough to prevent troublesome soldiers from Pisa or Florence from looting the church. However, in 1497, the high altar was decorated with a painting by Domenico di Francesco Corsi, a painter from Lucca, featuring the Madonna with Child between St Andrew and St Luke. As inhabitants' financial situation improved, they were able to help build a new bell tower at the end of the 16th century. It was built onto the eastern side of the church up to a height of 38 ells (about 23 metres), with battlements on the roof. The date of 1577 is engraved onto a stone above the architrave of the entrance door. During the 17th century, many architectural and artistic projects changed the nature of the church, converting it into a building that could accommodate over five hundred people. The high altar features a painting from 1596 by Benedetto Brandimarte, depicting the martyrdom of St Andrew. In 1606, the altars of St Sebastian and Our Lady of the Rosary were built underneath the porticos. Seemingly major works were carried out following the plague of 1630-1632, in memory of which the date of 1634 was carved onto the architrave of the main door. In 1638, the building was embellished with a panelled ceiling, a copy of the one found in the church of San Romano, Lucca, featuring gilded and painted wooden rose windows. Around the end of the 18th century, there were five altars inside the church, each dedicated to a particular saint and featuring a panel with an oil painting of the saint. The only exception was the altar of the Madonna, which featured a statue of the Virgin Mary instead. In 1741, the church was adorned with an organ, a valuable piece from Giovanni Paolo Micheli di Vorno and Giovanni Quilico Coli di San Quirico di Vallerina, who were also behind the construction of the pulpit and the chancel. The Church was also beautifully decorated and embellished with a large amount of sacred ornaments and magnificent silk antependia for each altar. The church's appearance, which we can still admire today, is the result of the work carried out in the 1790s by the Society of the Madonna del Soccorso, which was entirely funded by Giovanni Biagio Orsi. We can still see the commemorative stone placed inside the Church bearing the name of this benefactor. The residents of Sant 'Andrea di Compito were forced to knock down the sixteenth-century bell tower due to the damage caused to the building's structure by the vibrations of the church bells. The construction work on the new 28-metre high bell tower, designed by the architect Pardini, began in 1867 and was finally completed in 1883 following an incredible series of setbacks. The latest major work was carried out at the beginning of the 20th century, when the interior of the building was painted and the church's façade was repaired.

=== San Pietro a Forcone ===
The church of San Pietro a Forcone is the oldest in the village. Also known as the small church of San Lucia, there are reports of the church in several documents dating between 840 and 847, but its origins may go back even further. Nowadays not much remains of the original building and, with only a few lines of carved stonework and two single lancet windows walled-up from the inside remaining, too little remains of the building to identify its construction period. There is a small monastery next to the chapel. The census of 1412 mentions the church with its bell tower, the rectory, the cemetery and the cloister in the middle of a plot of land used for growing vines with a vegetable garden and four olive trees. The building had then been named after St Peter and St Lucy but had seriously deteriorated. Between May 1792 and 15 June 1794, it underwent major restoration work which created the building seen today.

=== Votive Image of Madonna del Soccorso ===
The image was built in the seventeenth century at the beginning of a paved road called the Crociale that leads to the church of Sant' Andrea, on commission of the Society of the Madonna del Soccorso, hence the image was dedicated to Madonna of the same name. The fresco, now deteriorated, was painted in 1705 by a painter from Lucca, Giovanni Domenico Lombardi, on top of an older painting dating from 1661 and was replaced in the 1970s by a statue of Madonna of Lourdes.

=== Compitese Cultural Centre ===
Since it was established by seven young people in 1976, the Compitese Cultural Centre has aimed to protect, enhance and safeguard Compitese's rich artistic, historical and environmental heritage. In 1978 it became a cooperative and volunteers began constructing its sports facilities. Today, the centre organises cultural, sports and charity initiatives ranging an olive oil fair to photography, theatre and music events.

== Notable residents ==
In addition to Mario Pieri, mentioned above, Roman Catholic writer and poet Maria Valtorta took refuge and worked in Sant’Andrea di Compito during 1944.

== Infrastructure and transport ==
=== Cycle ===
For cyclists, one of the most challenging assents of nearby Monte Serra begins at Sant'Andrea di Compito, close to the birthplace of celebrated sprinter Mario Cipollini (San Giusto di Compito). Upgraded with a tarmac surface in the 1990s, the road tunnels through low woodland to an altitude of 812 metres (2,664 ft).

=== Railway ===
From 1928 until 1944, the settlement was served by the Lucca-Pontedera railway through a halt called San Leonardo-Sant'Andrea. However, service ceased following damage sustained during the Second World War and was never restored.

=== Bus ===
Sant'Andrea di Compito is served by local public transport buses run by the CTT Nord company.

== Gallery ==
Churches

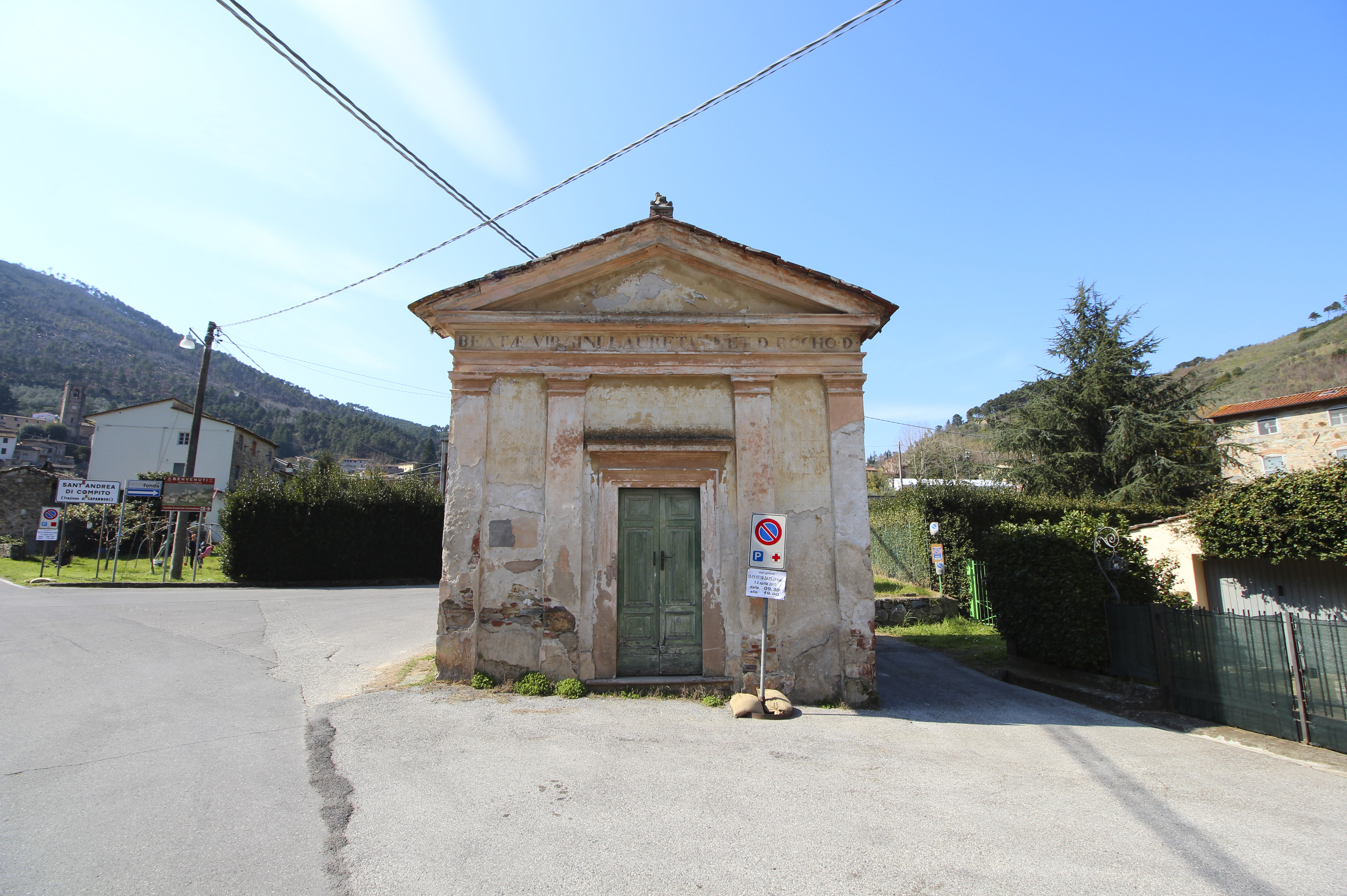
L'oratorio di San Rocco

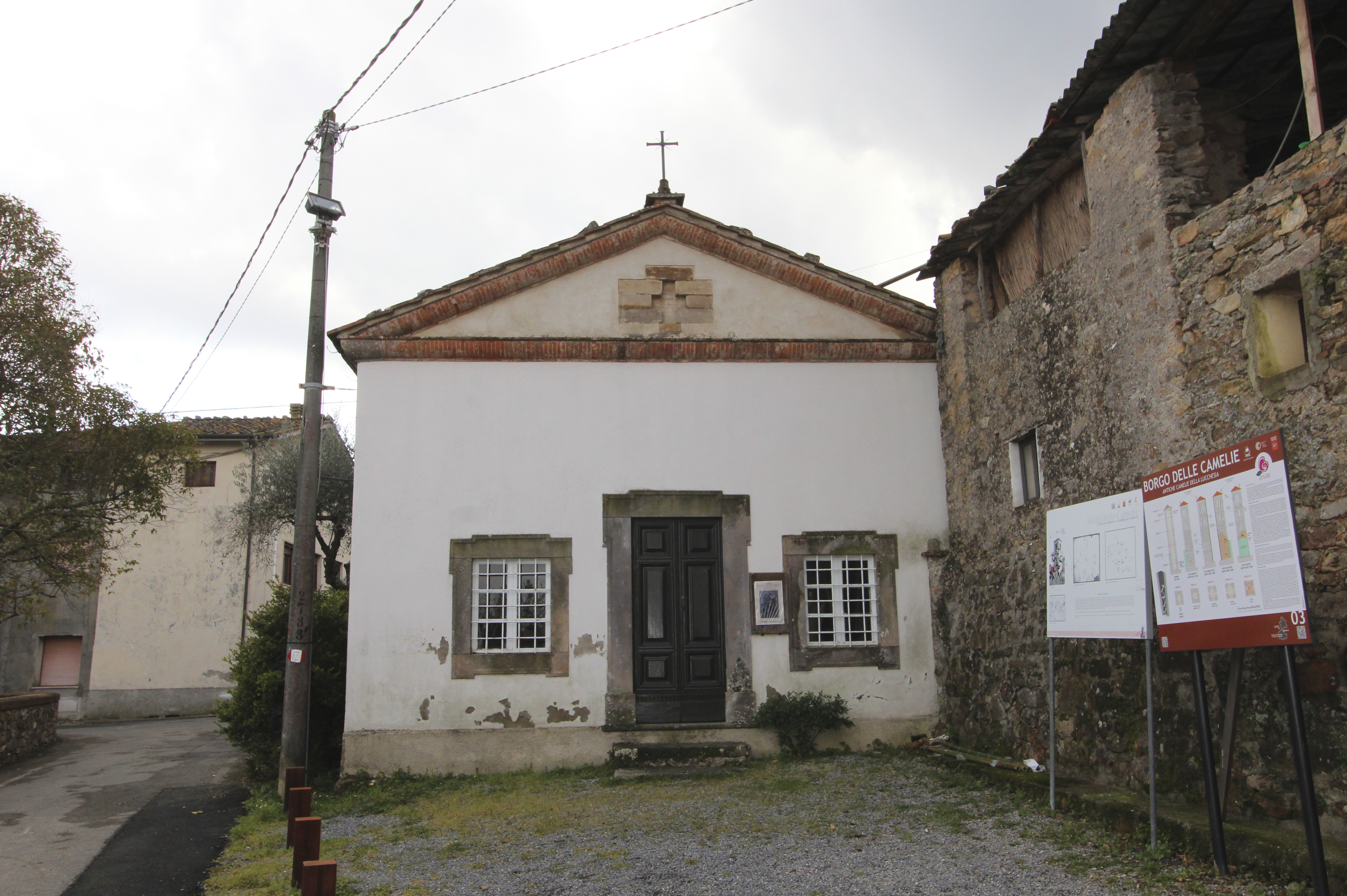
La chiesa di Santa Lucia (già San Pietro in Forcone)
