= Pieve di San Frediano, Lunata =

The Pieve di San Frediano is a rural parish church, originally founded in the 8th century, and located in Lunata, a hamlet of the town of Capannori, province of Lucca, region of Tuscany, Italy.

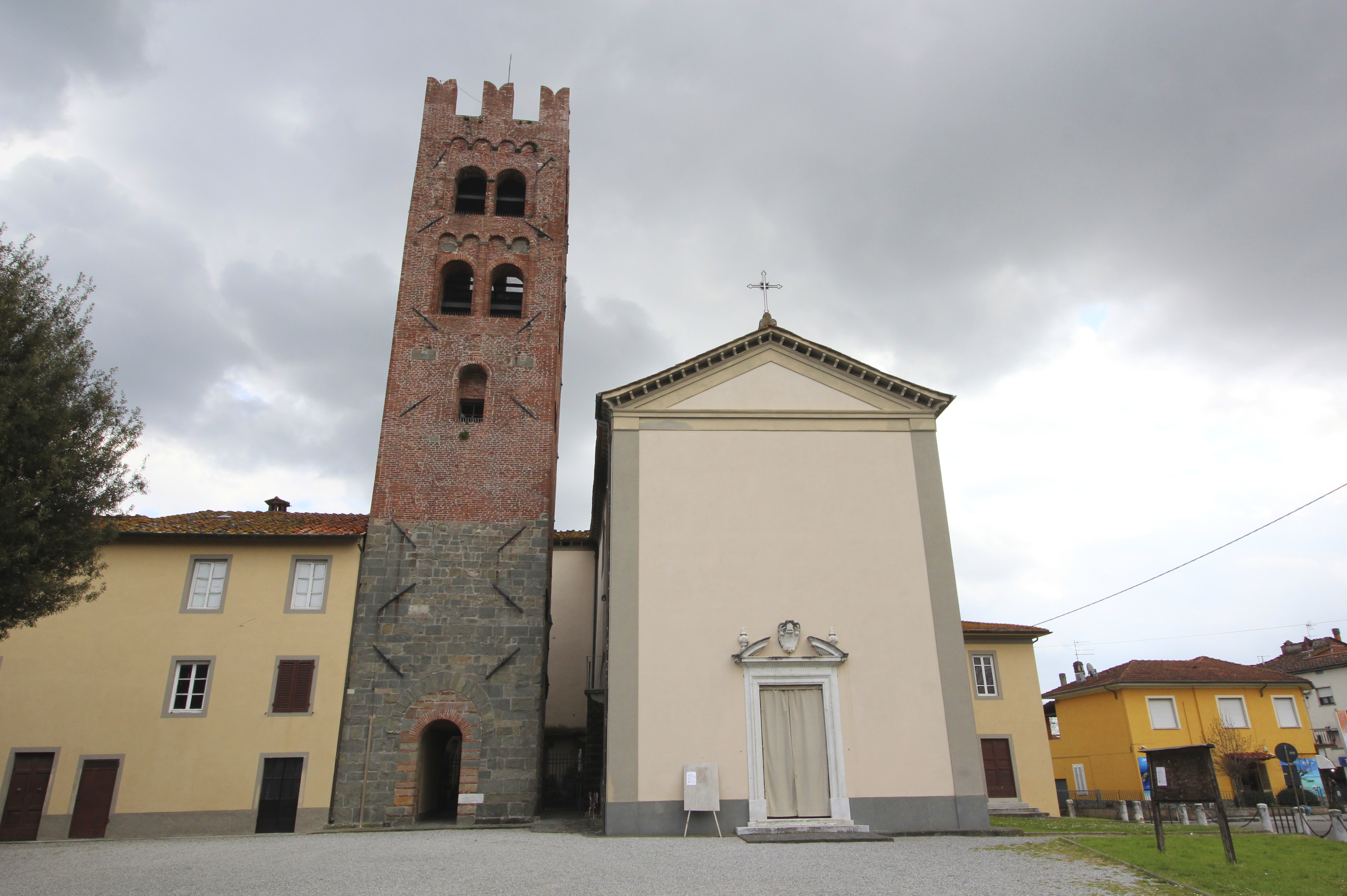
The Pieve di San Frediano

== History and description ==
Documents from 768, note a church dedicated to St Martin at this locale, but by 812, they mention a church dedicated to San Frediano. In these early centuries, it was prominent, being the mother church to Sant'Andrea di Tempagnano, San Lorenzo di Picciorana, San Michele di Antraccoli and San Quirico di Capannori. The church was originally on the pilgrimage route to Rome, Via Francigena, and the town of Lunata had a pilgrims hostel.

Little remains of the original structure. The bell-tower was built in the 12th and 13th centuries with pietra serena at the base, and brick superiorly. The windows have mullions and the top has ghibelline merlons. The church was built in the 18th century, but refurbished in the 19th century.

The interior has a baptismal font (1481) and a holy water stoup by followers of Matteo Civitali. To the right of the main altar are two canvases (1604-2604): Mystical Marriage of St Catherine and God in Glory by Francesco Vanni. The altar in the right transept contains a venerated icon of an Enthroned Madonna and Child, known as the Madonna del Metrito. THe left transept has an altarpiece depicting St John the Baptist and St Jerome (1566) by Alessandro Ardenti. The apse has an early 1900s frescoes by Michele Marcucci.
