= Mario Pieri =

Italian mathematician (1860–1913)

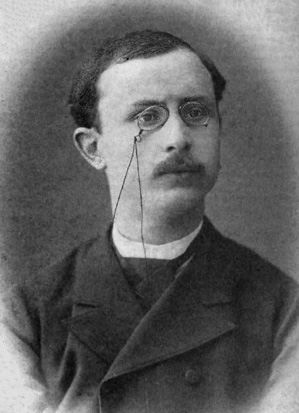
- Born: 22 June 1860; Lucca, Italy
- Died: 1 March 1913 (aged 52); Sant'Andrea di Compito, Tuscany, Italy
- Scientific career
- Fields: Mathematics

Mario Pieri (22 June 1860 – 1 March 1913) was an Italian mathematician who is known for his work on foundations of geometry.

== Biography ==
Pieri was born in Lucca, Italy, the son of Pellegrino Pieri and Ermina Luporini. Pellegrino was a lawyer. Pieri began his higher education at University of Bologna where he drew the attention of Salvatore Pincherle. Obtaining a scholarship, Pieri transferred to Scuola Normale Superiore in Pisa. There he took his degree in 1884 and worked first at a technical secondary school in Pisa.

When an opportunity arose at the military academy in Turin to teach projective geometry, Pieri moved there and, by 1888, he was also an assistant instructor in the same subject at the University of Turin. By 1891, he had become libero docente at the university, teaching elective courses. Pieri continued to teach in Turin until 1900 when, through competition, he was awarded the position of extraordinary professor at University of Catania on the island of Sicily.

Von Staudt's Geometrie der Lage (1847) was a much admired text on projective geometry. In 1889 Pieri translated it as Geometria di Posizione, a publication that included a study of the life and work of von Staudt written by Corrado Segre, the initiator of the project.

Pieri also came under the influence of Giuseppe Peano at Turin. He contributed to the Formulario mathematico, and Peano placed nine of Pieri's papers for publication with the Academy of Sciences of Turin between 1895 and 1912. They shared a passion for reducing geometric ideas to their logical form and expressing these ideas symbolically.

In 1898 Pieri wrote I principii della geometria di posizione composti in un sistema logico-deduttivo. It progressively introduced independent axioms:

based on nineteen sequentially independent axioms – each independent of the preceding ones – which are introduced one by one as they are needed in the development, thus allowing the reader to determine on which axioms a given theorem depends.

Pieri was invited to address the International Congress of Philosophy in 1900 in Paris. Since this was also the year he moved from Turin to Sicily, he declined to attend but sent a paper "Sur la Géométrie envisagée comme un système purement logique", which was delivered by Louis Couturat. The ideas were also advanced by Alessandro Padoa at both that congress and the International Congress of Mathematicians also held in Paris that year.

In 1900 Pieri wrote Monographia del punto e del moto, which Smith calls the Point and Motion memoire. It is noteworthy as using only two primitive notions, point and motion to develop axioms for geometry. Alessandro Padoa shared in this expression of Peano's logico-geometrical program that reduced the number of primitive notions from the four used by Moritz Pasch.

The research into the foundations of geometry led to another formulation in 1908 in a Point and Sphere memoire. Smith (2010) describes it as

a full axiomatization of Euclidean geometry based solely on the primitive concepts point and equidistance of two points N and P from a third point O, written ON = OP.

This memoire was translated into Polish in 1915 by S. Kwietniewski. A young Alfred Tarski encountered the text and carried forward Pieri's program.

In 1908 Pieri moved to University of Parma, and in 1911 fell ill. Pieri died in Sant'Andrea di Compito, not far from Lucca.

In 2002 Avellone, Brigaglia & Zappulla gave a modern evaluation of Pieri's contribution to geometry:

Pieri's work was very influential. B. Russell and L. Couturat rightly regarded him as the founder of mathematics as a hypothetical-deductive science. His precision, his rigour, and his analytical clarity are unrivaled by other Italian geometers, perhaps with the exception of Peano.

Giuseppe Peano wrote this tribute to Pieri upon his death:

Pieri was totally dedicated to science and teaching. He was an untiring worker, honest, and of a singular modesty. When, some twenty years ago, the professors in Italy agitated for higher salaries, Pieri declared that their salaries were already above the work they did and their merit.

Mario Pieri's collected works were published by the Italian Mathematical Union in 1980 under the title Opere sui fondamenti della matematica (Edizioni Cremonese, Bologna).

== Personal life ==
For several years before his death, Pieri resided in Sant'Andrea di Compito as a guest of his sister Gemma Pieri Campetti and her husband, Umberto, a lawyer. Pieri was initially buried in a local church before his remains were transferred to the monumental cemetery in Lucca.

== See also ==
- Pieri's formula
