= San Leonardo in Treponzio =

Church in San Leonardo, Italy

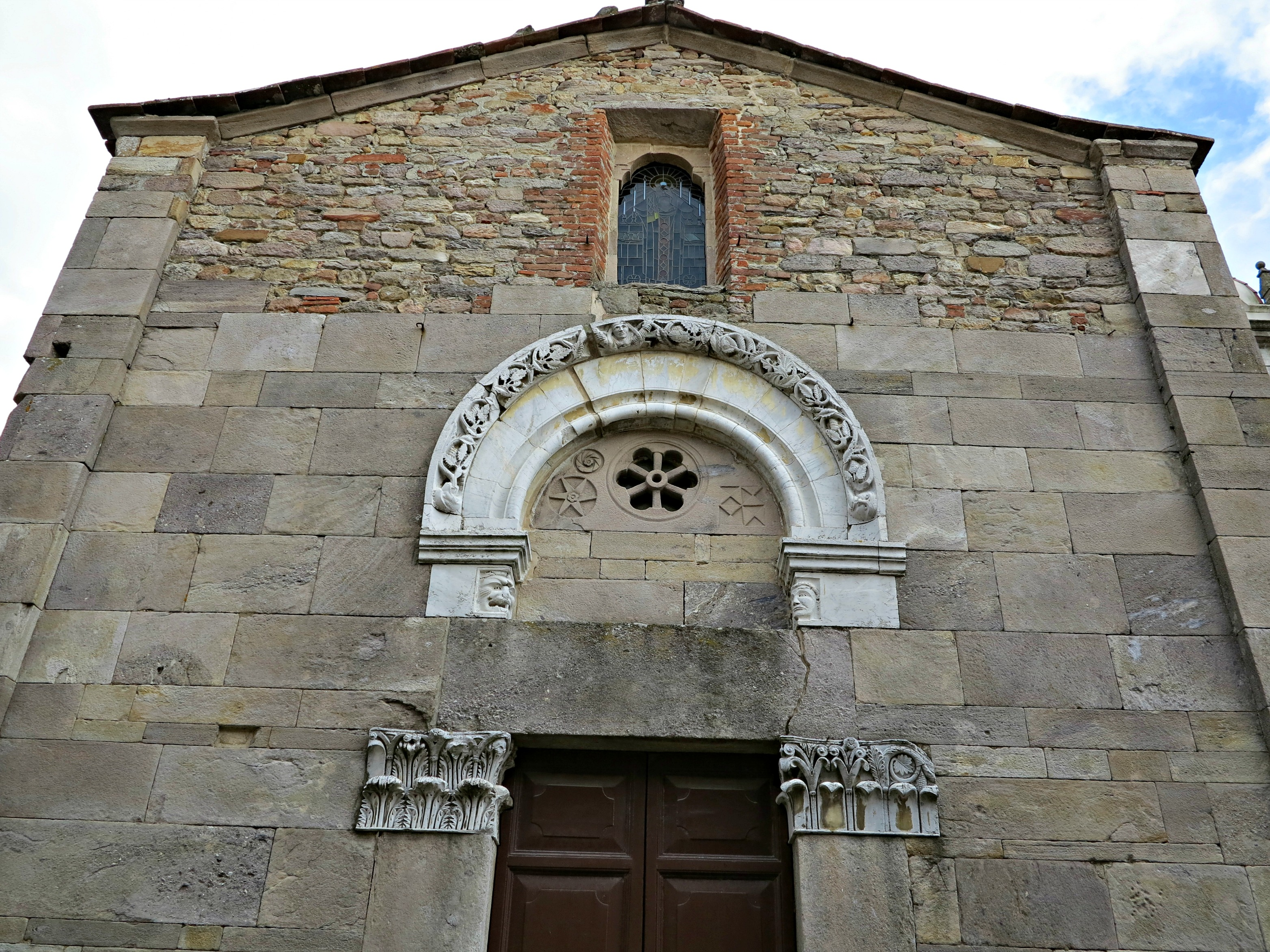
Western facade

The San Leonardo in Treponzio is a Romanesque-style, Roman Catholic parish church, located along the road from neighborhood of Compito to the center of the town of Capannori in the province of Lucca, Tuscany, Italy.

== History ==
The church was located alongside an Ancient Roman road. In 1105, a church and hospital were founded to attend pilgrims in route south. The layout is that of a Latin cross with a single nave and hemi-circular apse. The original bell-tower was razed, and replaced at the same site by a new tower in 1894. The facade has sculptural decoration attributed to followers of Guidetto.

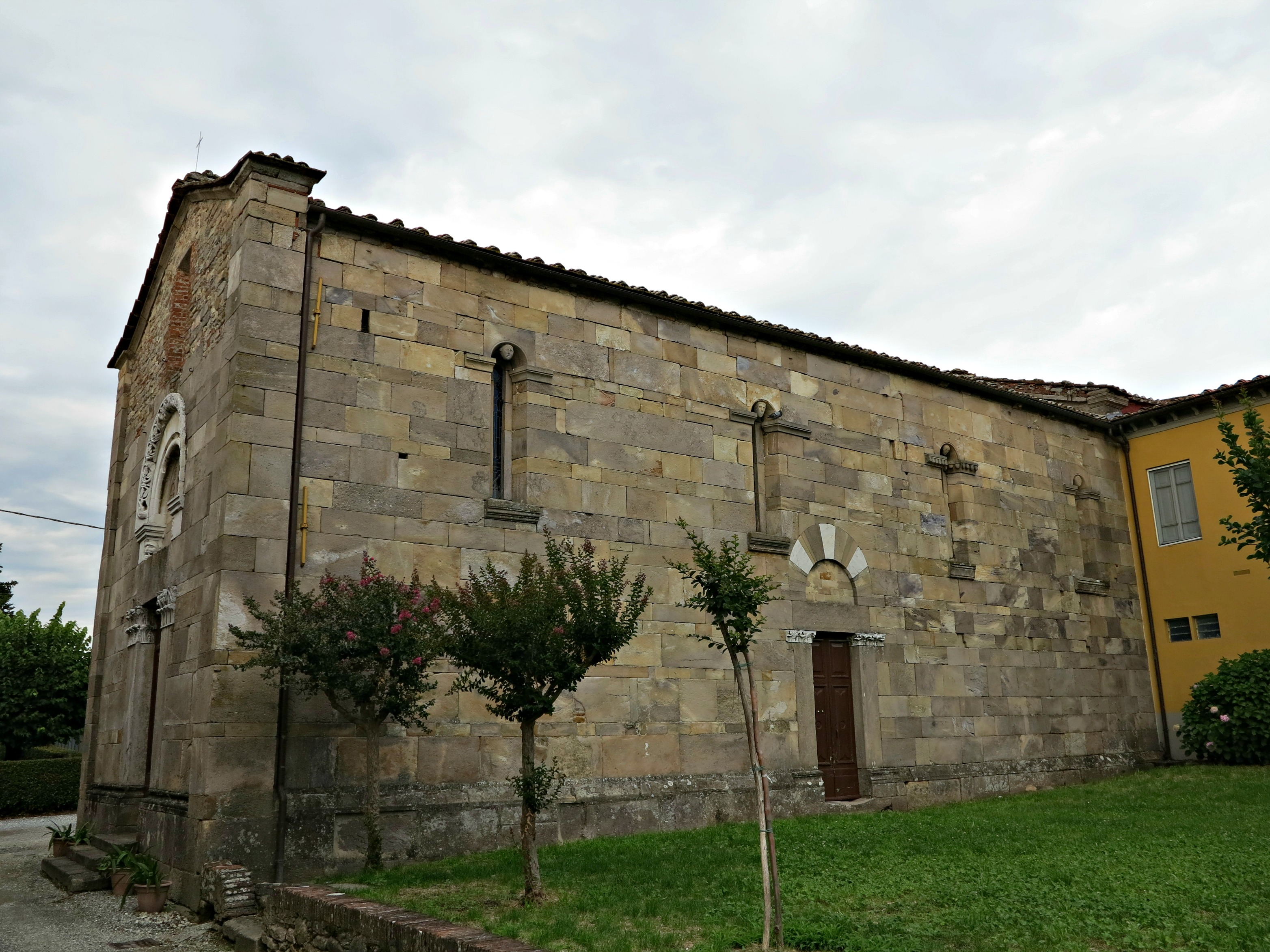
Southern facade.
