= San Giusto di Compito =

- Frazione
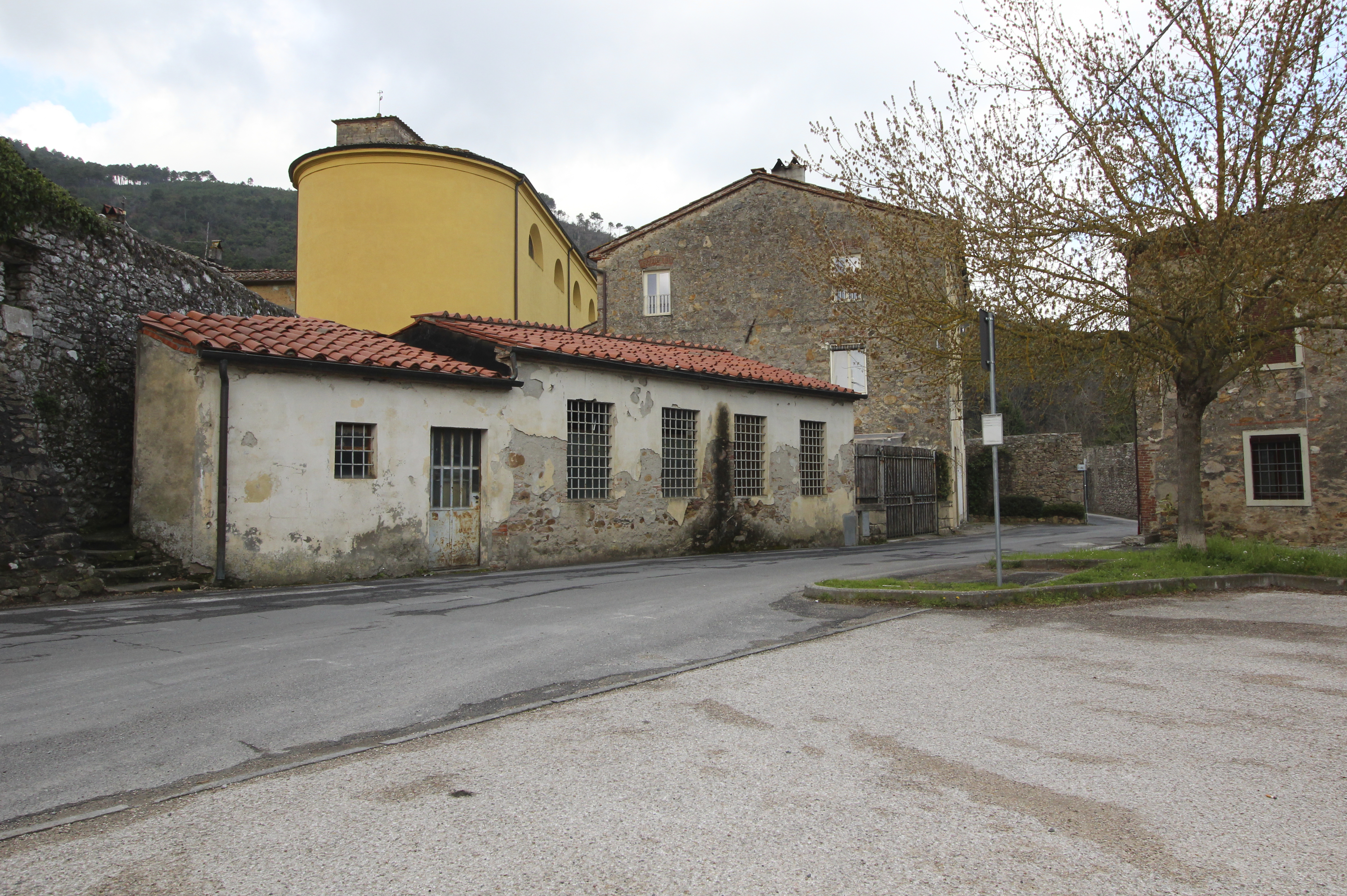
- Panorama of San Giusto di Compito

- Location of San Giusto di Compito in Italy
- Coordinates: 43°47′40″N 10°32′59″E
- Country: Italy
- Region: Tuscany
- Province: Lucca (LU)
- Comune: Capannori
- Time zone: UTC+1 (CET)
  - Summer (DST): UTC+2 (CEST)
- Postal code: 55062
- Dialing code: (+39) 0583

San Giusto di Compito (also San Giusto di Cómpito) is a frazione of Capannori in the province of Lucca region of Tuscany in Italy.

== Geography ==
San Giusto di Compito lies approximately 5 km south of the town of Capannori, 10 km south-east of the provincial capital Lucca and 55 km west of the regional capital Florence. The hamlet lies on a foothill north of the Monte Pisanino not far from the southeastern lake Lago di Bientina (Lago di Sesto, municipality of Bientina) and the plain of Piana Lucchese. Sant'Andrea di Compito is situated northwest of Castelvecchio di Compito, and northwest of Colle di Compito, its neighbouring settlements and administrative frazioni.
