= Benedetto Brandimarte =

Italian painter

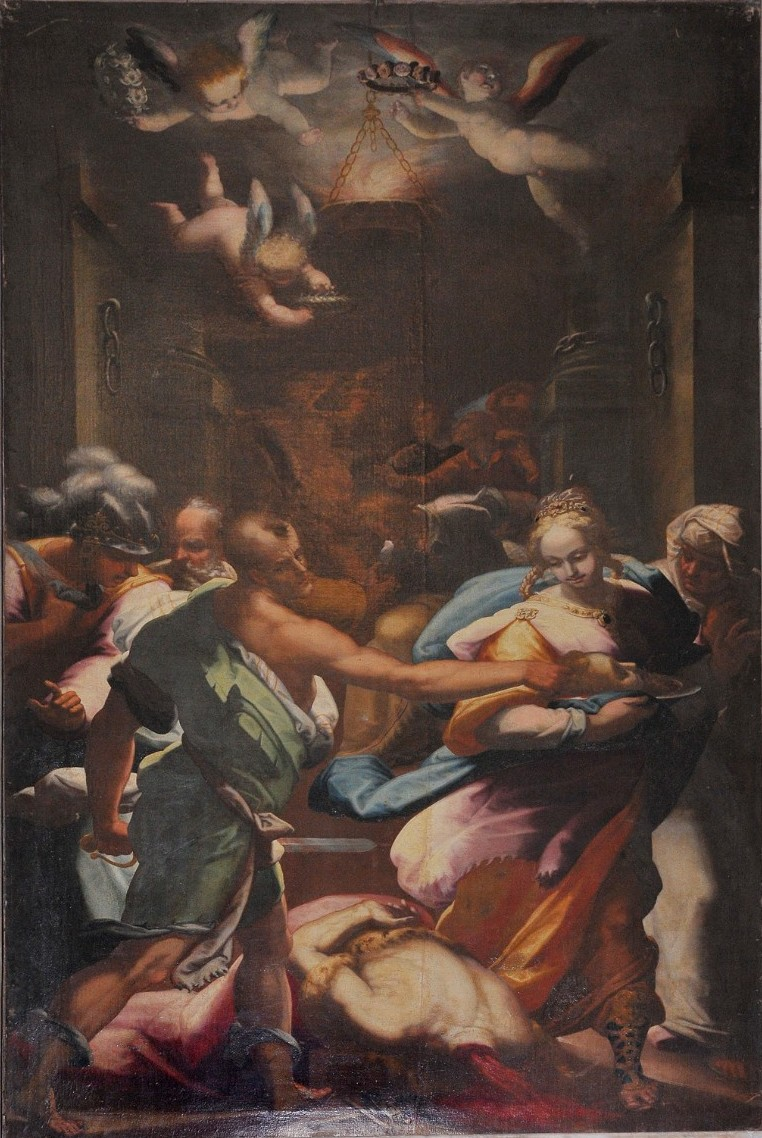
The beheading of St. John the Baptist

Benedetto Brandimarte or Brandimarti (late-16th century) was an Italian painter. He is a representative of the Mannerist style, which is reflected in the extreme artificiality shown in the unnatural movement of the figures and the brilliance of the colors of his works.

== Life ==
Very little is known about the artist. He was likely born in Lucca the second half of the sixteenth century. Hired in 1581 by Prince Giovanni Andrea Doria, he began to receive a salary for his activity in Genoa from the next year. The Prince sent him to Spain and on his return commissioned various works from him for the churches supported by the Prince: in 1590 he painted a Nativity and an Assumption for the Church of Sant'Agostino in Loano and a little later the doors of the organ (now dismembered) in the Church of Saint Benedict of Fassolo.

It is recorded that in 1592 he was commissioned by Prince Giovanni Battista II Doria, to realize some works in the Church of San Benedetto al Porto in Genoa, including The beheading of St. John the Baptist.

== Works ==
The Mannerist paintings of Brandimarte may have appeared quite unusual to the Genoese public, with their tense and contorted poses of the figures and iridescent colors, bordering on the luminescent.

His works are in situ in several churches in Liguria including in the Church of San Pietro in Banchi in Genoa, the oratory of Santissima Annunziata in Pietra Ligure and the Church of Sant'Agostino in Loano. In Tuscany, there is work by him in the Collegiate Church of Santa Maria Assunta in Camaiore.

The Villa Altogradi in Capannori, in the province of Lucca, holds his Martyrdom of St. Stephen.
