= Lunata =

Coordinates: 43°51′20″N 10°33′54″E

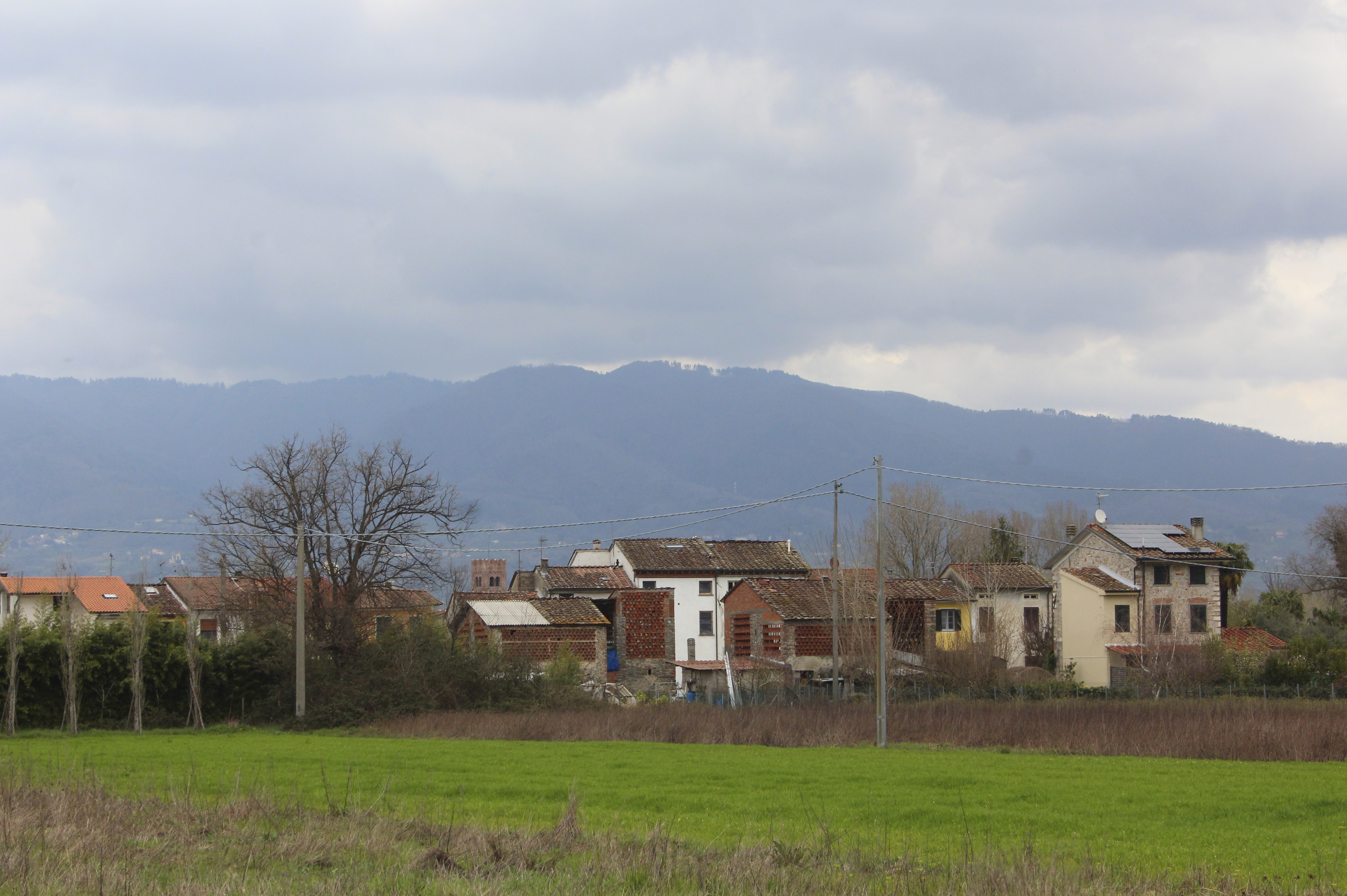
Panorama of Lunata

Lunata is a locality of the commune of Capannori in the Province of Lucca, Tuscany, central Italy, one of the forty frazioni identified in the municipal statute. It is some 7 km from the city of Lucca.
