= Santi Quirico e Giulitta, Capannori =

Roman Catholic parish church in Tuscany, Italy

Coordinates: 43.841830°N 10.574359°E

Santi Quirico e Giulitta is 12th-century Roman Catholic parish church in Capannori, province of Lucca, region of Tuscany, Italy.

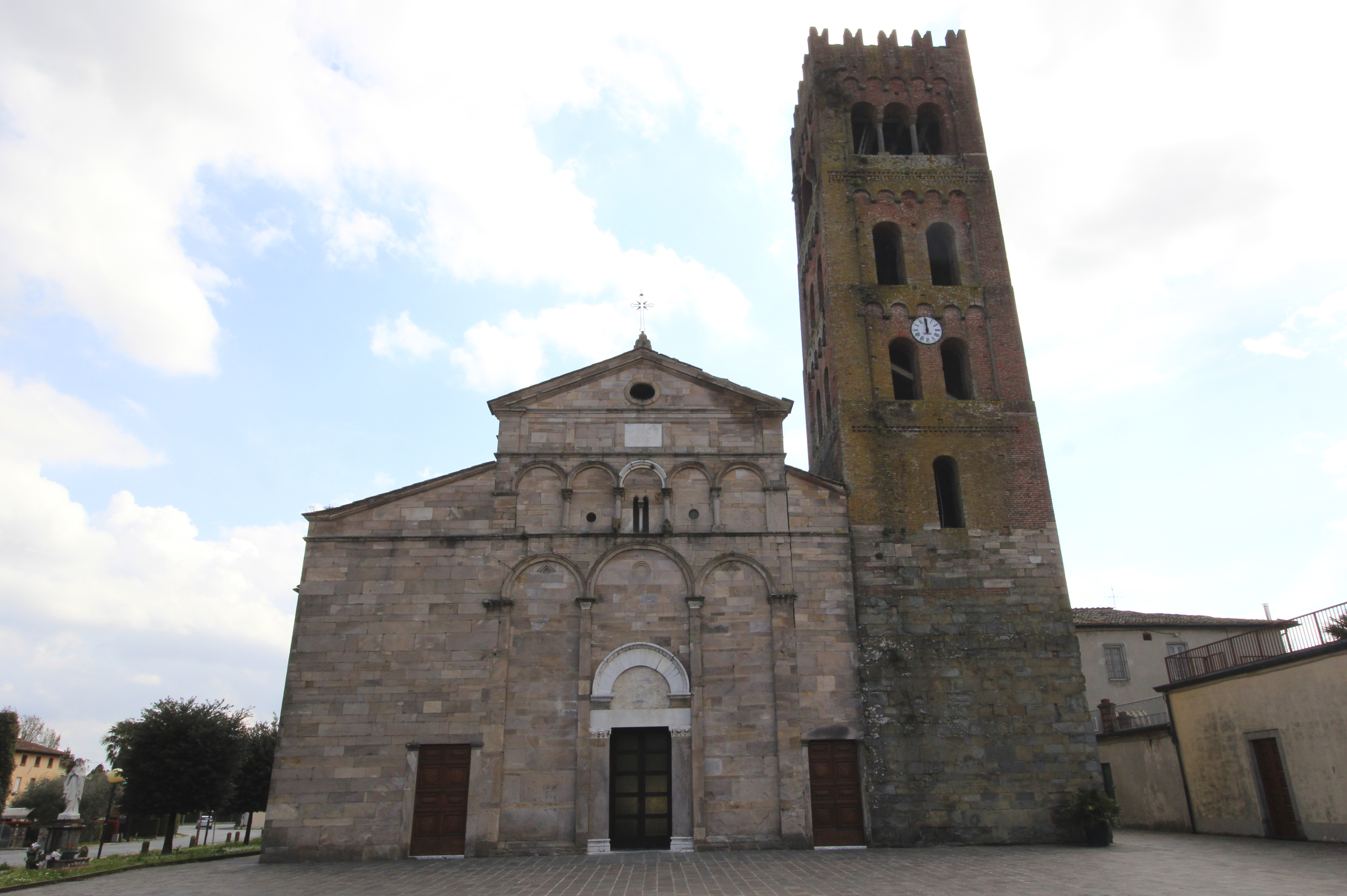
Santi Quirico e Giulitta, Capannori

== History ==
The church was originally called San Quirico a Quarto alla Rotta and is mentioned in documents as early as 786. It was razed in the 10th-century, and entirely rebuilt in 970. Again rebuilt in the 12th-century in the style now evident. The church appears to have used spolia from the prior constructions. A document from 1260 cites the church was subsidiary to the parish church of San Frediano di Lunata.

The church has a single nave, with a facade notable for blind arches. In the 14th-century, the building was damaged by a fire. Further refurbishments occurred mainly in the interior, including refashioning the apse. The bell-tower was reconstructed in the 19th-century with merlions added to the roof-line. The interior of the apse was frescoed in 1897 by Michele Marcucci, he also painted the Sacred Heart in the right transept and the Souls of Purgatory in the second altar on the right. The Polyptych of Santi Quirico e Giulitta (1448) painted by Borghese di Pietro Borghese was dispersed; some of the panels are on display in the Courtauld Institute.
