= Colle di Compito =

- Frazione
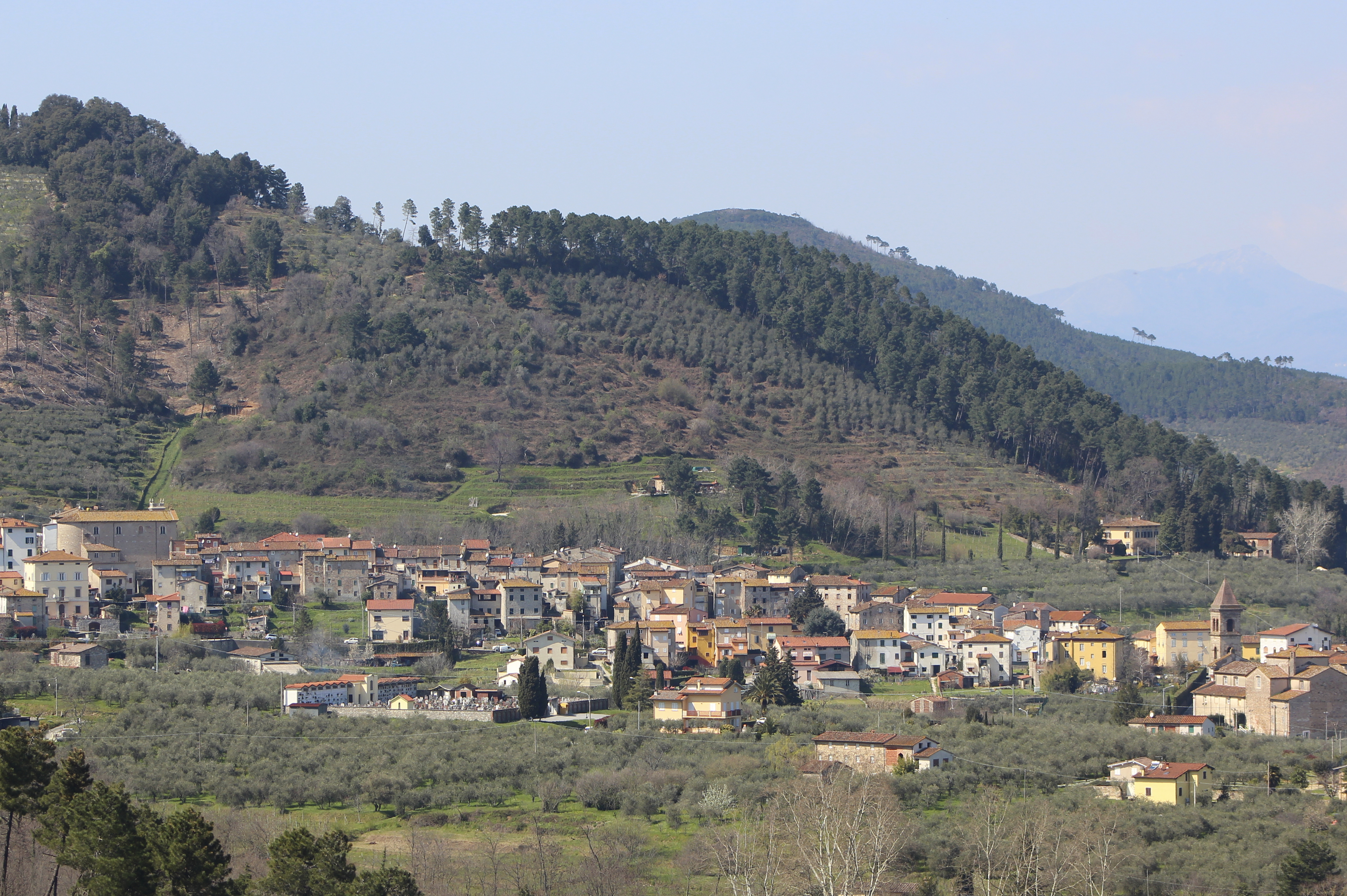
- Panorama of Colle di Compito

- Location of Colle di Compito in Italy
- Coordinates: 43°46′09″N 10°35′40″E
- Country: Italy
- Region: Tuscany
- Province: Lucca (LU)
- Comune: Capannori
- Elevation: 36 m (118 ft)
- Time zone: UTC+1 (CET)
  - Summer (DST): UTC+2 (CEST)
- Postal code: 55062
- Dialing code: (+39) 0583

Colle di Compito (also Colle di Cómpito) is a frazione of Capannori in the province of Lucca region of Tuscany in Italy.

== Geography ==
Colle di Compito lies approximately 7 km south of the town of Capannori, 10 km south-east of the provincial capital Lucca and 55 km west of the regional capital Florence. The hamlet lies on a foothill north of the Monte Pisanino not far from the southeastern lake Lago di Bientina (Lago di Sesto, municipality of Bientina) and the plain of Piana Lucchese. Colle di Compito is situated northwest of Castelvecchio di Compito, and southeast of Pieve di Compito, its neighbouring settlements and administrative frazioni.

== History ==
The place first arose from several smaller settlements (Borghi) before the Castrum Novum Castle was built in the Locality of Lecci above today's town center, which is called Borghetto. Another fortified complex was built from the Borghetto, parts of which are still in place, along with a city gate. At that time the town belonged as a fief to the Lambercioni family from Vorno (today also a hamlet of Capannori), close to the Republic of Pisa. In a conflict between Lucca and Pisa, the town was occupied and destroyed by Lucca in 1148. After the reconstruction by the Lambercioni, the hamlet remained in the sphere of influence of Lucca until, in 1313, it was ransacked by Uguccione della Faggiola, who was in the pay of Pisa. Colle di Compito was last damaged in 1544 by Pisan and Florentine troops. After that, the place remained in the sphere of influence of Lucca.

In 1942, during World War II, a prisoner-of-war camp was established in the village. Its official number was P.G. (prigionieri di guerra) 60, and it was usually referred to as PG 60 Lucca. Although it never had permanent structures and accommodation consisted of tents in an area prone to flooding, it housed more than 3,000 British and Commonwealth prisoners of war during the period of its existence. It was handed over to the Germans on 10 September 1943, not long after the signing of the Italian armistice. During the Italian Social Republic, as a puppet state of the Germans, political prisoners, foreigners, common law prisoners and Jews were interned there, and it functioned as a concentration camp. In June 1944 the prisoners were moved to Bagni di Lucca.

== Sights ==
- Santa Maria Assunta, the parish church below the village, which was first mentioned in the 11th century. It was documented in 1245.
- Santa Maria della Consolazione (also Santuario della Madonna della Consolazione), a church in the town center. The church was built between 1657 and 1666 and was enlarged in 1790. The neoclassical façade dates from the 19th century and the campanile was built in 1908.
- San Martino a Palaiola, 1260 a church lying between Colle di Compito and Pieve di Compito.
Churches

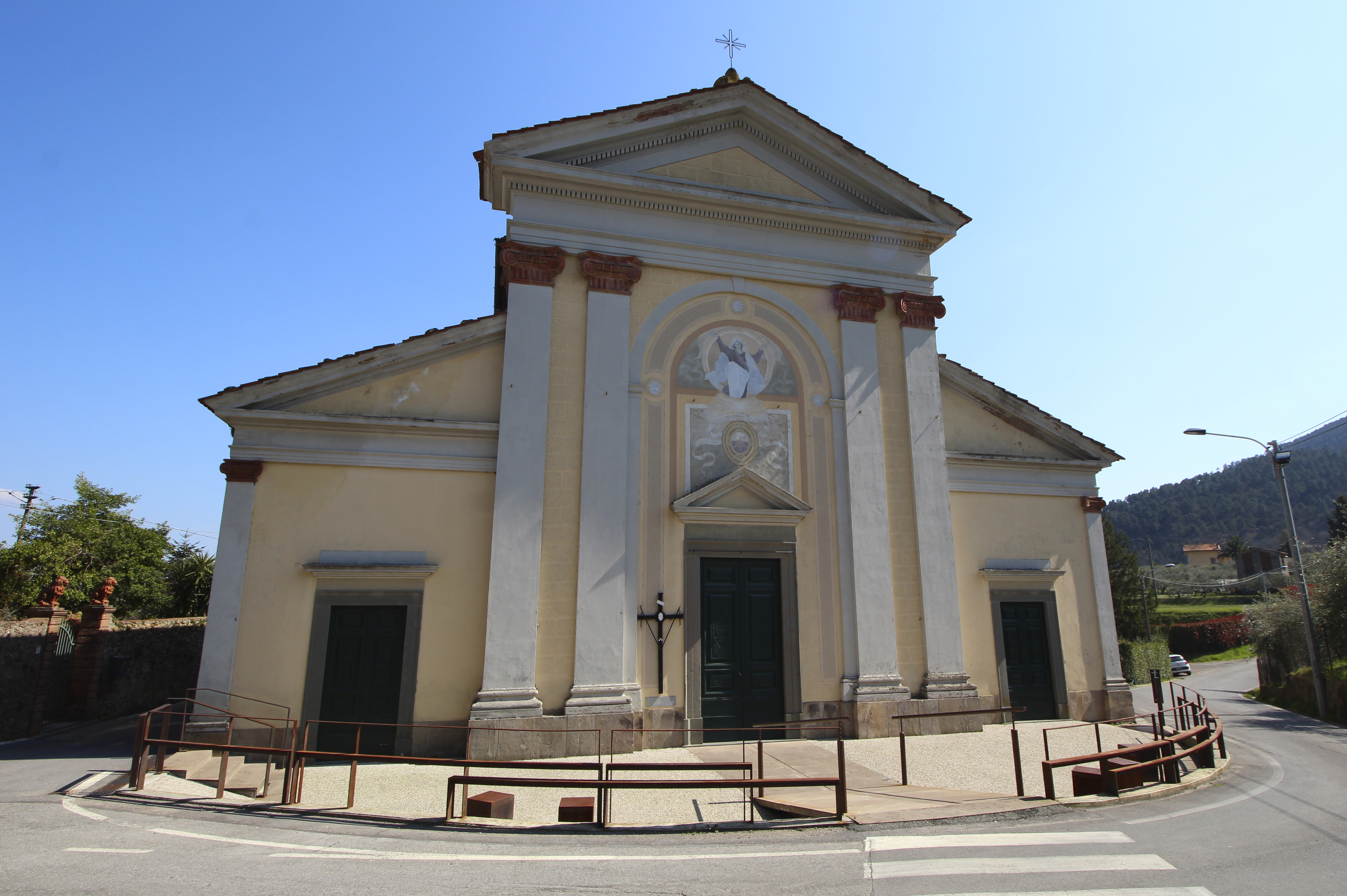
Church of Santa Maria Assunta

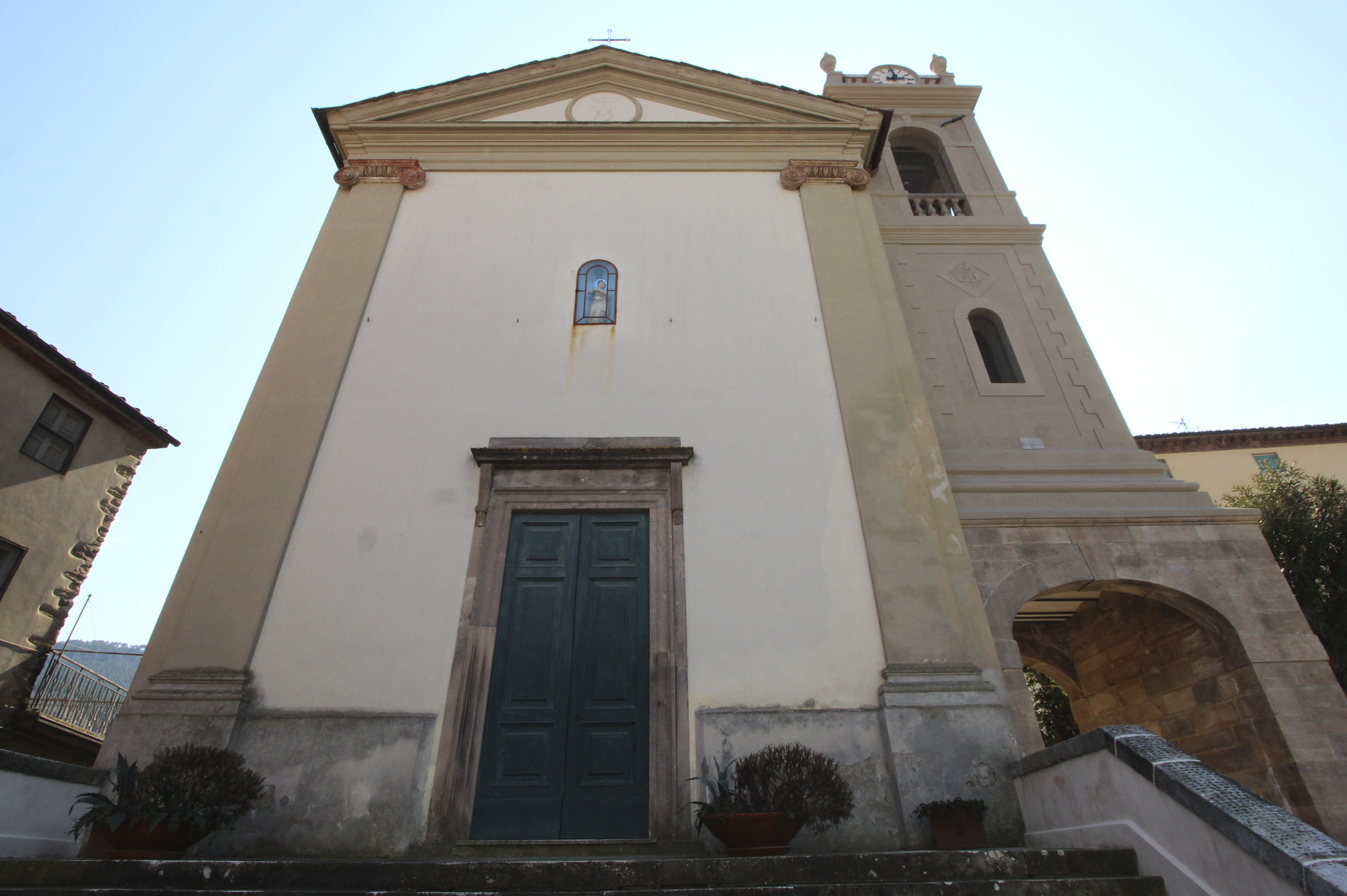
Church of Santa Maria della Consolazione

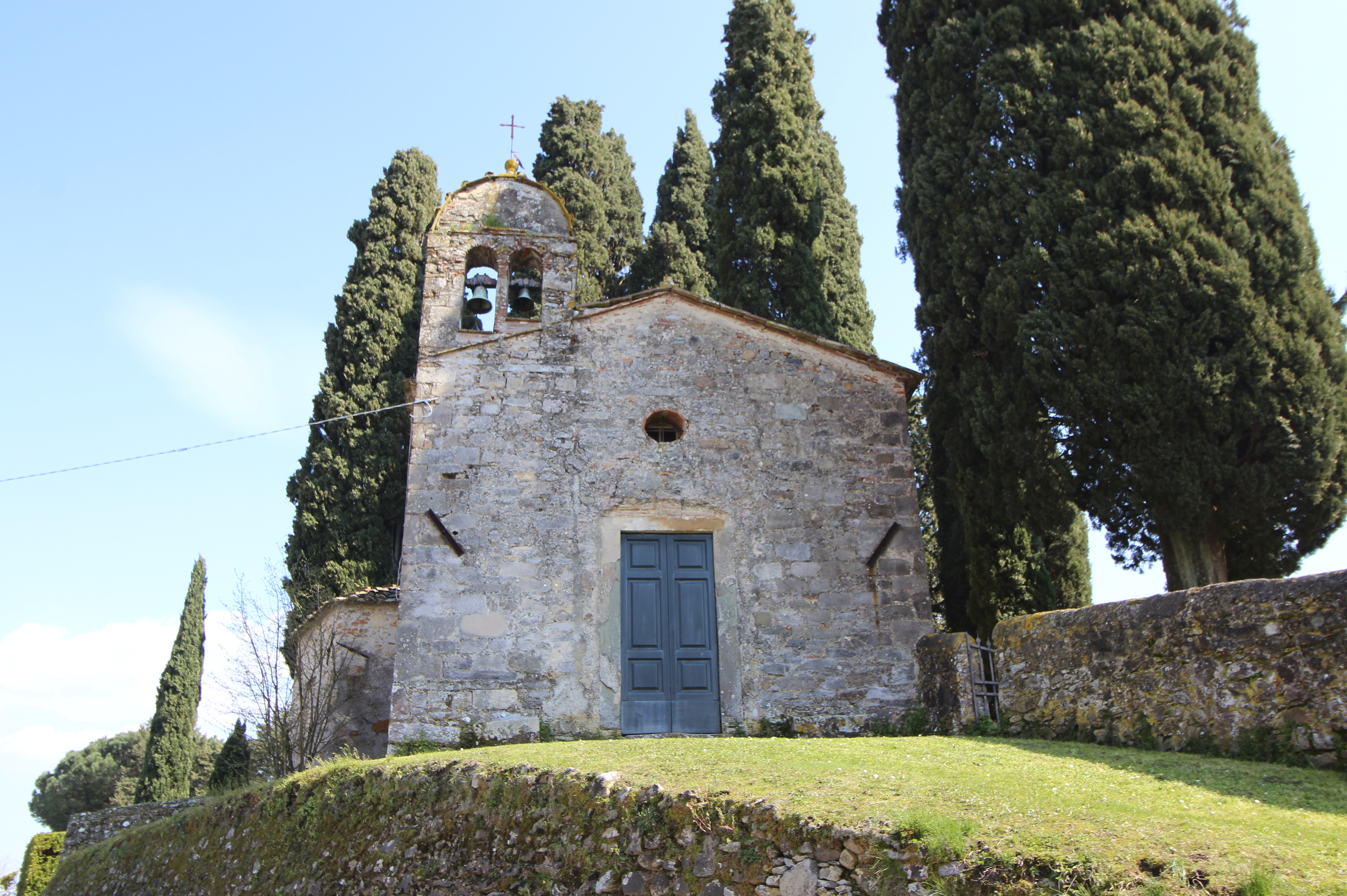
Church of San Martino a Palaiola

== Literature ==
- Emanuele Repetti: Colle di Compito. In: Dizionario Geografico Fisico Storico della Toscana (1833–1846). Online Edition from University of Siena (PDF, Italian Language)
