= Capannori =

- Comune
- Comune di Capannori
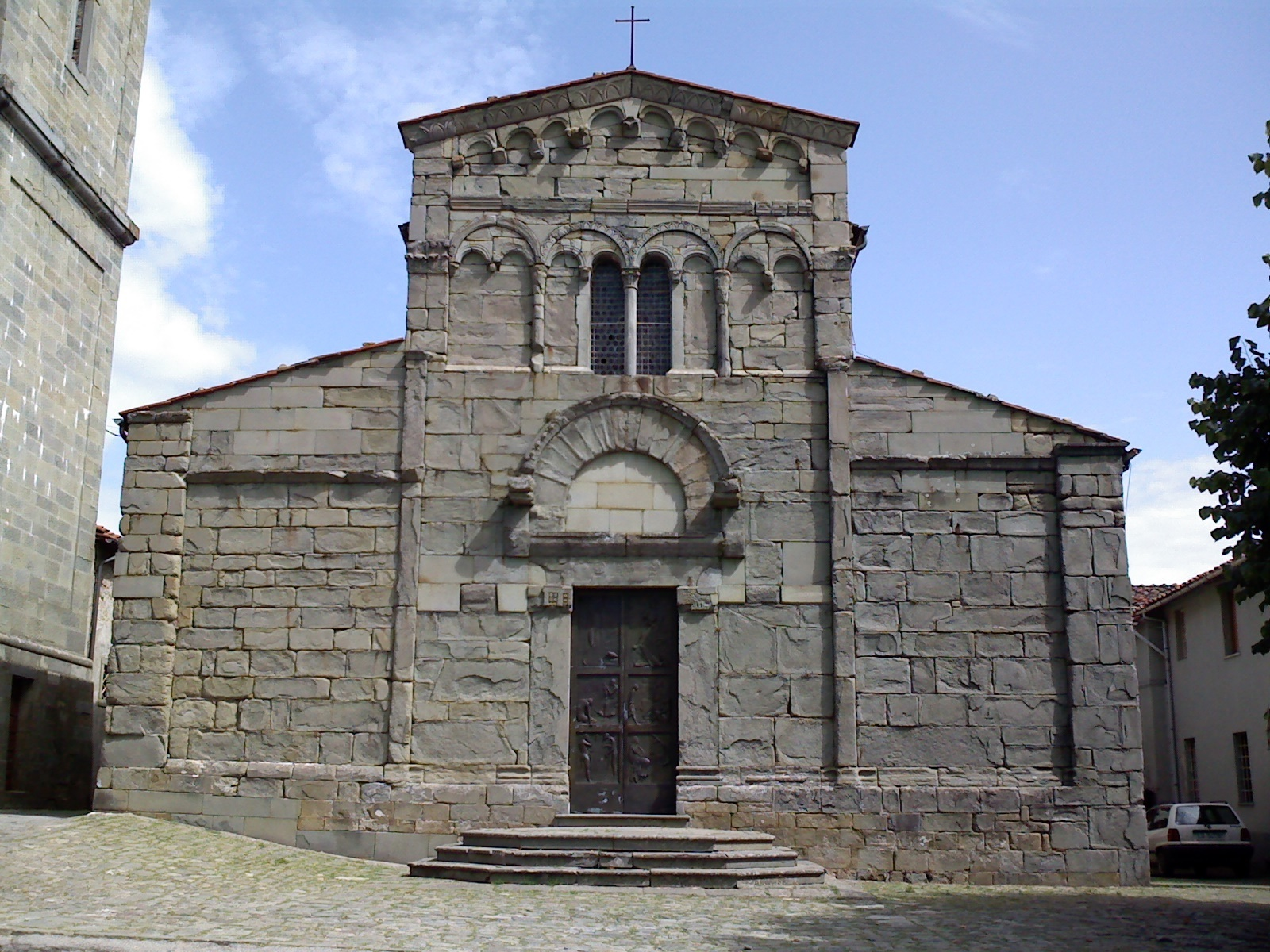
- Pieve of San Gennaro.

- Coat of arms

- Capannori within the Province of Lucca

- Location within Italy Location within Tuscany
- Coordinates: 43°51′N 10°34′E
- Country: Italy
- Region: Tuscany
- Province: Lucca (LU)
- Frazioni: see list

Government
  - Mayor: Giordano Del Chiaro

Area
  - Total: 155.96 km^{2} (60.22 sq mi)
- Elevation: 15 m (49 ft)

Population (31 March 2017)
  - Total: 46,177
  - Density: 296.08/km^{2} (766.85/sq mi)
- Demonym: Capannoresi
- Time zone: UTC+1 (CET)
  - Summer (DST): UTC+2 (CEST)
- Postal code: 55012
- Dialing code: 0583
- Website: Official website

Capannori (Italian pronunciation: [kaˈpannori]) is an Italian town and comune in the province of Lucca, in northern Tuscany.

== History ==
The 40 hamlets of Capannori are located on the lands that once corresponded to the eastern territories of the Republic of Lucca. Most of those hamlets date back to medieval times.

Colognora di Compito was featured in the 2008 film Miracle at St. Anna.

== Geography ==
=== Overview ===
Located in south of its province, next to the provinces of Pisa and Pistoia, the municipality borders with Altopascio, Bientina, Borgo a Mozzano, Buti, Calci, Lucca, Montecarlo, Pescia, Porcari, San Giuliano Terme, and Villa Basilica.

=== Frazioni ===
Map of the municipal districts

Capannori counts 40 hamlets (frazioni).

The most populated village is not the town of Capannori, but the hamlet of Marlia (5,000 inhabitants).

The hamlets of Capannori are: Badia di Cantignano, Camigliano, Carraia, Castelvecchio di Compito, Colle di Compito (the site of prisoner-of-war camp PG 60 during World War II), Colognora di Compito, Coselli, Gragnano, Guamo, Lammari, Lappato, Lunata, Marlia, Massa Macinaia, Matraia, Paganico, Parezzana, Petrognano, Pieve di Compito, Pieve San Paolo, Ruota, Sant'Andrea di Compito, Sant'Andrea in Caprile, San Colombano, San Gennaro, San Ginese di Compito, San Giusto di Compito, San Leonardo in Treponzio, Santa Margherita, San Martino in Colle, San Pietro a Marcigliano, Segromigno in Monte, Segromigno in Piano, Tassignano, Toringo, Tofori, Valgiano, Verciano, Vorno, and Zone.

=== Compito ===
Compito (also Cómpito, Compitese) is a geographical area of in the south-eastern area of Capannori. The area owes its name to the Latin word compĭtum which means crossroads, crossroads or took on the meaning of a small sanctuary located at a crossroads.

Compito occupies an area that corresponds to approximately a little less than a third of the total area of Capannori, of which it is the area with the lowest population density. It is a geographical area that alternates plains, hills and low mountains. To the north it borders with the hamlets of Tassignano and Pieve di San Paolo, to the west with Guamo and Vorno, to the east with the bed of Lake Bientina, while to the south with Monte Pisano and consequently with the Province of Pisa. Compito comprises ten frazioni: Castelvecchio di Compito, Colle di Compito, Colognora di Cómpito, Massa Macinaia, Pieve di Compito, Ruota, Sant'Andrea di Compito, San Ginese di Compito, San Giusto di Compito and San Leonardo in Treponzio. In total the population of all these villages exceeds 7000 inhabitants.

Throughout Compito, numerous fountains offer the population pure water, thanks to the many streams and canals that descend from Monte Serra. The sources have recently been renovated and equipped with a disinfection system, the quality of the water is monitored by periodic checks that guarantee its potability.

The first civilization that established settlements were the Apuani. They soon clashed with their Etruscan neighbours and the Roman legions who were later to prevail. With the fall of the Roman Empire and the barbarian invasions the countryside became depopulated, the level of Lake Bientina rose and neglect of the canals caused an increase in the marshy area across the Compito plain. When the Lombards chose Lucca as the capital of their kingdom, Compito once again acquired considerable strategic importance as feudal lords built many castles and fortifications in the area. For a long time the territory was subject to violent incursions of Pisan, Florentine and mercenary warriors, who wanted to take possession of the Lucca region and its wealth to establish an independent republic. Compito remained under the jurisdiction of Lucca until the annexation to the Grand Duchy of Tuscany in 1848. In the year 1859, reclamation of Lake Bientina was carried out involving extensive hydraulic engineering.

== Points of interest ==
Capannori is characterized by the number of distinctive towers (once used to communicate). Main sights include:

- Aqueduct of Nottolini, Lucca
- Oasi WWF del Bottaccio
- Quercia delle Streghe
- Villa Reale di Marlia
- Villa Torrigiani
- Villa Mansi
- Villa Grabau
- Santi Quirico e Giulitta—12th-century church
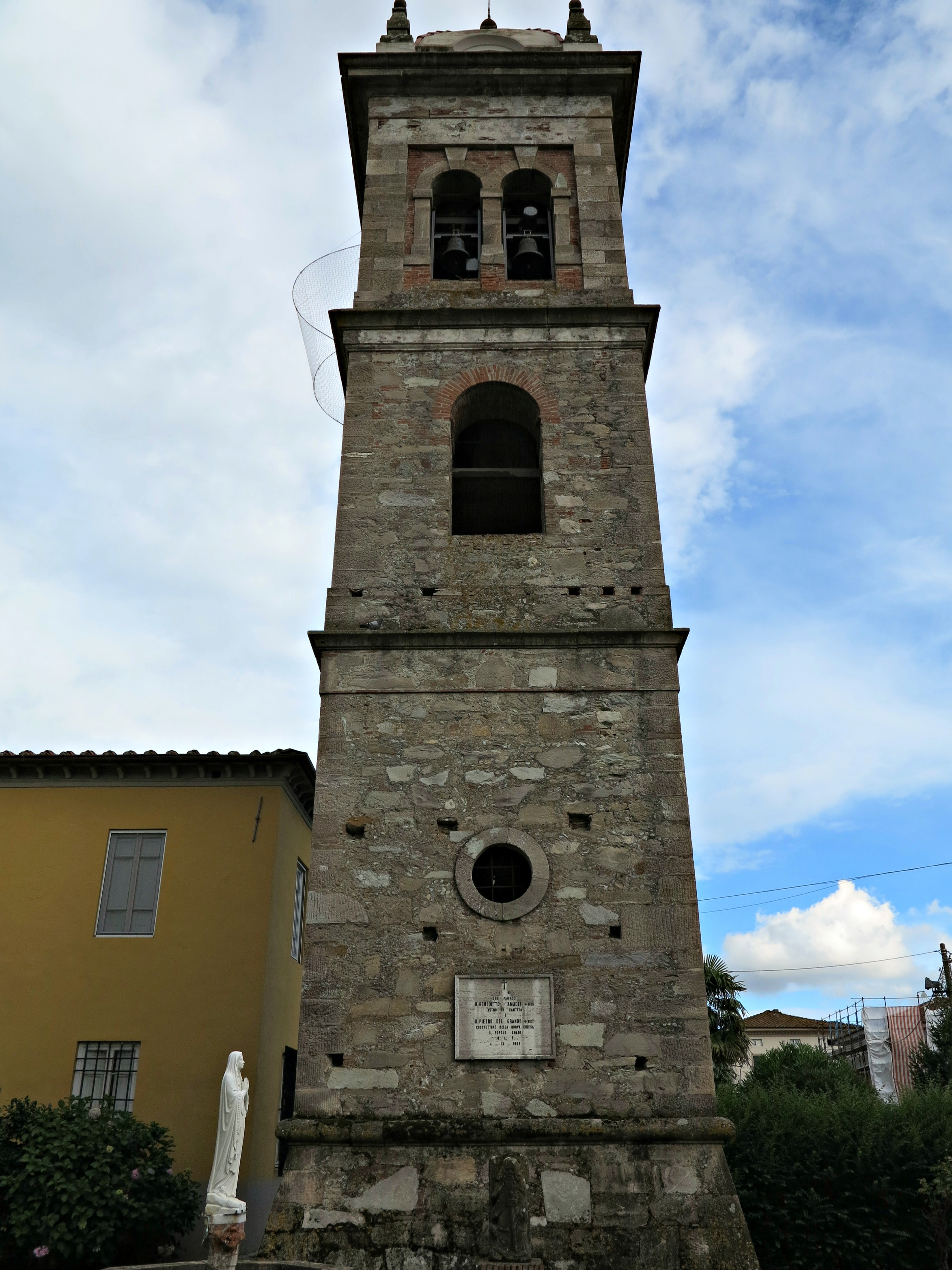
San Leonardo in Treponzio

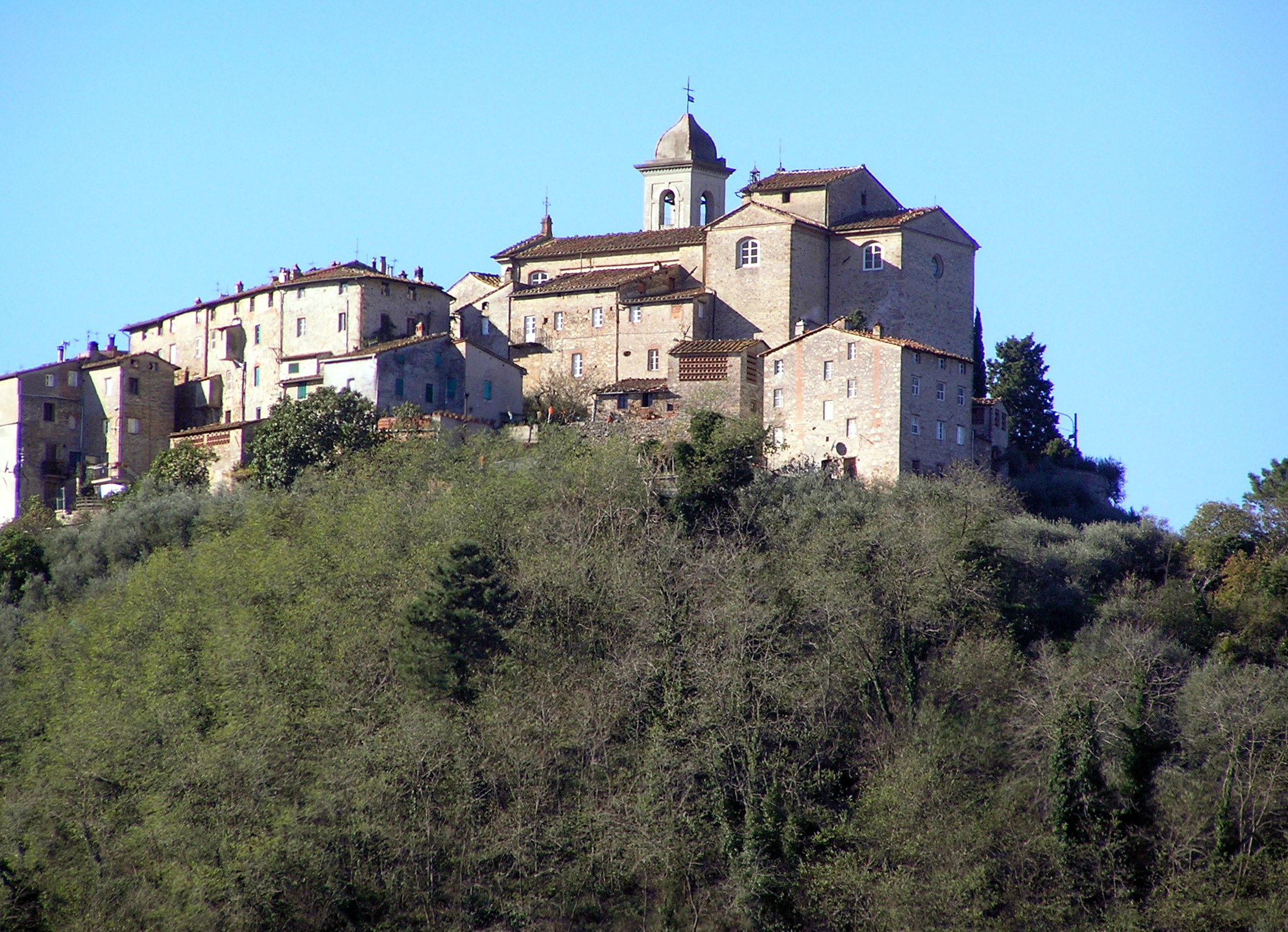
Castelvecchio Alto

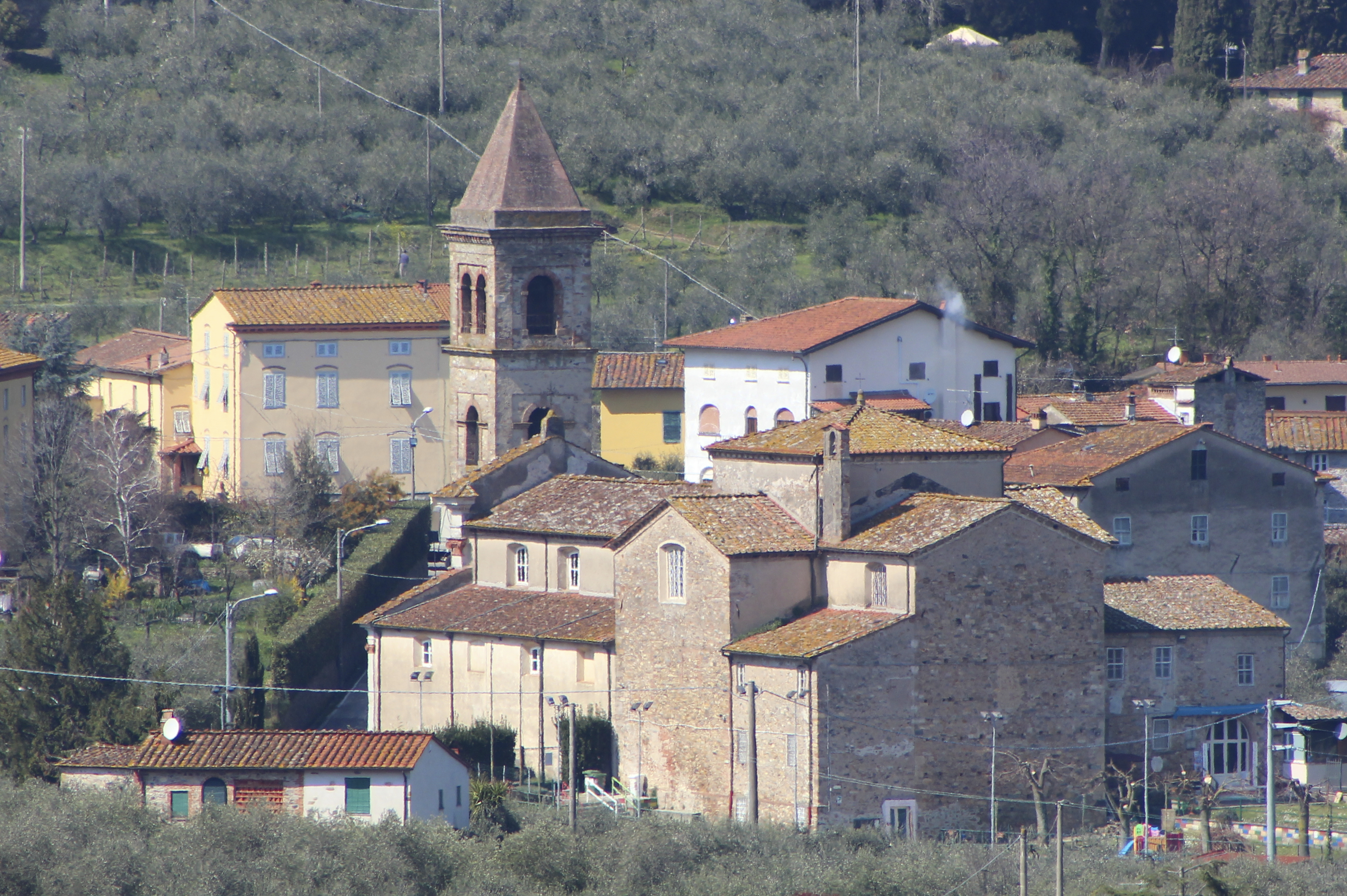
Colle di Compito

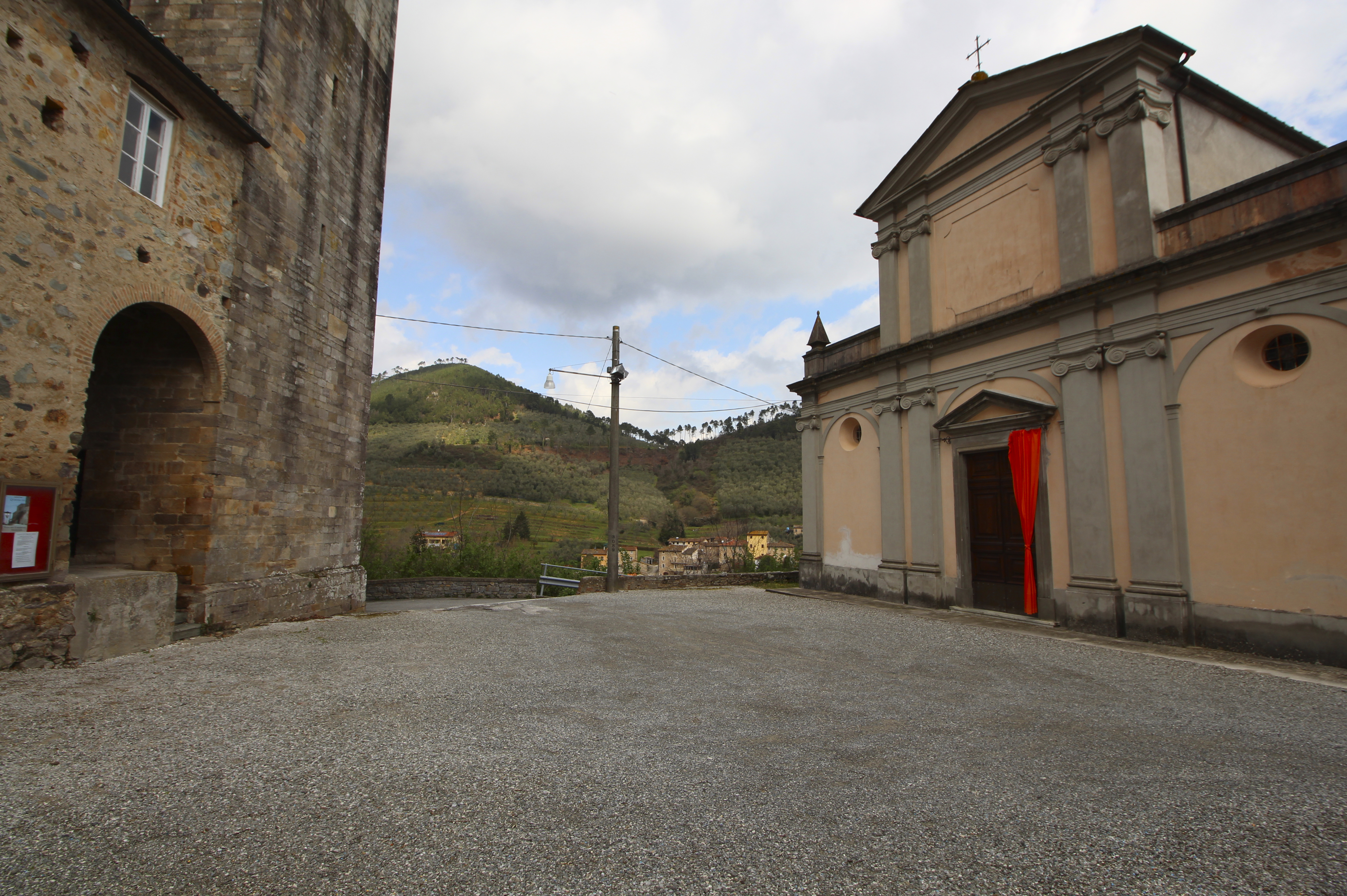
Pieve di Compito

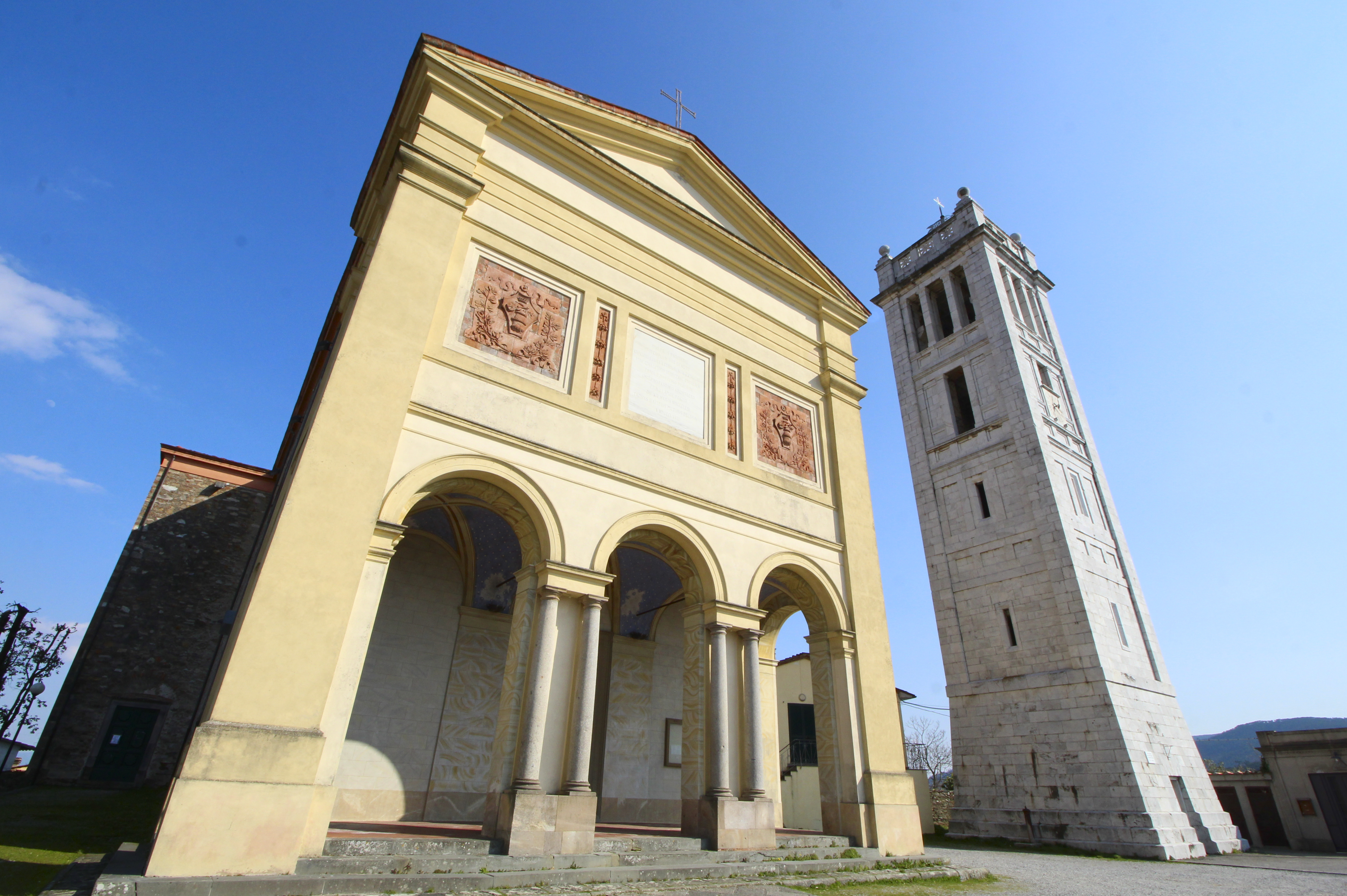
San Ginese

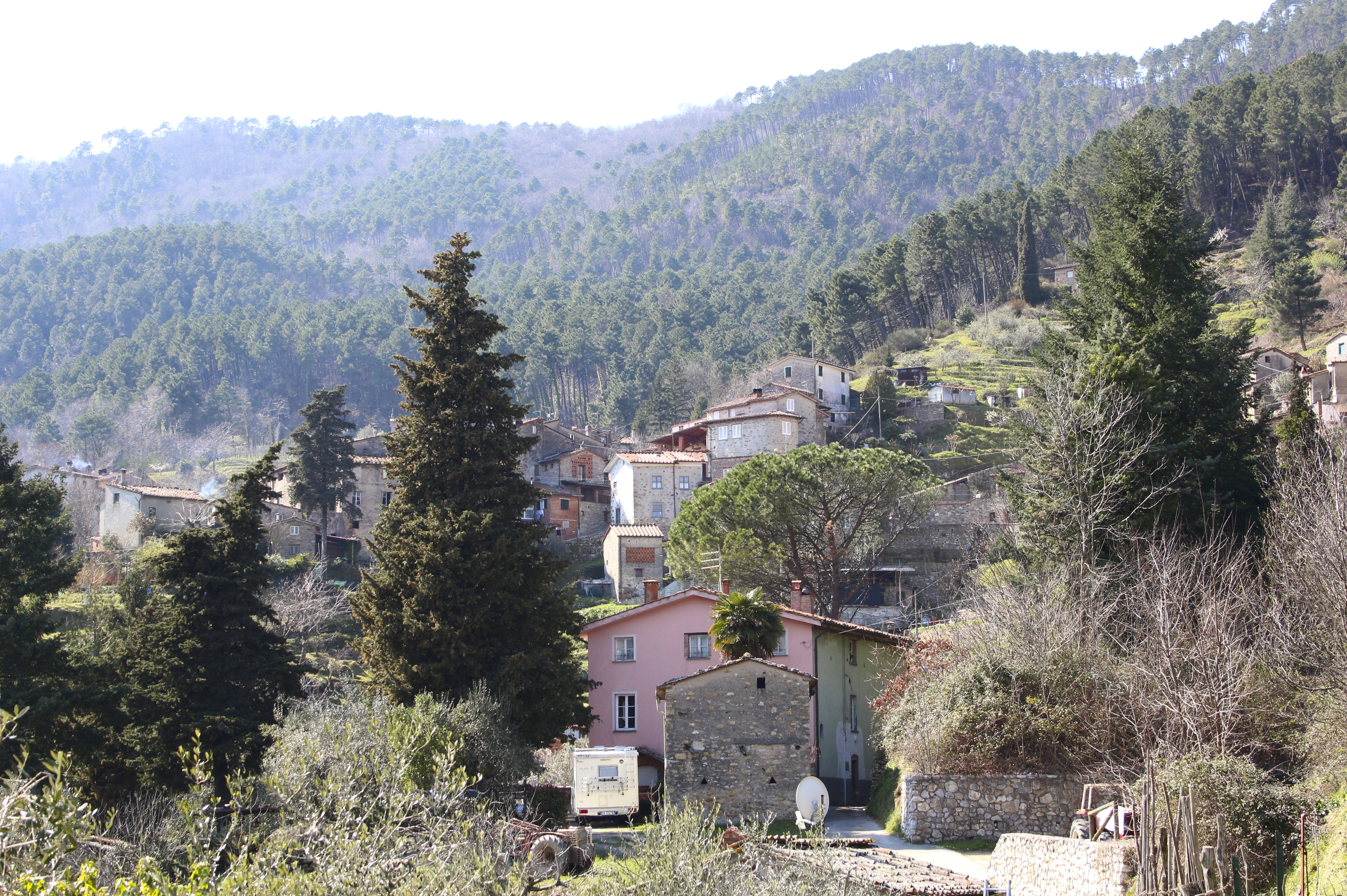
Ruota

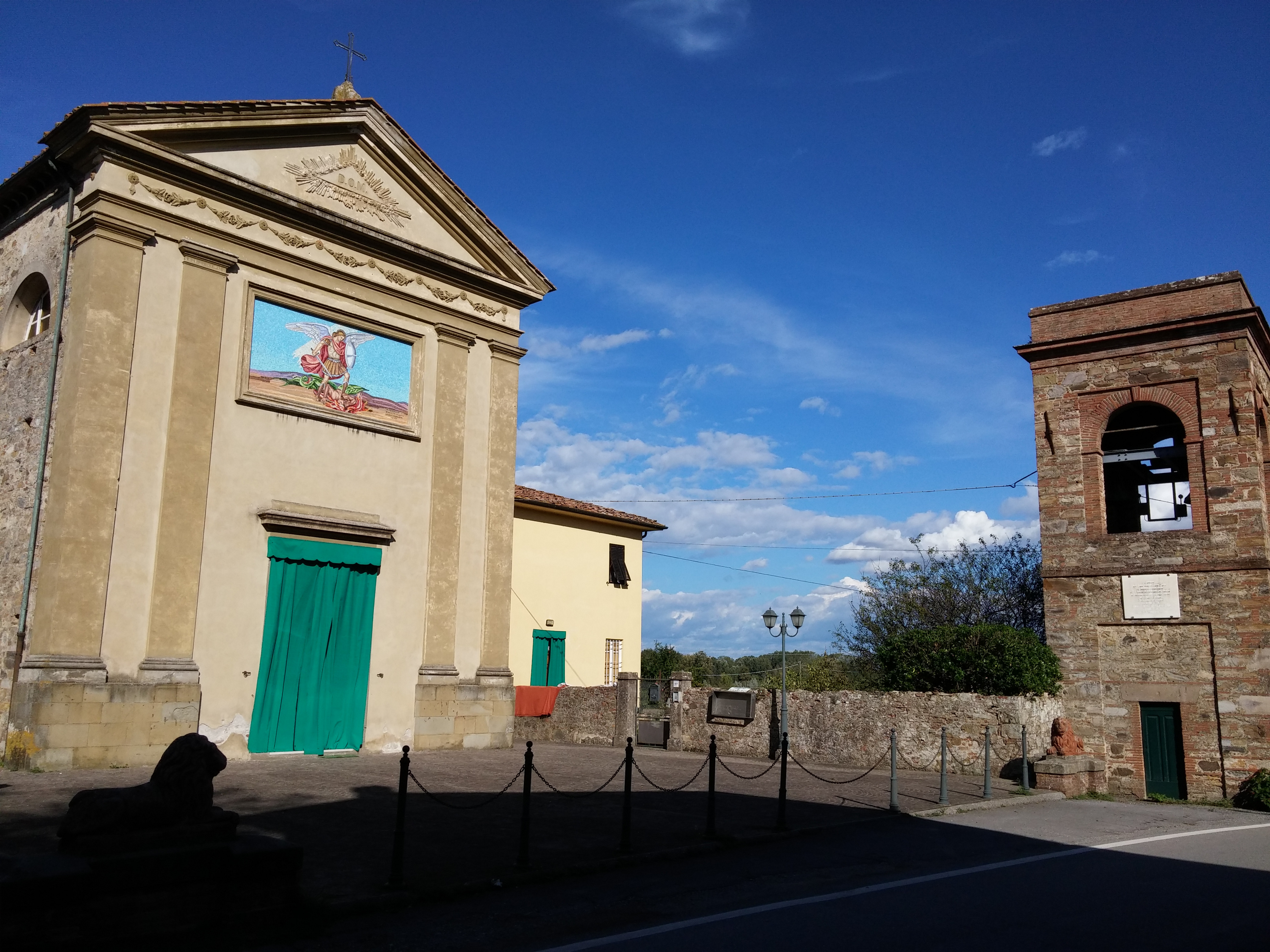
Colognora

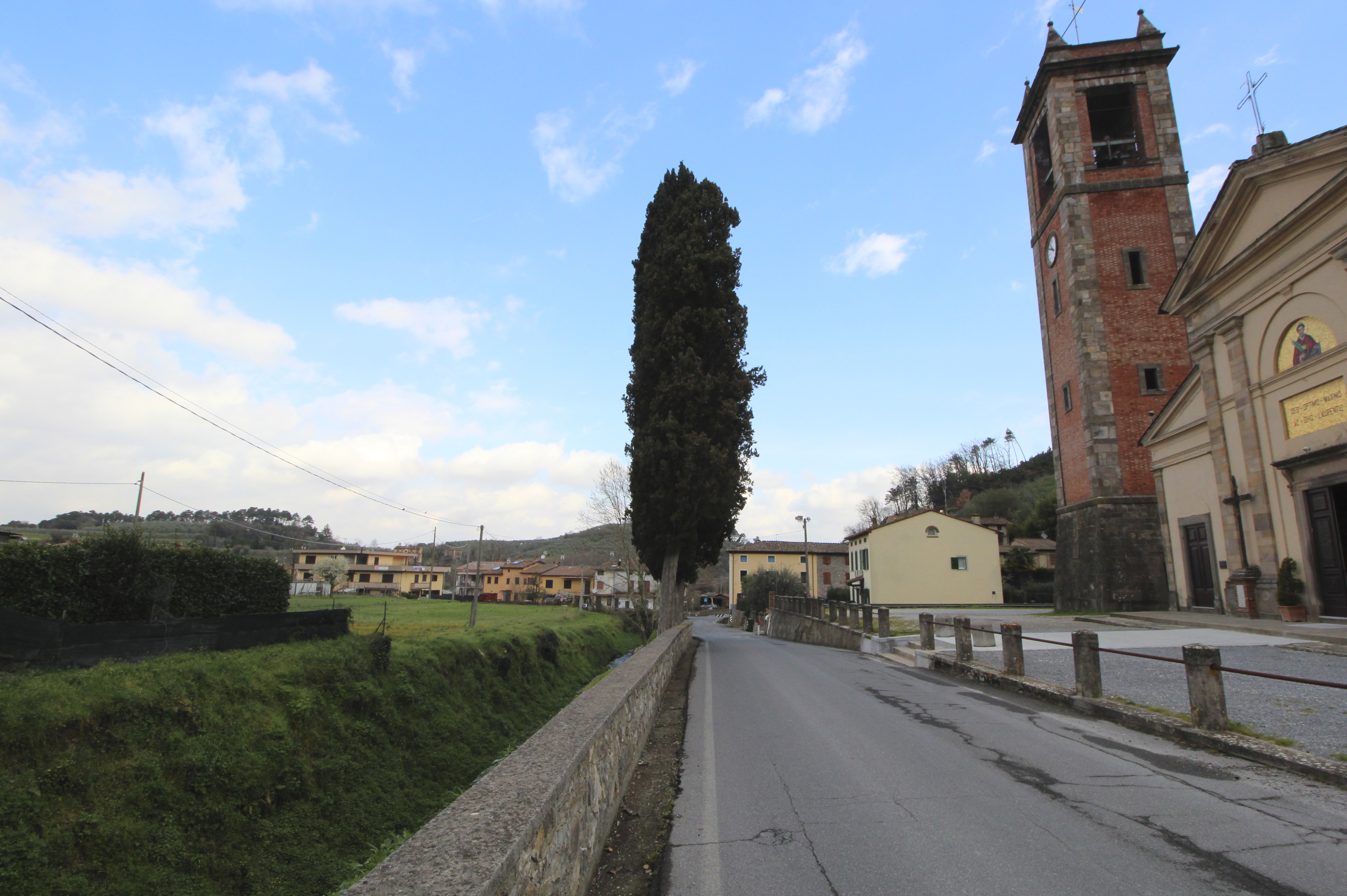
Massa Macinaia

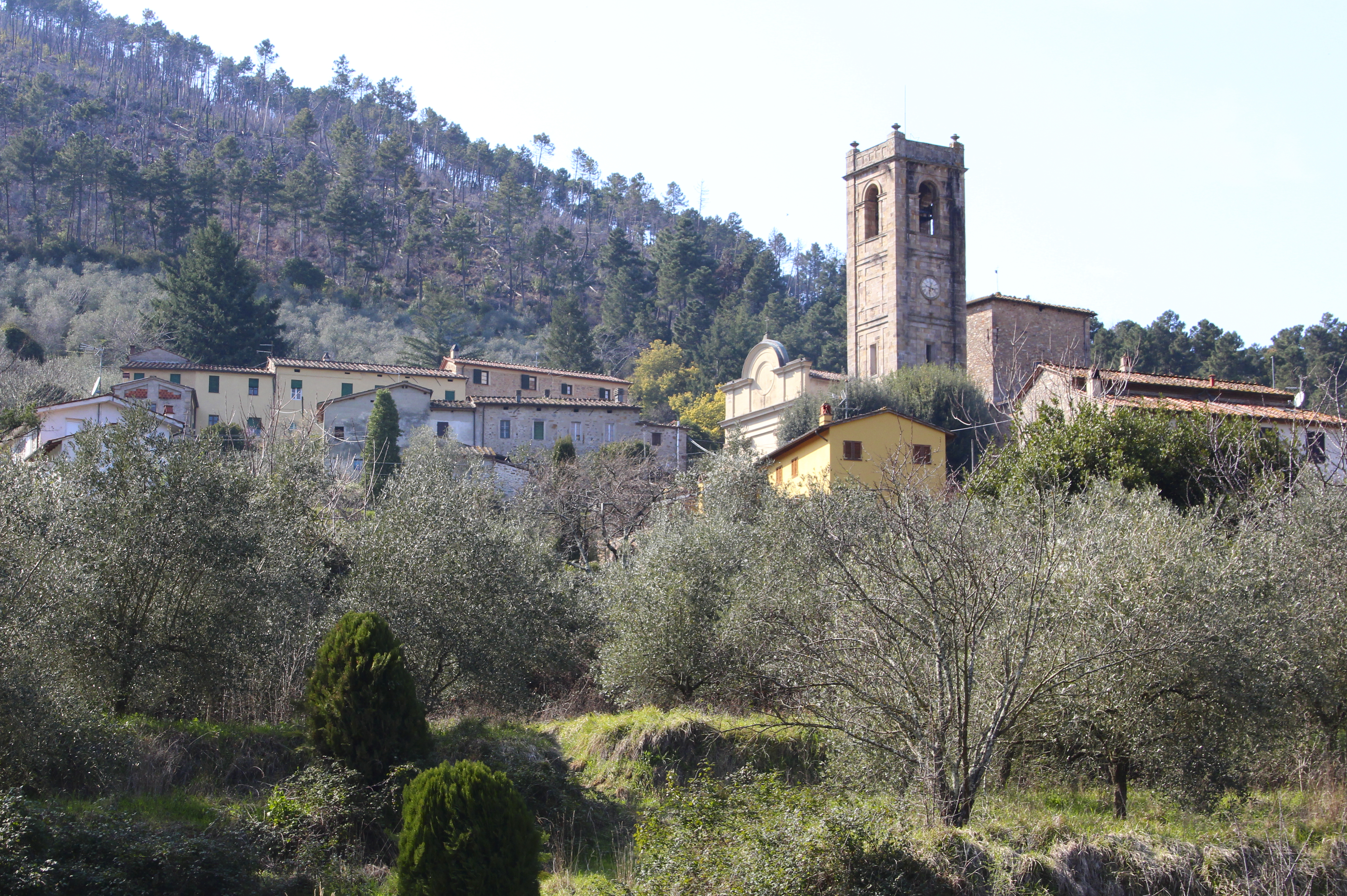
Sant'Andrea di Compito

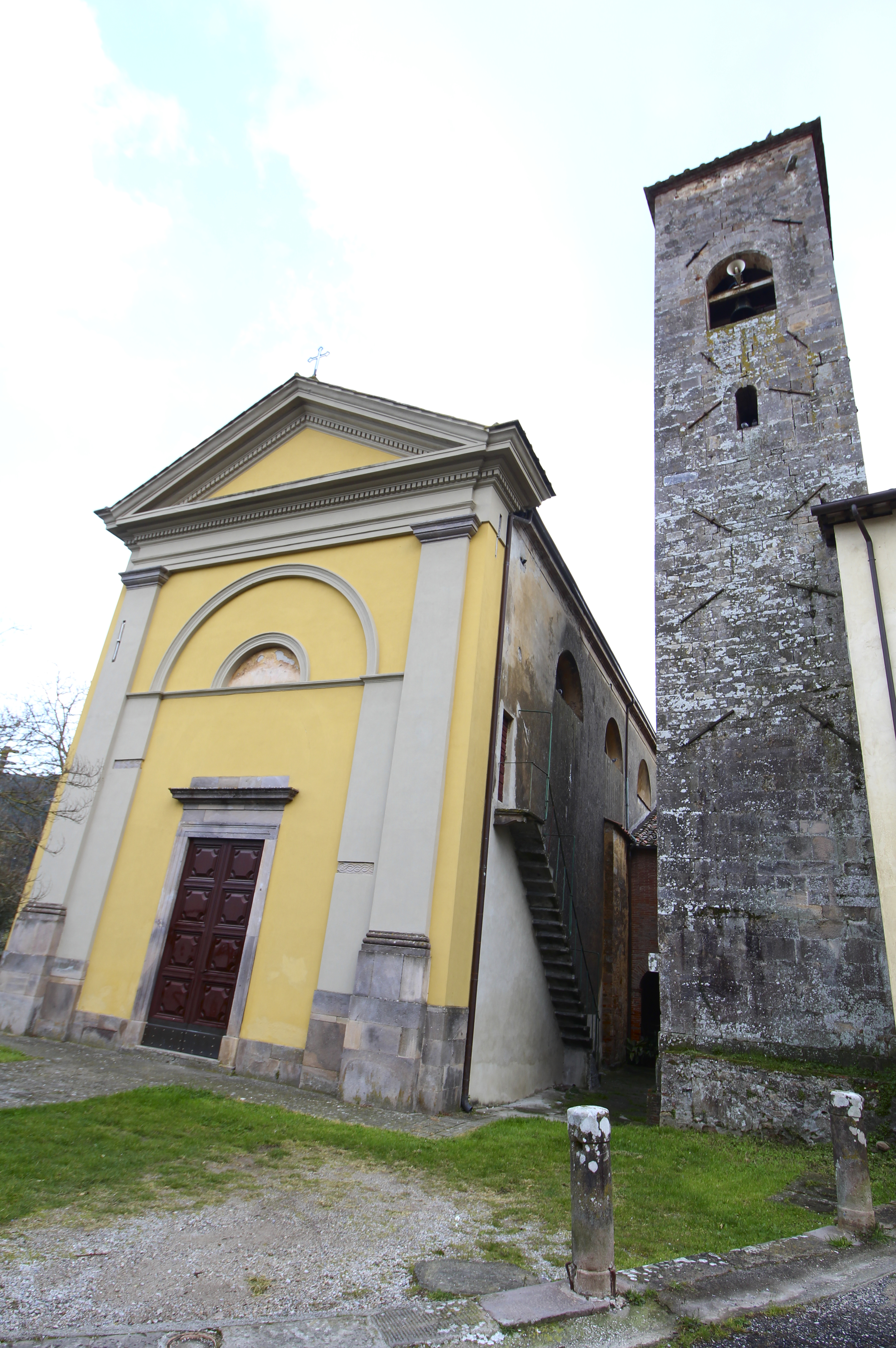
San Giusto

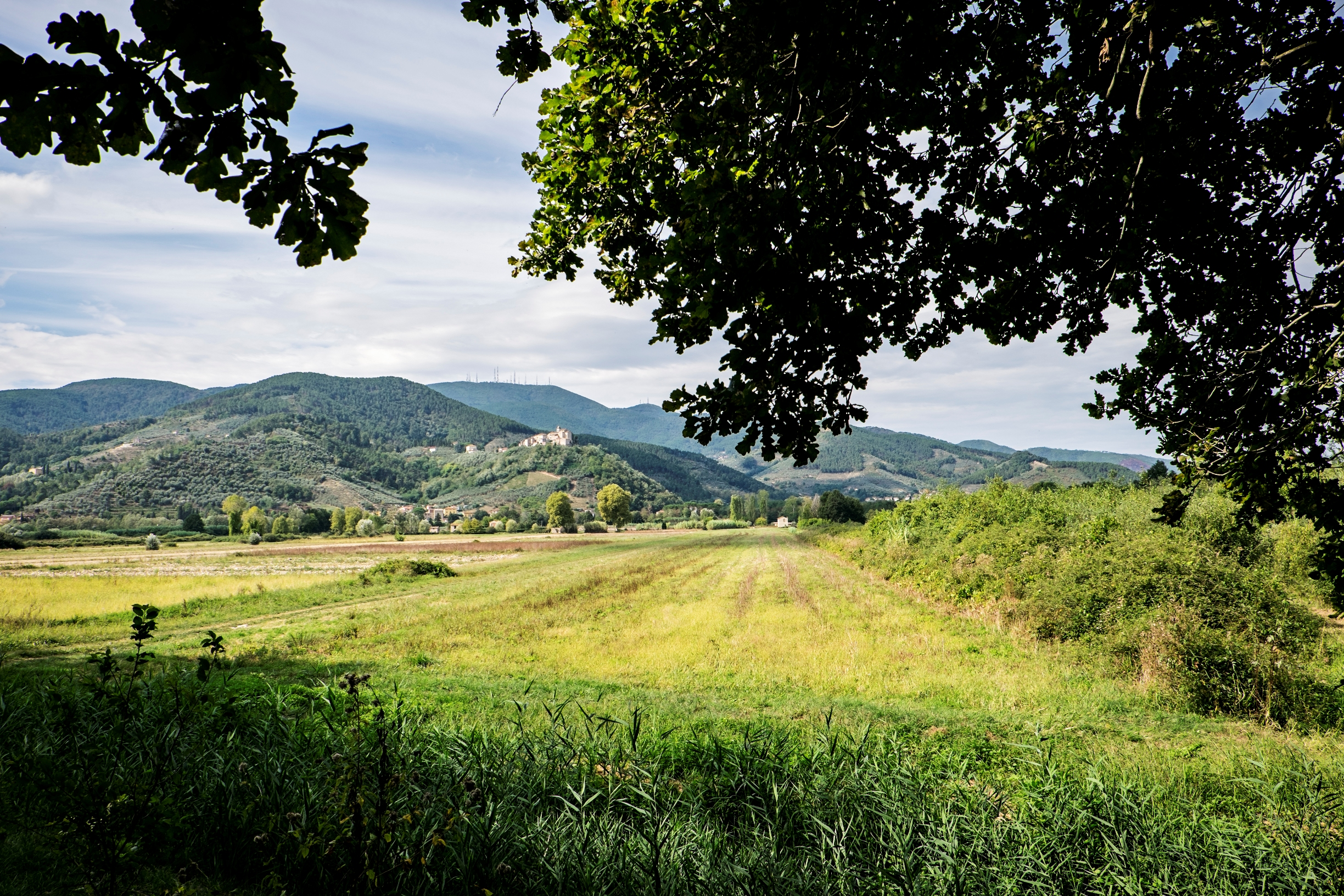
Oasi del Bottaccio

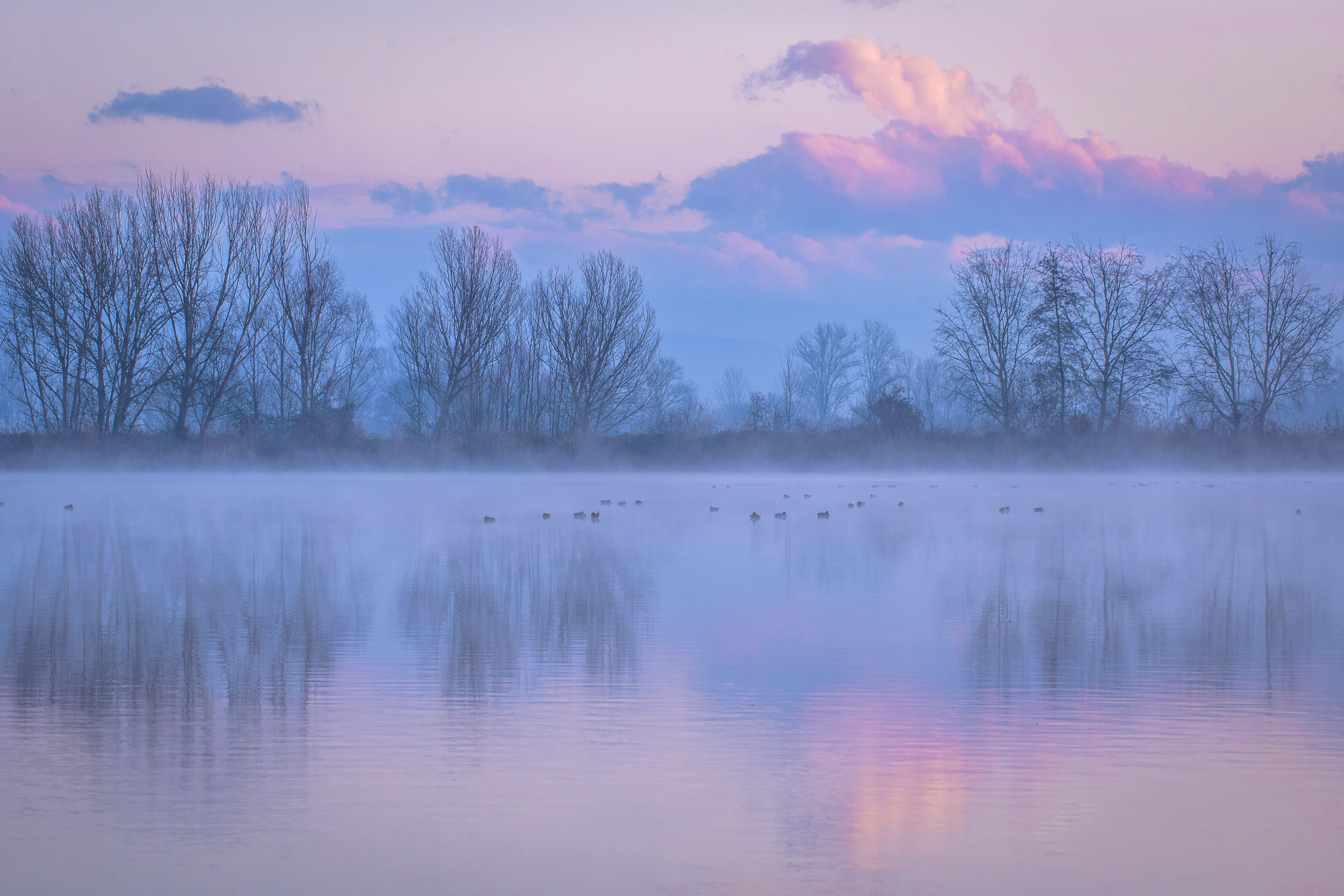
Lago della Gherardesca

== Sister cities ==
- La Gaude, France
- Losheim am See, Germany
- Pirna, Germany
