= Tofanelli =

Tofanelli is an Italian surname. Notable people with the surname include:

- Andrea Tofanelli (born 1965), Italian musician
- Stefano Tofanelli (1752–1812), Italian painter
