= Marracci =

Marracci may refer to:

- Ludovico Marracci (1612–1700), Italian oriental scholar and professor of Arabic
- Giovanni Marracci (1637–1704), Italian baroque painter

== See also ==
- Carmelita Maracci
