= Luigi Pulini =

Italian painter (fl. 19th century)

Luigi Pulini was an Italian painter, mainly specializing in landscape painting.

He was recorded as a native of the Marche region, but he was born in Sicily, and became a resident of Rome where he completed his studies. While in Rome in 1883, he exhibited two canvases depicting: Lave sull'Etna and Il Tevere presso Porta del Popolo a Rome. In the 1884 Esposizione Nazionale of Turin, he exhibited: Prime viole; Strada in Ciociaria (Turin Exhibition, 1884), and other studies. He often exhibited landscapes of Catania, such as A Morning in Sicily, Lave dell'Etna, and Acicastello presso Catania. From 1881 to 1887, Luigi worked as an engraver for the Castellani family, who made jewelry inspired by the archaeological discoveries of the time.

At the Biblioteche riunite Civica e A. Ursino Recupero in Catania, there are two other works by Luigi: Veduta dell'Etna, Paesaggio con il monte Etna; and Scenetta agreste, Scena di vita campestre. These paintings were initially owned by poet Mario Rapisardi, who was probably friends with Luigi and part of the same artistic circle. The second painting has a handwritten note by Luigi to Giselda Fojanesi, Rapisardi's wife at the time. Rapisardi owned another painting by Luigi, a Panorama of Rome under siege, as viewed from the Palazzo Vidoni-Caffarelli. This painting was based on an 1849 drawing by C. Androver, an unknown artist. Luigi's works were praised by Italian art historian Angelo de Gubernatis, and have been likened to the Macchiaioli style common at the time.
