= Gaetano Vetturali =

Italian painter (1701–1783)

Gaetano Vetturali (1701–1783) was an Italian painter.

== Biography ==
He specialized in imaginary landscapes (capricci) also called paesaggios or veduta (landscapes) with architecture and figures. Gaetano was born in Lucca. His initial training was in Bologna. He studied first under Giovanni Domenico Brugieri and Giovanni Domenico Lombardi, the former pupil of Maratta and the latter of Marracci. Subsequently he moved on to study quadratura with Ferdinando Galli Bibiena in Bologna, and figure painting with Vittorio Bigari.

He was strongly influenced by Canaletto. In 1759, he decorated the apartment of the Gonfaloniere in the Palazzo della Signoria in Lucca.
