= Madonna and Child with Saints (Marracci) =

C. 1665 painting by Giovanni Marracci

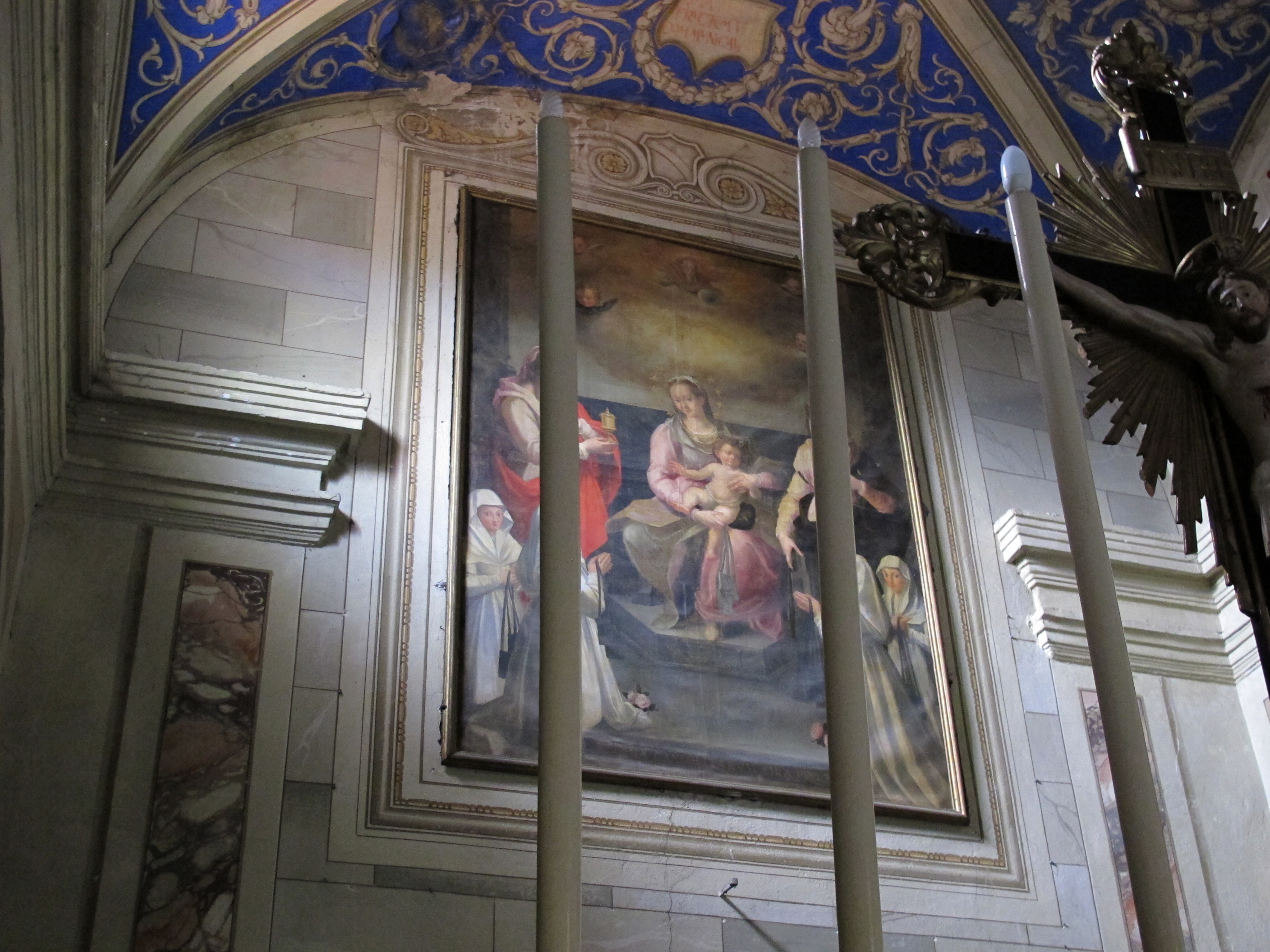

Madonna and Child with Saints is a c.1665 oil on canvas painting by Giovanni Marracci, now in Madonna del Carmine church in Pescaglia. It was commissioned by Paolino Galgani of Piazzanello in 1665. The saints are Paolino, Lucy, Philip Neri, Anthony the Great, Anthony of Padua and Elizabeth of Hungary.
