= Lazzaro Baldi =

Italian painter and engraver (c. 1624–1703)

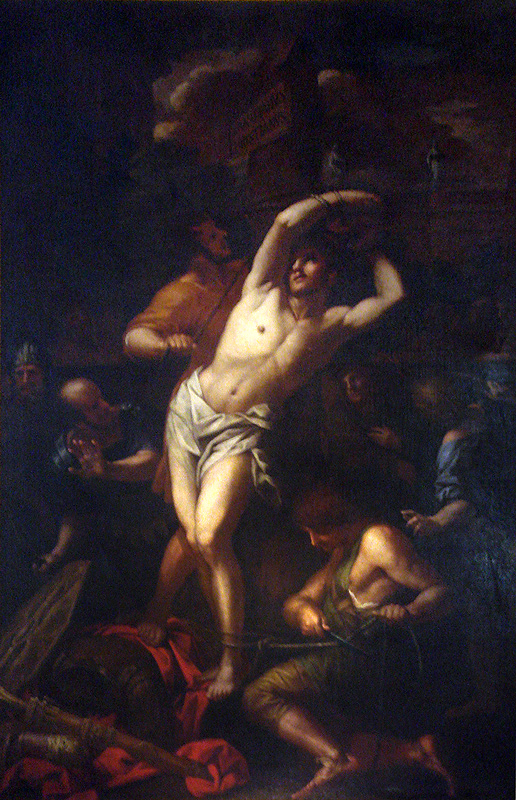
- St. Sebastian, Cortona Cathedral
- Born: Lazzaro Baldi; 1624; Pistoia, Italy
- Died: 1703 (aged 78–79); Rome, Italy
- Known for: Painting, Engraving
- Movement: Baroque
- Patrons: Pietro da Cortona

Lazzaro Baldi (c. 1624 – 30 March 1703) was an Italian painter and engraver of the Baroque period active mainly in Rome.

== Biography ==
=== Study ===
Baldi was born in Pistoia around 1624. He is initially believed to have been a pupil of a little known Francesco Leoncini in his native city. Attracted by the fame of his fellow Tuscan Pietro da Cortona and seeking his instruction, he sought da Cortona in Rome, where he was welcomed. Pascoli said that he obtained his first commissions through da Cortona, under whom he became adept at fresco technique.

=== Work ===
The first public work was probably the St Francis painted in the third chapel to the left in the church of San Marco in Rome, dating back to the seventeenth century decoration of the church (1653–56). He painted a David and Goliath for Alexander VII in the Palazzo Quirinale, where his style evolved into a choice of light tones that are typical of his style and is today most noticeable in his frescoes.

Gradually, Baldi came to personal interpretation of Cortona's style, by then the dominant style in Rome along with style represented by Andrea Sacchi. He accepted compositional formulas and the typology, but not the baroque impetus. In the representation of the landscape, he was influenced by Gaspar Dughet – the French artist who painted the background in the Creation of Adam and Eve – and also by Pier Francesco Mola's background in the altarpiece The Rest During the Flight to Egypt.

=== Religious commissions ===
He also painted frescoes for the church of San Giovanni in Oleo (1658), and San Giovanni in Patmos (1660–1665) for San Giovanni in Laterano. He also painted an altarpiece of the Martyrdom of St. Lazarus for the church of Santi Luca e Martina. He also worked in Camerino, Pistoia (an Annunciation for the church of San Francesco and a Repose in Egypt for the Umilta) and Perugia (Casa Borgia-Montemellino). As an engraver, Baldi is known for a plate on The Conversion of St. Paul.

== Gallery ==
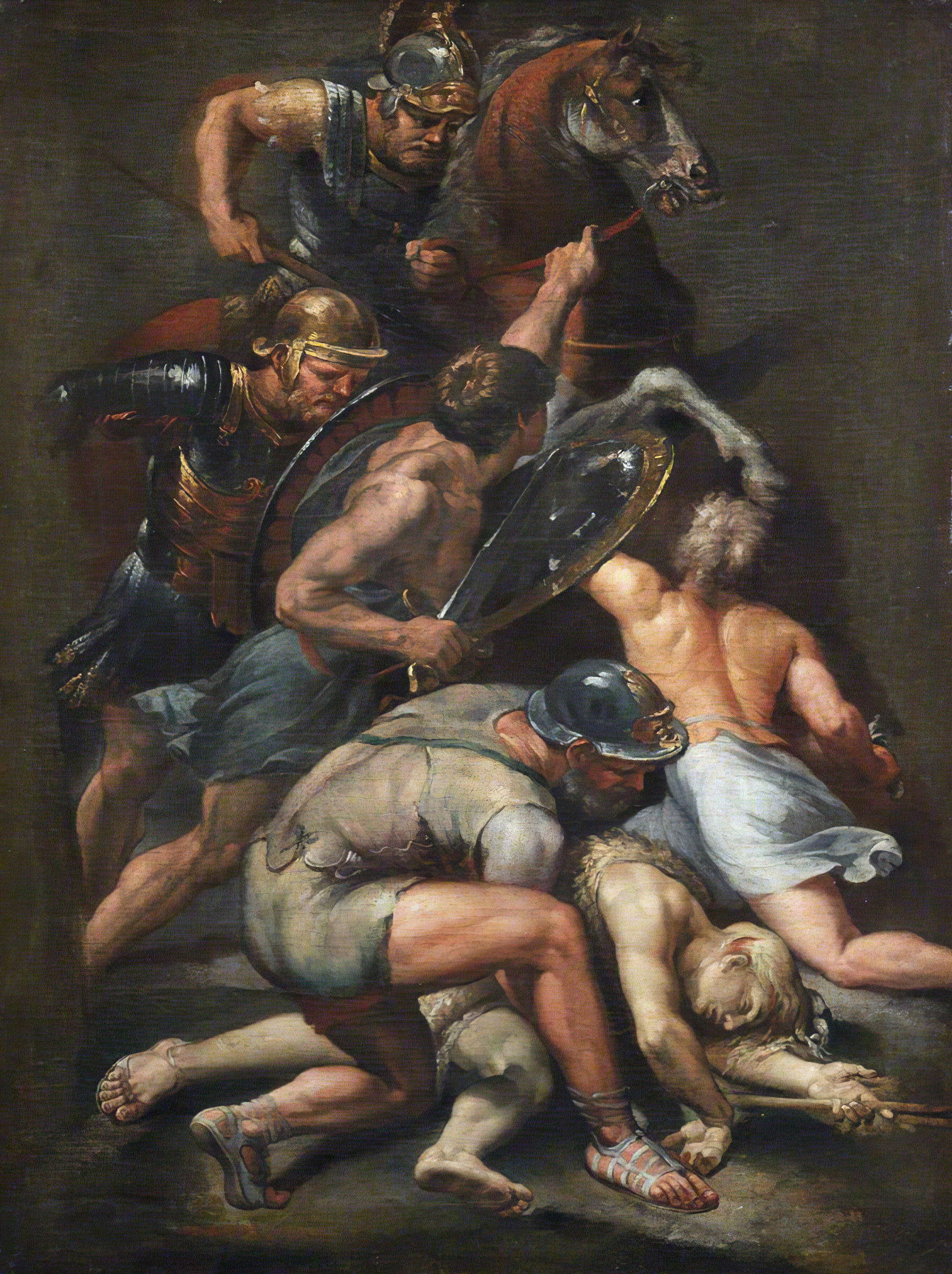
Battle of Constantine and Maxentius (detail-of-fresco-in-Vatican-Stanze) c. 1650

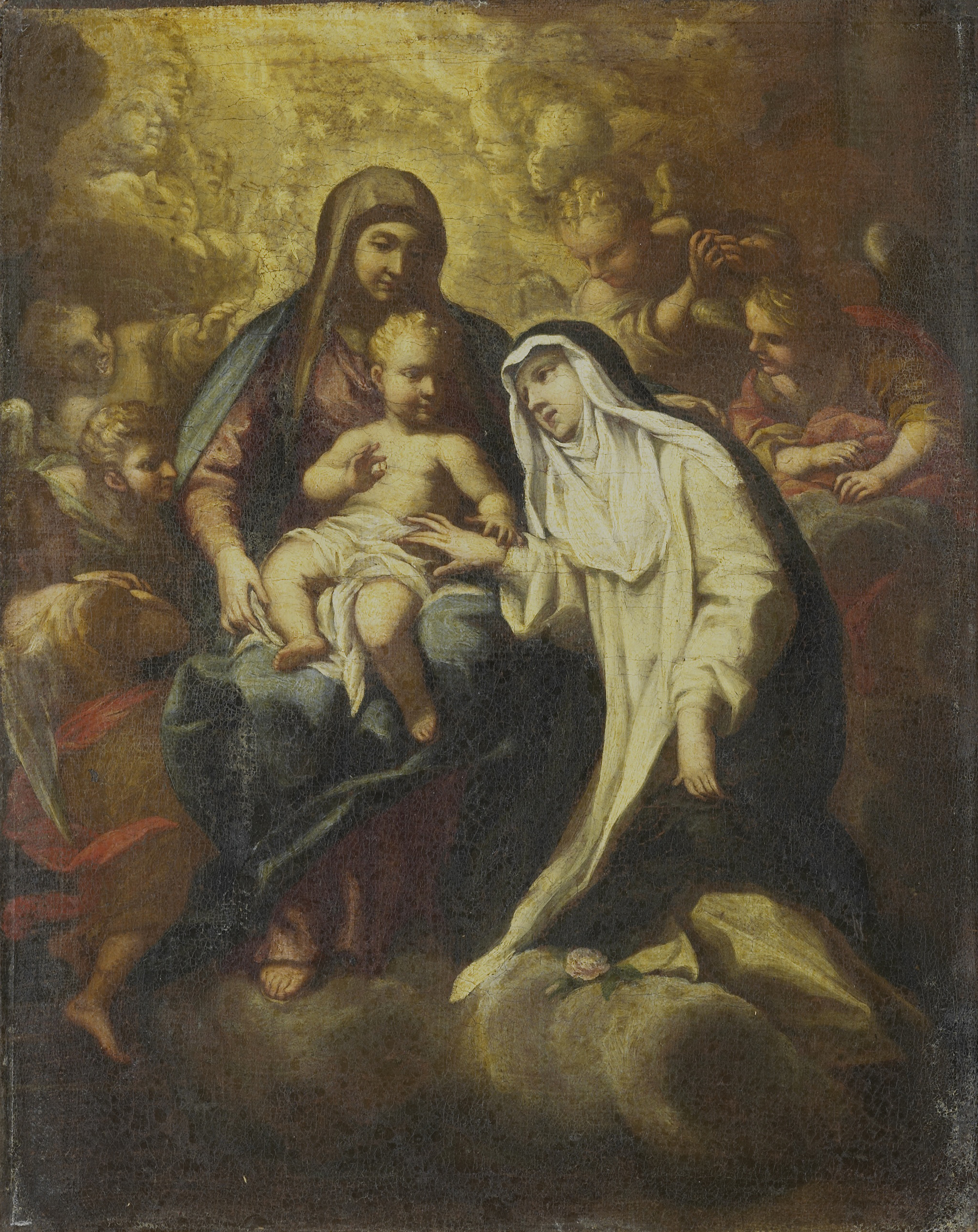
The mystical marriage of Saint Rosa of Lima

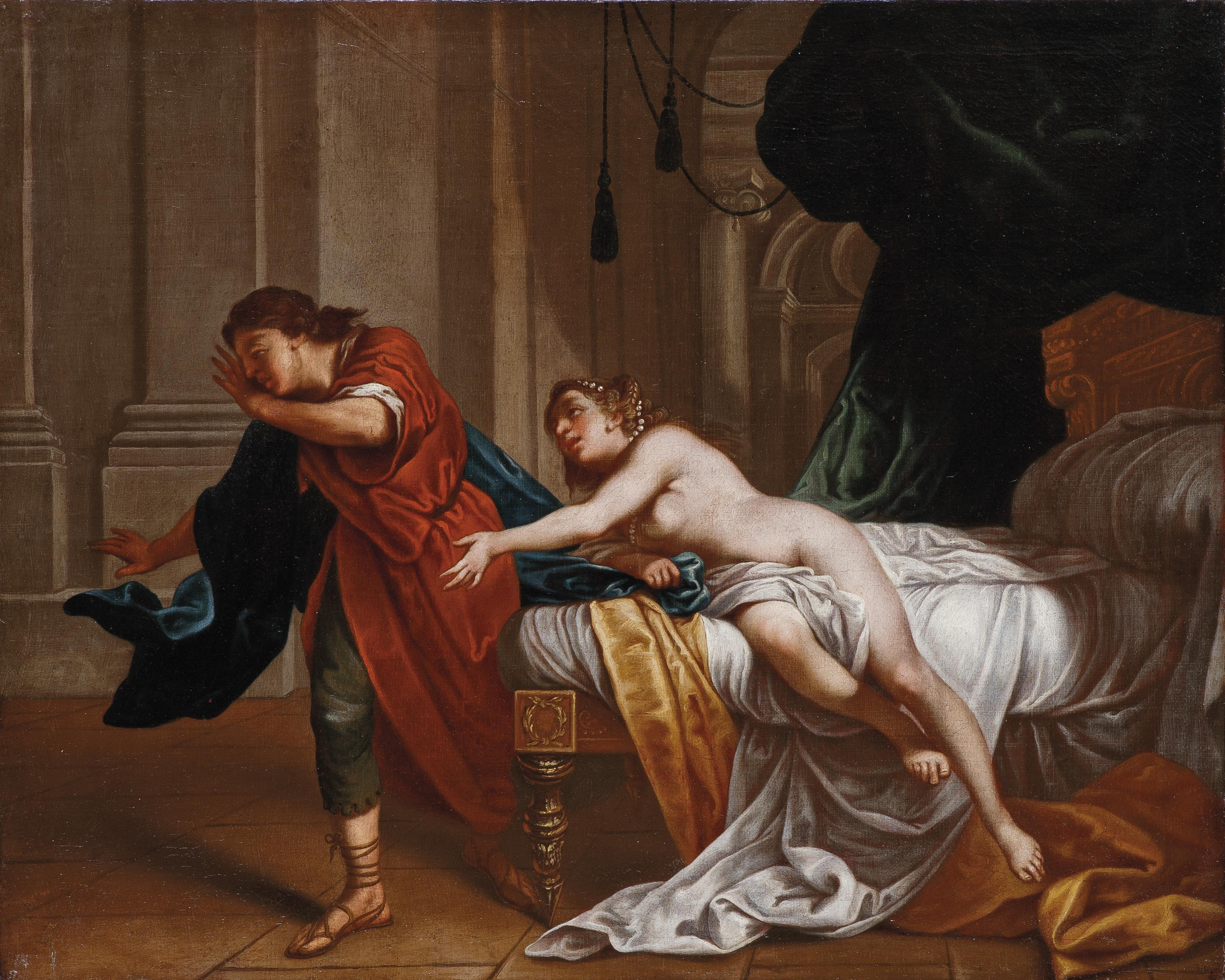
Joseph and the Wife of Potiphar

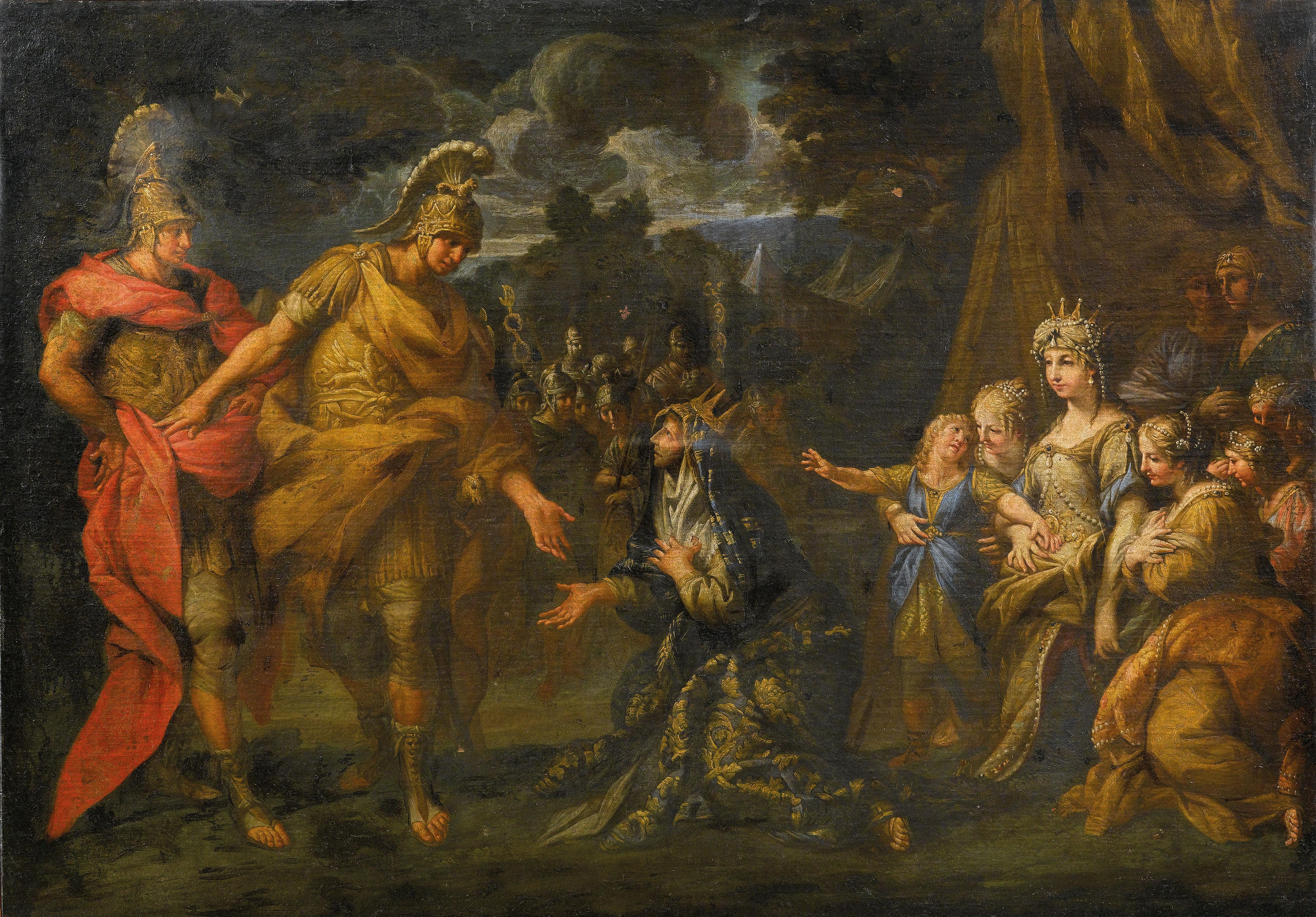
The family of Darius before Alexander the Great

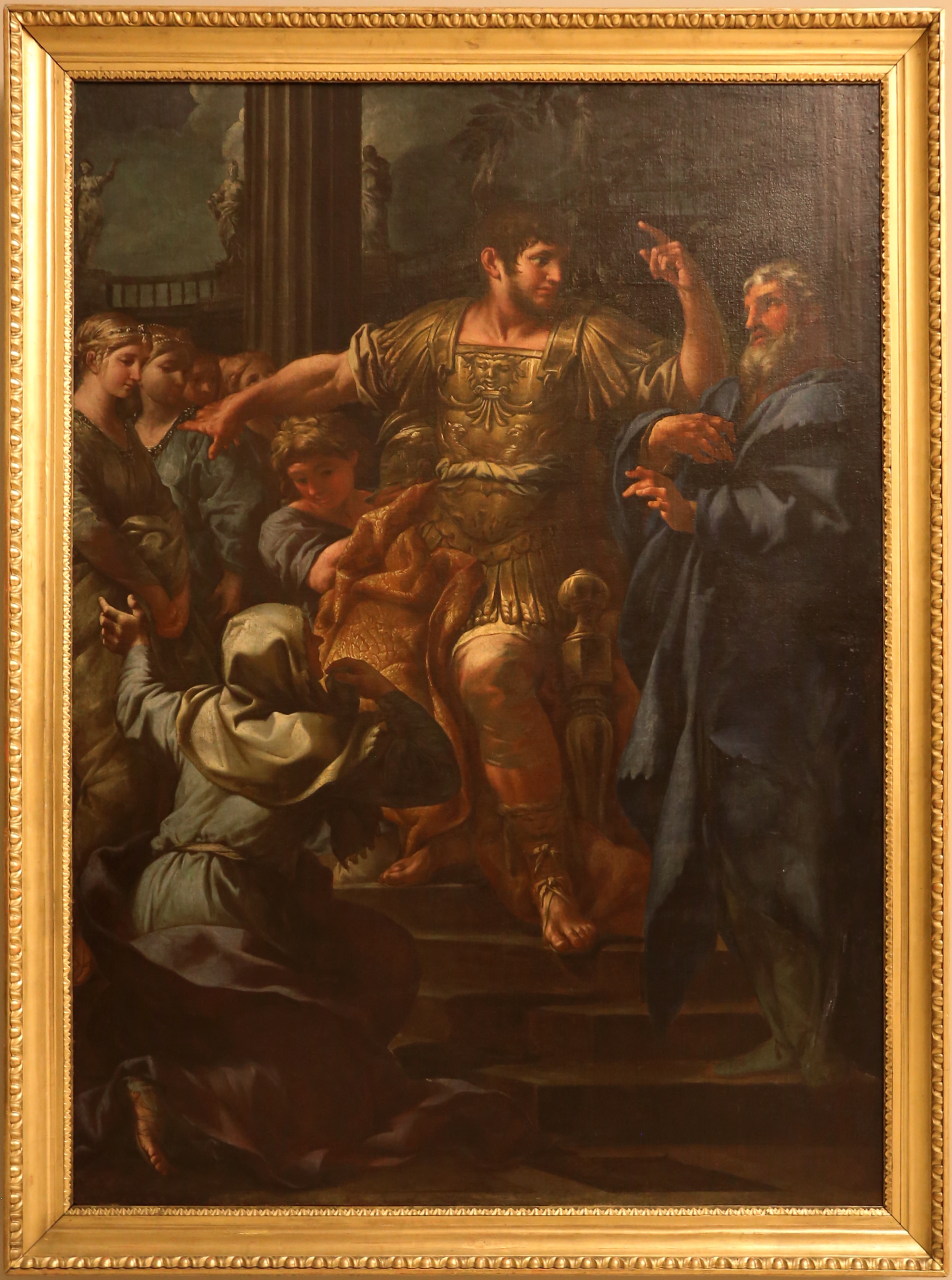
The Continence of Scipio

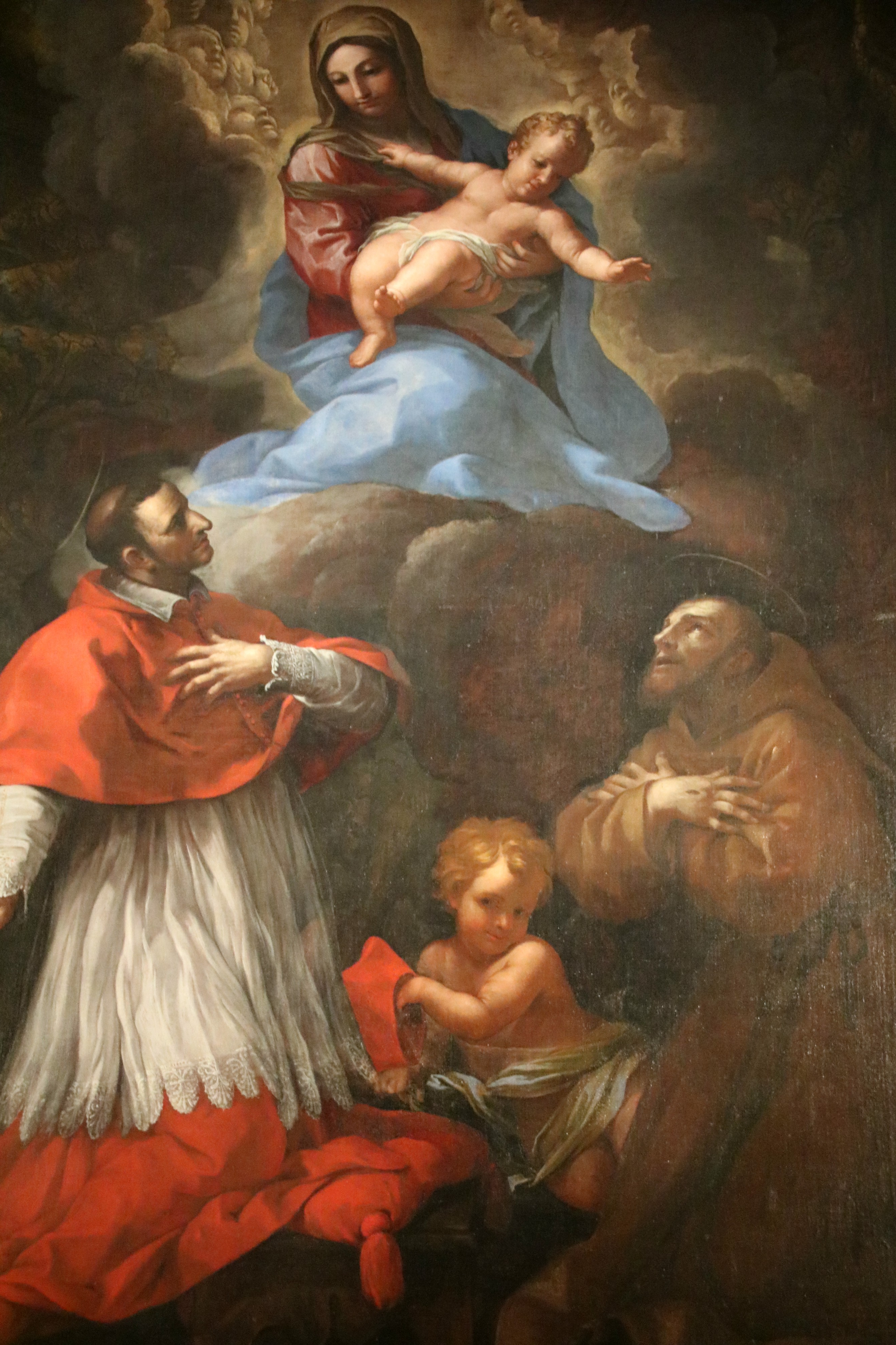
Madonna and Child in the Church of San Fillippo (Fossombrone)

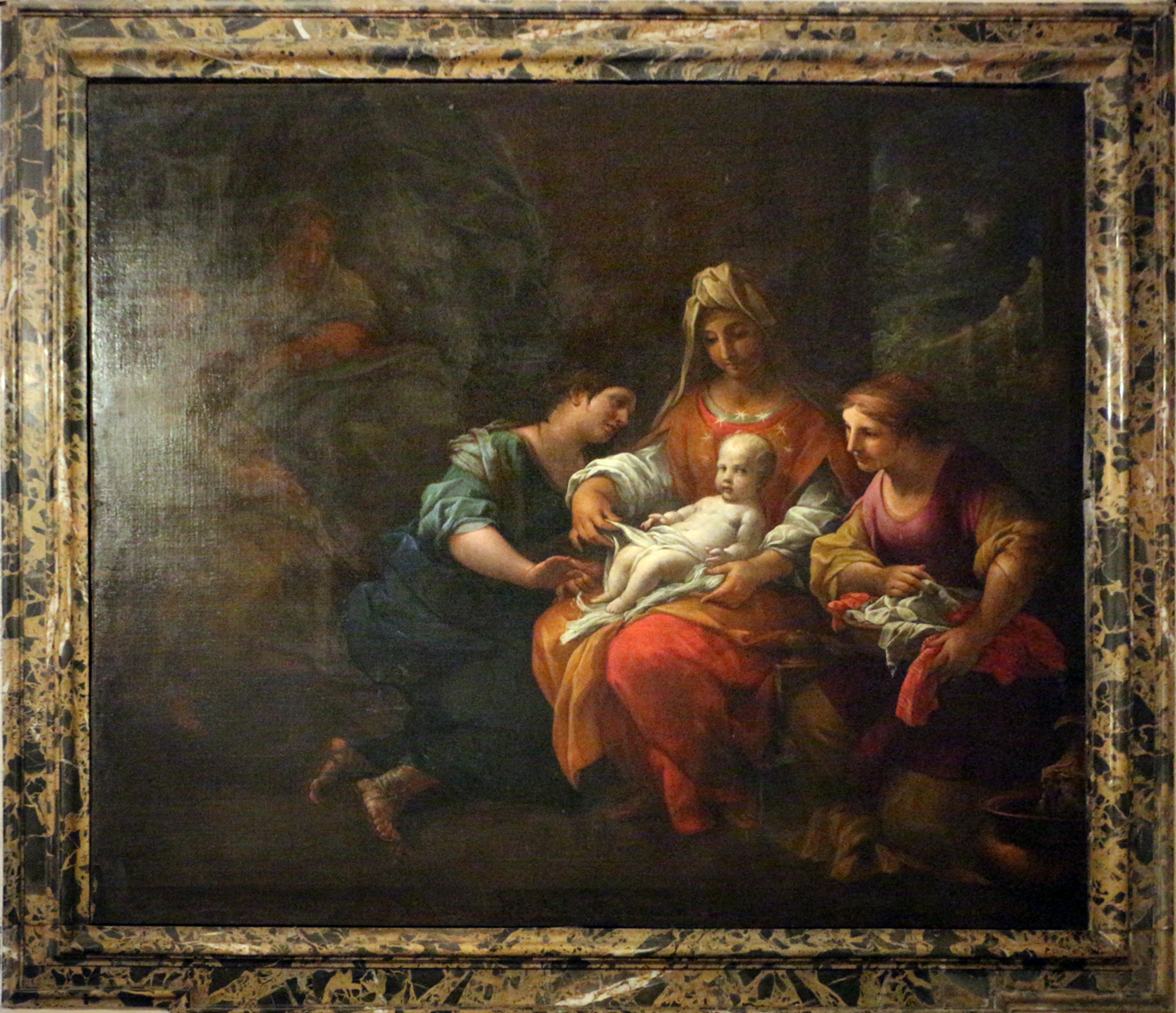
The Nativity in the Church of Santa Pudenziana (Rome)

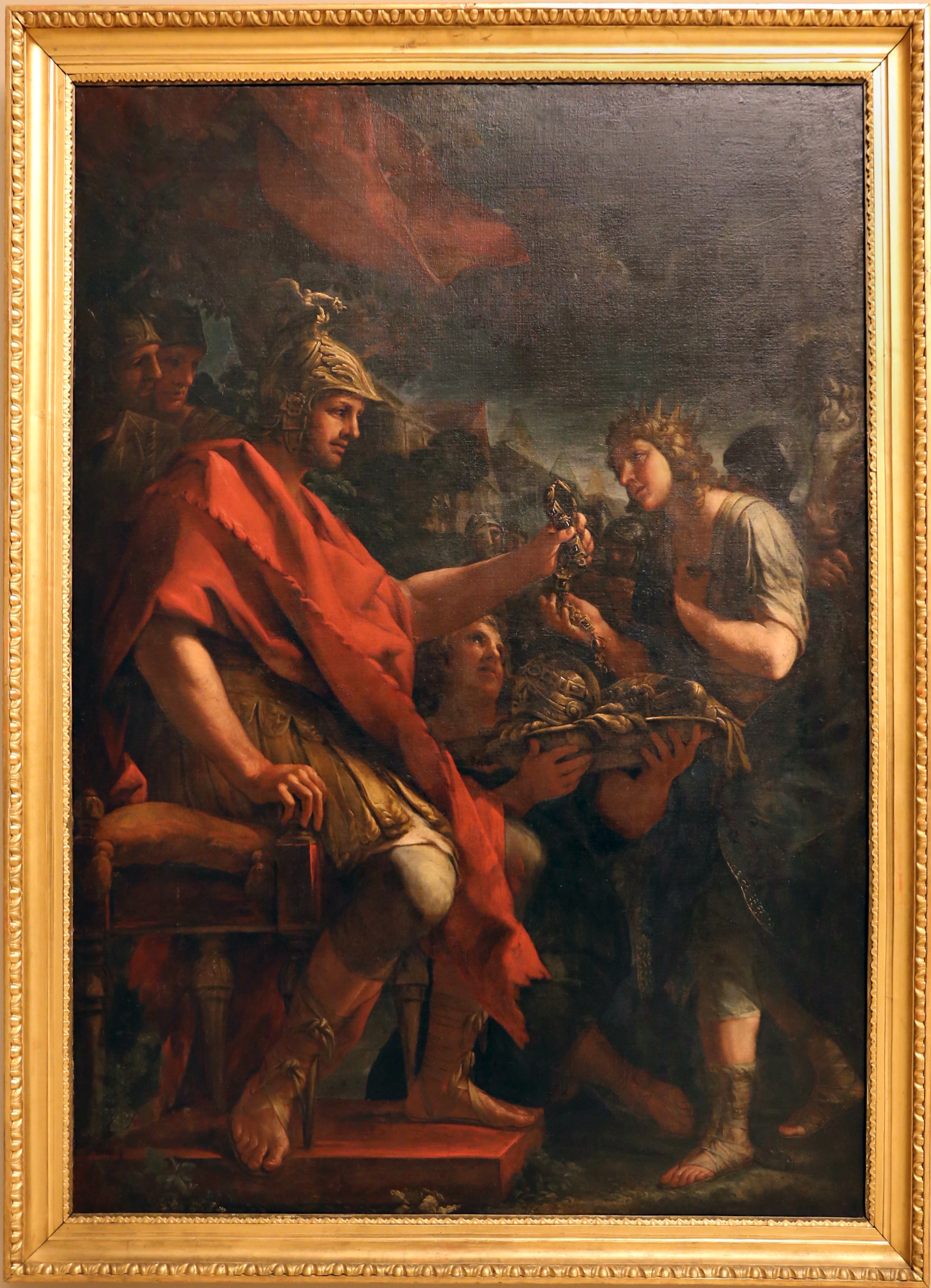
Scipio presents gifts to the king of Numidia, Massinissa

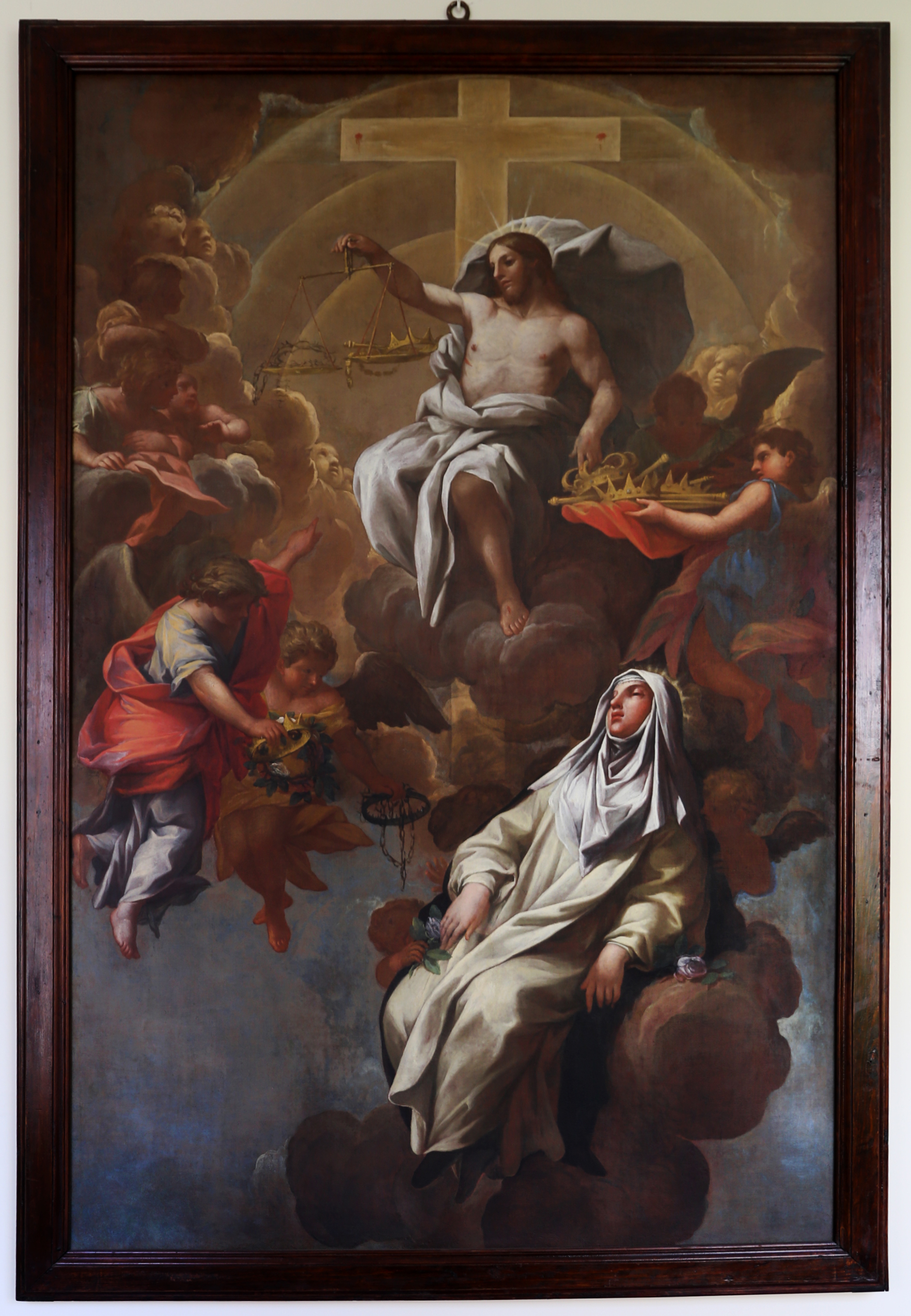
Vision of Saint Catherine with Christ and the crowns at the Convent of Santa Sabina in Rome

=== Teaching ===
In 1695, he became principe of the Accademia di San Luca in Rome. One of his pupils was Giovanni Domenico Brugieri.

=== Death ===
Baldi died in Rome in 1703.

== See also ==
- Bryan, Michael (1886). Robert Edmund Graves (ed.). Dictionary of Painters and Engravers, Biographical and Critical. Vol. I: A-K. London: George Bell and Sons. p. 71.
- Italy cyberguide entry
