= Georg Christoph Martini =

Italian painter

Georg Christoph Martini or Giorgio Cristoforo Martini, also called il Sassone (the Saxon) (died 21 December 1745) was a German-Italian painter, engraver, travel writer, archeologist, and antiquarian.

== Biography ==
He was born in Bad Langensalza in then Saxony. he came to Lucca to learn painting. He served as a secretary for the Ambassador from Lucca to Vienna, Carol Mansi during 1736-1742. Among his pupils in 1725 was Giuseppe Antonio Luchi. He wrote in German three volumes of In italia (1721-1745). He described and illustrated many Roman and Etruscan antiquities found in the region of Lucca. He also had an eye to natural landscapes and flora and fauna.

While he died in Lucca, he was buried in the first Dutch-German cemetery in Livorno, known as the "Dutch Garden", which he had visited in 1725 and describes in his travel journal. This cemetery was dismantled in 1924, the remains and headstones being transferred to the current Dutch-German cemetery in Via Mastacchi. He had no wife or heirs.
