= Giovanni Domenico Brugieri =

Italian painter (1678–1744)

Giovanni Domenico Brugieri (1678–1744) was an Italian painter of the late-Baroque period in Lucca. Lanzi is cited as referring to him as either Giovanni Domenico or in other places as Giovanni Batista or Battista.

== Biography ==
He was initially a pupil of Lazzaro Baldi in Rome, but then joined the large studio of Carlo Maratta. His works are to be seen in the Chapel of the Sacrament at the Servi, the church of the Santissima Trinita, and in other edifices at Lucca. Among his pupils were Gaetano Vetturali and Giuseppe Antonio Luchi.
