= Michele Ridolfi =

Italian painter

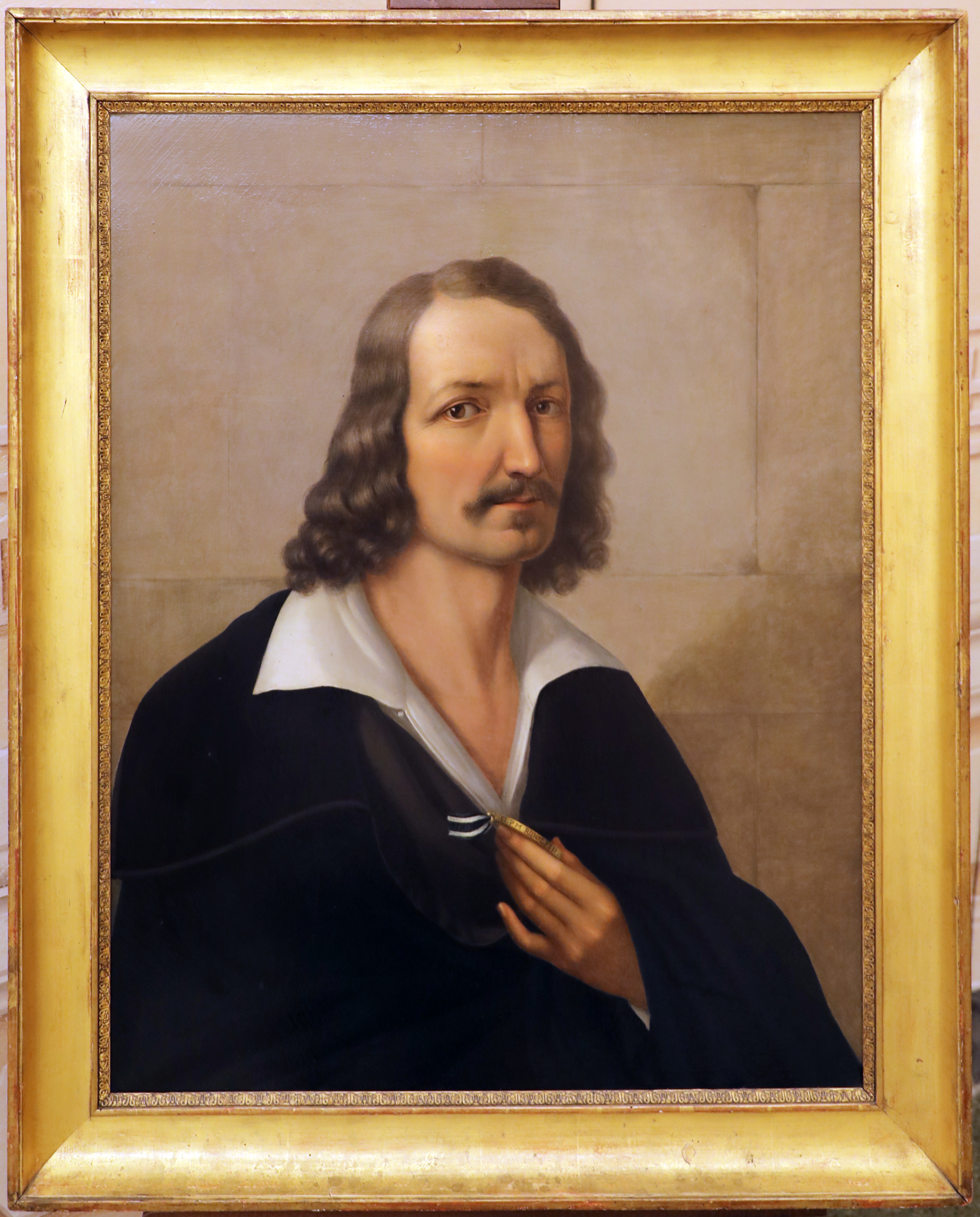
Selfportrait

Michele Ridolfi (Gragnano, September 29, 1793 – Lucca, November 1, 1854) was an Italian painter and art critic.

== Biography ==
He was a pupil of Stefano Tofanelli in Lucca. He specialized in painting with encaustic, and painted the walls of the apse of Sant Alessandro in Lucca.

He moved to Rome in 1813 to study with various artists, including a colony of German artists, principally Peter von Cornelius and Johann Friedrich Overbeck. His First Council of the Apostles under the Presidency of St. Peter was painted in Rome. His Enthroned Madonna received two gold medals and a crown of laurel from the Pope. He restored Amico Aspertini's frescoes in the Basilica di San Frediano at Lucca with great skill. Ridolfi was an honorary member of the Dresden Academy.

He should not be confused with Michele Tosini, the Renaissance painter from Florence called Michele di Ridolfo because he worked for Ridolfo del Ghirlandaio.
