= Santissima Trinità, Lucca =

Church in Lucca, Tuscany, Italy

Coordinates: 43.8426°N 10.5103°E

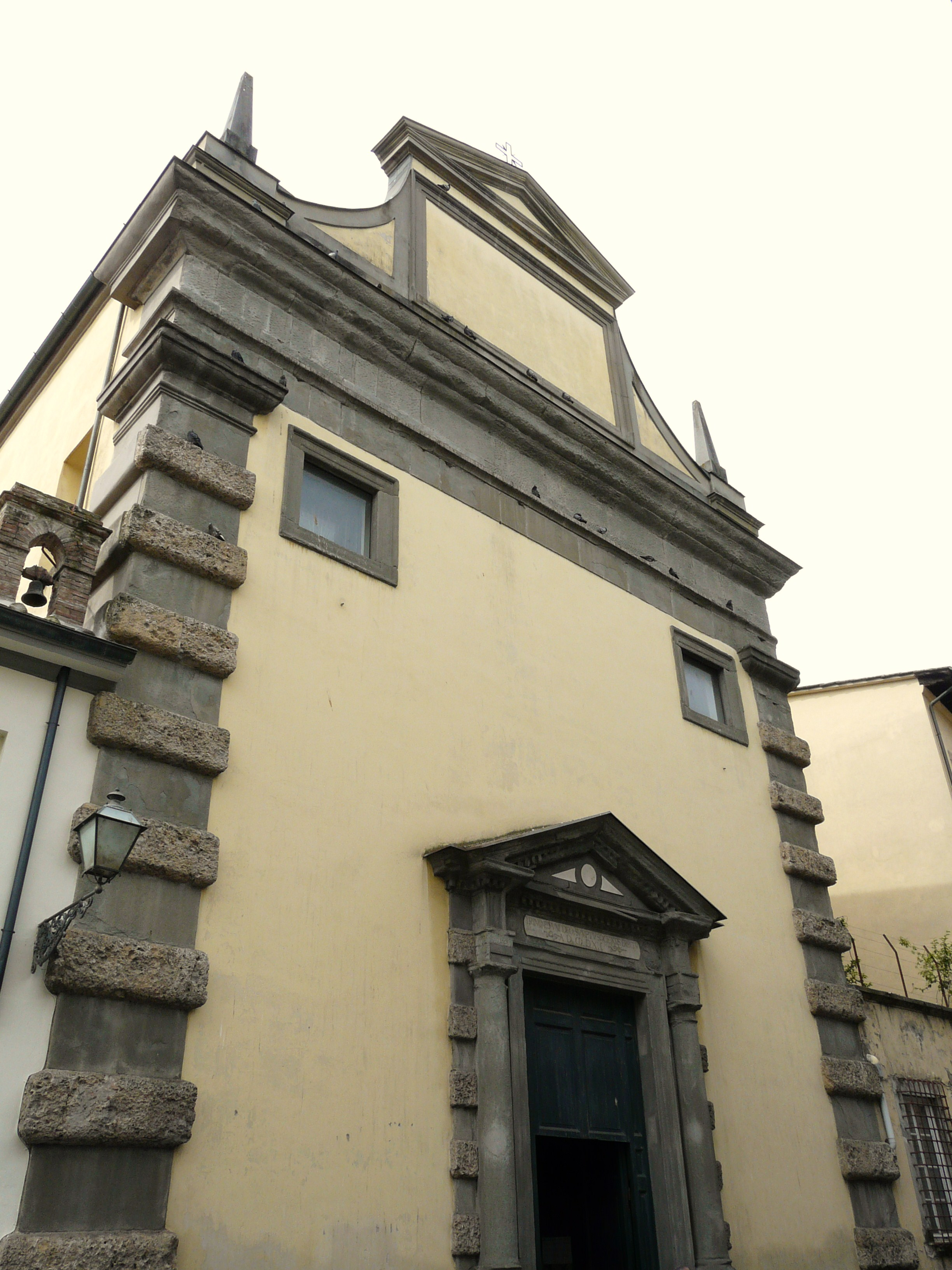
Facade of Santissima Trinità.

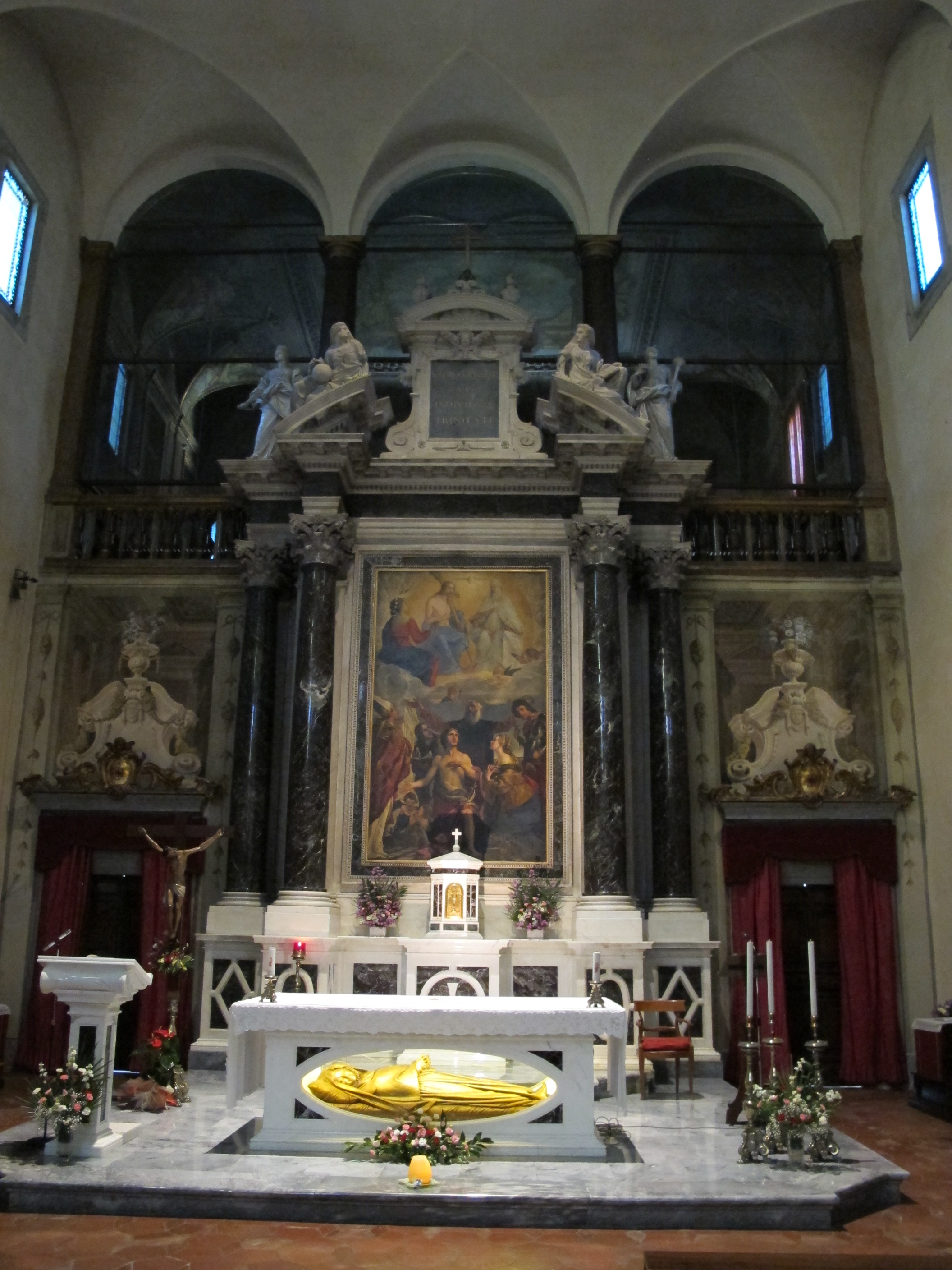
Main altar with Paolini altarpiece.

Santissima Trinità is a Renaissance-style, Roman Catholic church in via Elisa in central Lucca, region of Tuscany, Italy.

== History ==
The church was completed in 1595. It was once affiliated with the Barnabite order of nuns, with an adjacent hospital for the convalescent, and was later affiliated with a Salesian order.

== Art and architecture ==
The design, with a facade with rusticated pilasters and roof-top obelisks, is attributed to Bartolommeo Ammannati or his followers. The church has an elaborate main altar with polychrome marble, and painted architecture. The main altarpiece is the Trinity with Saints John the Baptist, Paolino, Sebastian, Antony, and Catherine by Pietro Paolini. A side altar has a sculpted marble Lactating Madonna (also called Madonna della Tosse or della Latte) by Matteo Civitali. The ceiling has a frescoed oval by Trinity (1595) by Pietro Sorri. Other works lateral to the main altar were completed by Domenico Brugieri circa 1721.

Under the main altar is a glass box with a gilded statue holding relics.
