= Giovanni Marracci =

Italian painter (1637–1704)

- Born: 1 October 1637; Camaiore
- Died: 1704; Lucca
- Known for: Painting
- Movement: Baroque

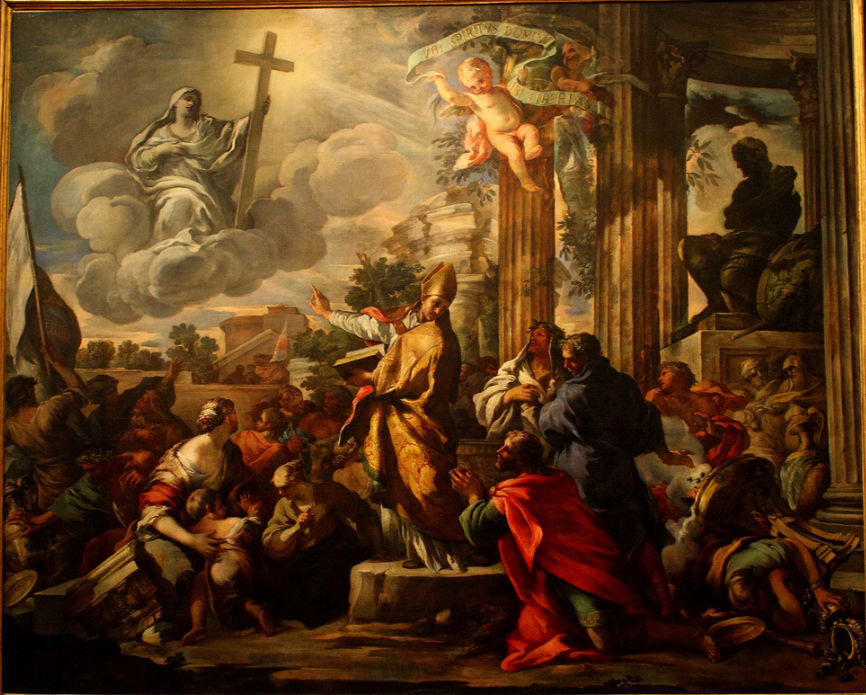
Bishop Saint Paolino destroying the idols

Giovanni Marracci (1637–1704) was an Italian Baroque painter who after training with Pietro da Cortona in Rome, worked in his home region of Lucca where he painted many altarpieces.

== Biography ==
Among his masterpieces are Madonna and Child with Saints in Pescaglia and Coronation of Santa Teresa (now in National Museum of Villa Guinigi in Lucca). He also frescoed the cupola of the chapel of Sant'Ignazio in the church of San Giovanni in Lucca. He painted a St Francis adoring the Virgin for the church of the Monastero dell'Angelo, and frescoed a Nativity for the main door of the interior of the church of San Giusto in Lucca. The frescoes on the main door of Santa Maria Corteorlandini in Lucca are also attributed to him. He painted the altarpiece of St Thomas of the Tribune church.

He painted seven large canvases for the library of San Giorgio Maggiore in Venice, and also painted for the Galleria Colonna in Rome.

One of his pupils was Gaetano Vetturali. His brother, Ippolito Marracci, painted quadratura.
