= Giuseppe Antonio Luchi =

Italian painter (1709–1774)

Giuseppe Antonio Luchi, also known as il Diecimino, (July 17, 1709 – May 12, 1774) was an Italian painter.

== Biography ==
He was born in Diecimo, now within Borgo a Mozzano, in the now Province of Lucca. He initially trained under a doctor Azzi of Castelnuovo, who was painting canvases for the Via Crucis of the local parish church. In 1725, he went to work in Lucca, first under Giorgio Cristoforo Martini, called il Sassone, then under Domenico Brugieri until 1729 In that year, he moved to Bologna to work under Donato Creti. In October 1751, he moved to Venice where he found the support of an inn owner, Angela Zangrandi, and the patronage of Alessandro Corner, which gained him access to the studio of Giovanni Battista Tiepolo. He mainly made stucco statues and copies of paintings. In 1738, he returned to Lucca, where he was patronized by the Doctor Tommaso Lippi, then settled in Lucca where he had pupils, including Bernardino Nocchi and Stefano Tofanelli. he worked in Lucca until 1769, when he returned to Diecimo for the last years of his life.

Among his best works are Elijah's Dream and the Angel for the convent of San Giovannetto; a Conversion of St Paul for signor Giacomo Parensi; and a Martyrdom of St Bartholemew for the Oratory of the casa Trenta at Montramito. He painted an Annunciation for the church of San Cristoforo; a St Joseph dedicating Jesus to God the Father for the church of San Pietro Maggiore; a Birth of the Virgin for the church of Santa Anna in Pisa; an Immaculate Conception with Saints Joseph, Bernard of Siena, Mary Magdalen, and Margaret of Cortona for the church of the Riformati Franciscans in Pontremoli; San Giusto and the Virgin Mary for the church of Partigliano; a Virgin and Child with Saints Joseph and Francis for the church of the Sisters of San Francesco Romana al Borgo; a Virgin of the Succor for the church of San Quirico in Moriano.
