= Stefano Tofanelli =

Italian painter (1752–1812)

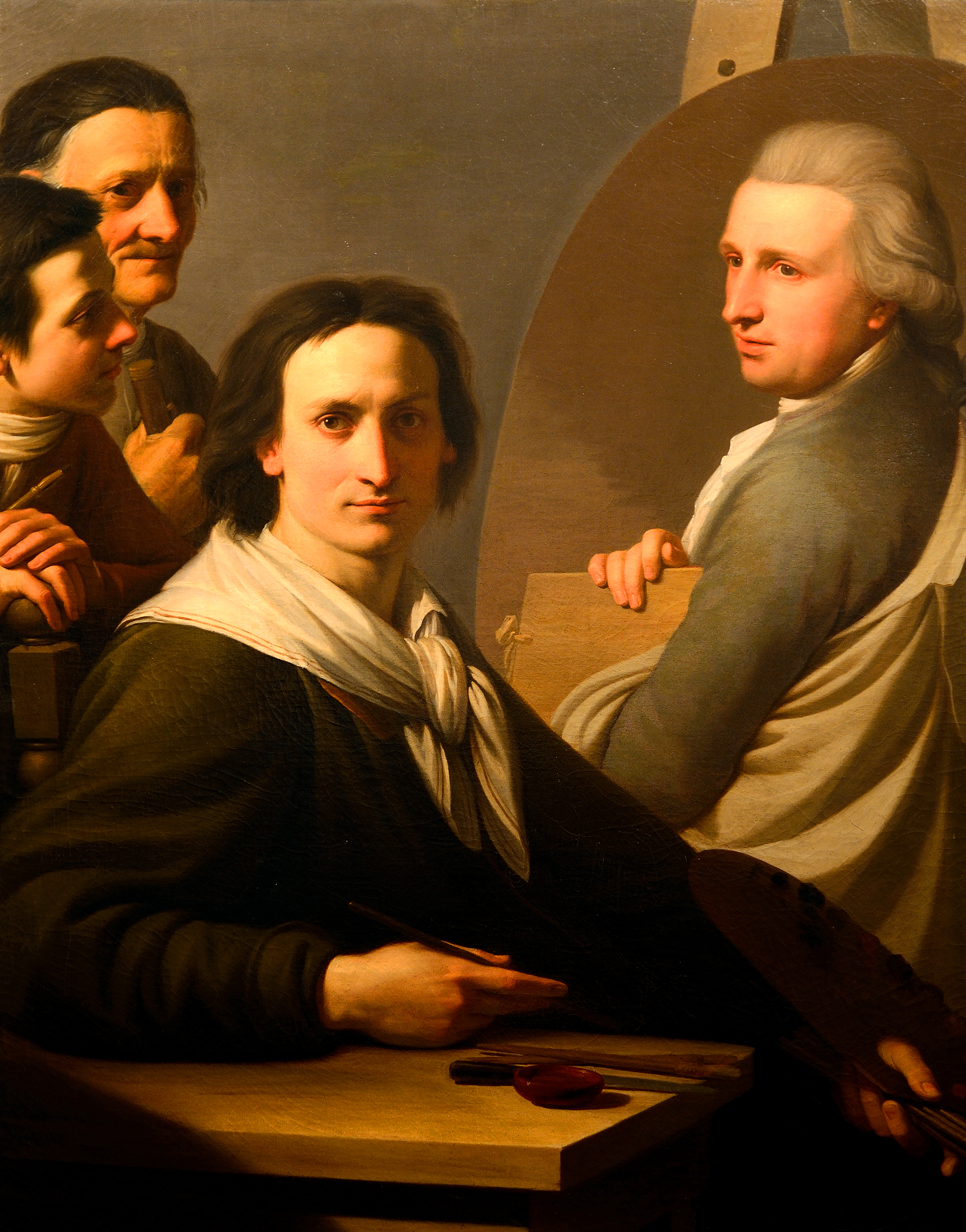
- Self portrait
- Born: 26 September 1752; Nave, Republic of Lucca
- Died: 30 October 1812 (aged 60); Rome, First French Empire
- Education: Giuseppe Antonio Luchi
- Known for: Painting
- Movement: Neoclassicism

Stefano Tofanelli (September 26, 1752 – November 30, 1812) was an Italian painter during the Neoclassic period.

== Life ==
=== Early life and education ===
He was born in Nave, near Lucca, and as a young boy of ten he was apprenticed with the painter Giuseppe Antonio Luchi, also called Il Diecimino, who was a follower of the rococo style of Giovanni Battista Tiepolo. With his fellow apprentice Bernardino Nocchi, then moved to Rome in 1768, where they both worked with Niccolò Lapiccola. In Rome with Nocchi he painted frescoes for the Palazzo of the Cardinal Dropanni. Under the supervision of Lapiccola Tofanelli took part in the restoration (1772) of Pope Julius II’s villa and the decoration of the Palazzo Vidoni-Caffarelli (from 1773), both in Rome.

=== Early career ===
His talent as a draughtsman quickly attracted attention: he was sought after by the engravers Giovanni Volpato and Raphael Morghen to make copies of works by Old Masters, and in 1781 he set up a school of drawing. For Volpato, he drew Parnassus by Raphael and a Sibyl and two Prophets by Michelangelo, Martyrdom by Guido Reni, Aurora and Day & Night by Guercino, and a Landscape by Claude Lorrain. For Morghen, he completed a drawing of Poussin's Dance of the Hours, of Raphael's Jurisprudence, Transfiguration, and Miracle of Bolsena; and of Murillo's Magdalene. He also worked for Bettelini, Fontana, and Giovanni Folo.

=== Mature work ===
Tofanelli was one of the best Neoclassical portrait painters and in Rome he produced such examples as Count Alessandro Castracane (1781; Providence, Rhode Island School of Design Museum) and Christopher Hewetson Sculpting the Bust of Gavin Hamilton (c. 1784; Cologne, Wallraf–Richartz Museum). He also painted a Self-portrait (1783; Rome, Palazzo Braschi), showing him with his father and brother Agostino Tofanelli, who was also a painter. However, he achieved fame as a result of his decoration (1784–92) of the Villa Mansi at Segromigno in Monte, near Capannori, for which he even designed furniture and paving. The seven canvases depicting the myth of Apollo were sent from Rome, but in 1786 the artist went there himself to paint the tempera frescoes. He took advantage of the trip to visit Venice and Parma, where he discovered the work of Correggio. His reputation was formally recognized by his election in 1791 to the Accademia di San Luca in Rome and the commission of 1792 for an Apotheosis of Romulus to decorate a ceiling in the Palazzo Altieri, Rome. From the early 1790s Tofanelli also began to produce religious works. In addition to the frescoes (1794) in the church of Sant'Antonio at Tivoli, he painted altarpieces that were sent from Rome to various Italian towns, including three large canvases for the Benedictine church of San Nicolò dell’Arena at Catania: Beheading of Saint John the Baptist, Adoration of the Shepherds and Saint Nicholas of Bari Freeing a Slave (all 1794).

=== Court painter in Lucca ===
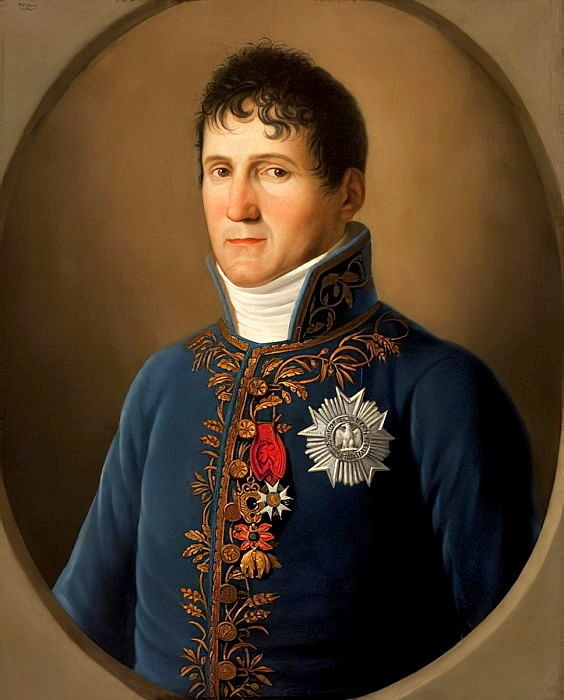
Portrait of Felix Baciocchi, oil on canvas, Lucca, Palazzo Orsetti

Political and economic difficulties obliged Tofanelli to return to his home town in 1801, and in 1802 he was appointed as a teacher at the school of drawing in Lucca. Among his pupils was Michele Ridolfi. In 1805 Tofanelli became a member of the Accademia Napoleone and was granted the titles of Senator, and First Painter to the Princess of Lucca and Piombino, Elisa Bonaparte. His activity intensified, though he concentrated on works for Lucca and its environs, including an altarpiece of the Assumption (1808) for Lucca Cathedral and murals (1811) for the chapel of the Holy Sacrament in the same cathedral.

A period of prosperity brought a great demand for the decoration of buildings in Lucca. Tofanelli painted overdoors in tempera in several rooms of the Palazzo Pubblico (now Palazzo Provinciale) in Lucca, and elsewhere. At Princess Elisa's villa (the Villa Reale) at Marlia he left the decoration, Dance of the Hours, unfinished at his death, and this was completed by the French artist Jean-Baptiste Frédéric Desmarais. He continued to be much in demand as a portrait painter, producing portraits of such important figures as Elisa Baciocchi and her Husband Felice (1805; versions Lucca, Palazzo Orsetti; Paris, Musée Marmottan Monet).

Several portraits have been destroyed or lost, such as Princess Napoleone Elisa (1812), known from a print by Tofanelli's nephew, the engraver Andrea Tofanelli. Tofanelli also continued to work as a draughtsman for engraving and sculpture projects. He gave unrestrained support to Napoleon by designing a statue for the Great Council Room of the Palazzo Pubblico, a work executed in 1804 by Giuseppe Martini. He also designed other statues in 1807 for the Piazza Napoleone in Lucca, and Cesare Lucchesini’s oration at Tofanelli’s funeral referred to other and diverse works of sculpture: a wax Christ and a model (Turin, Museo Civico d'Arte Antica) for a statuette of Pope Pius VI, made for the porcelain factory of Giovanni Volpato. Toffanelli died in Lucca on November 30, 1812, aged 60.

=== Legacy ===
Following in the wake of Pompeo Girolamo Batoni, Tofanelli was one of the most accomplished of the Lucca school of painters who went to Rome to find success, but the finesse and precision of his drawing and the excellence of his technique are betrayed by his lack of feeling.

== Gallery ==
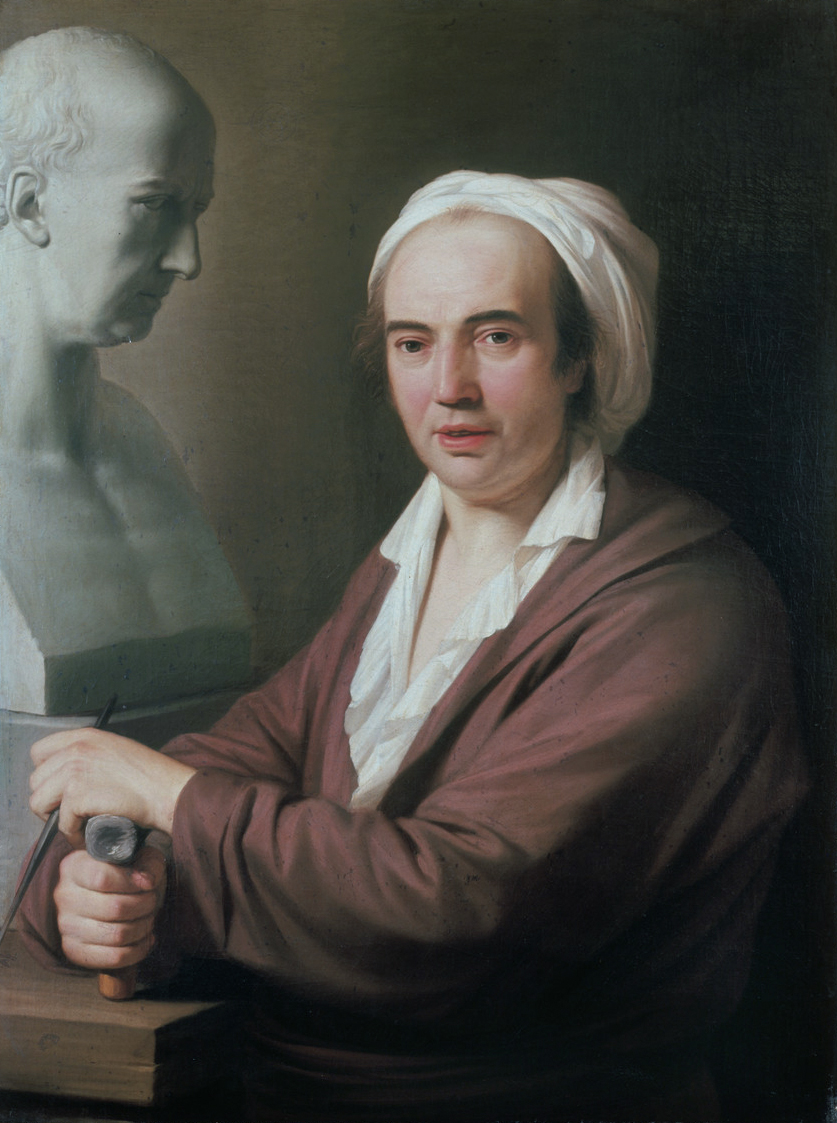
Portrait of the sculptor Christopher Hewetson, oil on canvas, Wallraf–Richartz Museum, Cologne

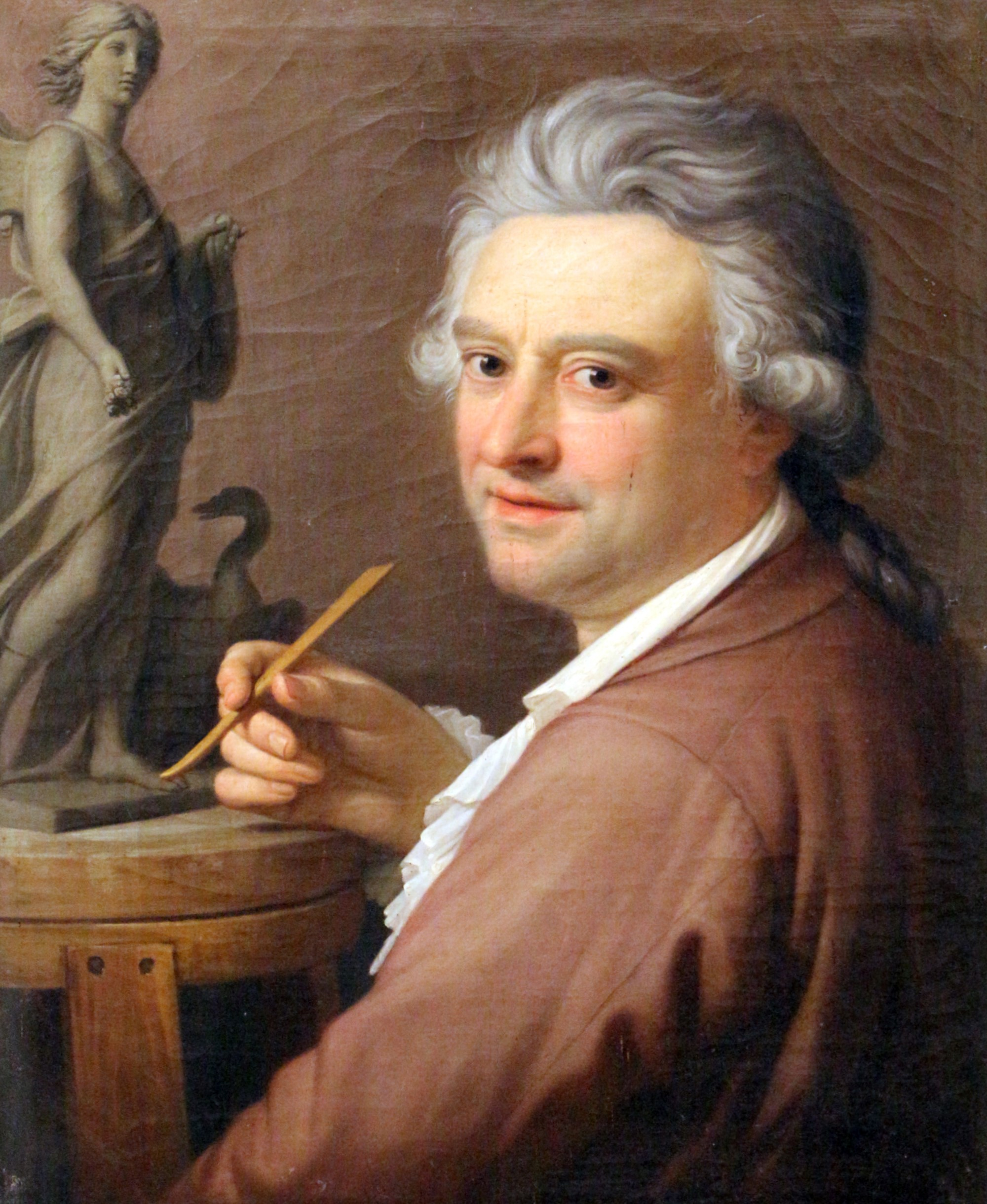
Portrait of the sculptor Carlo Albacini, oil on canvas, Accademia di San Luca, Rome

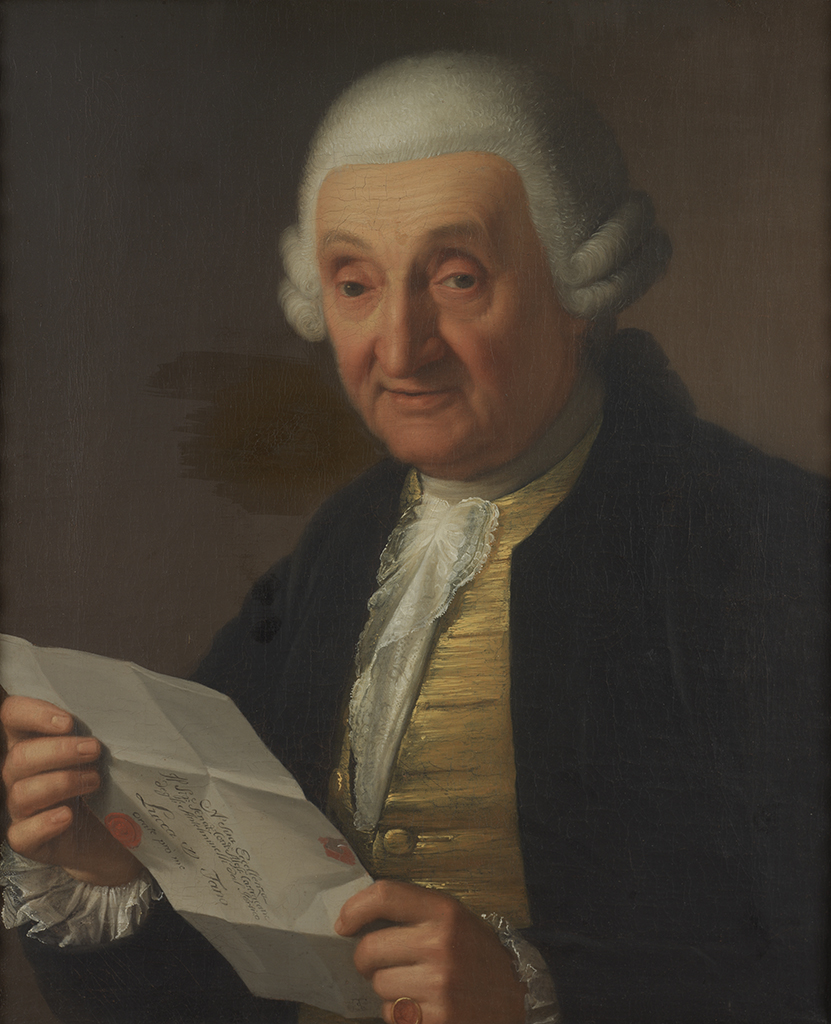
Portrait of Count Alessandro Castracane of Lucca, oil on canvas, Rhode Island School of Design Museum

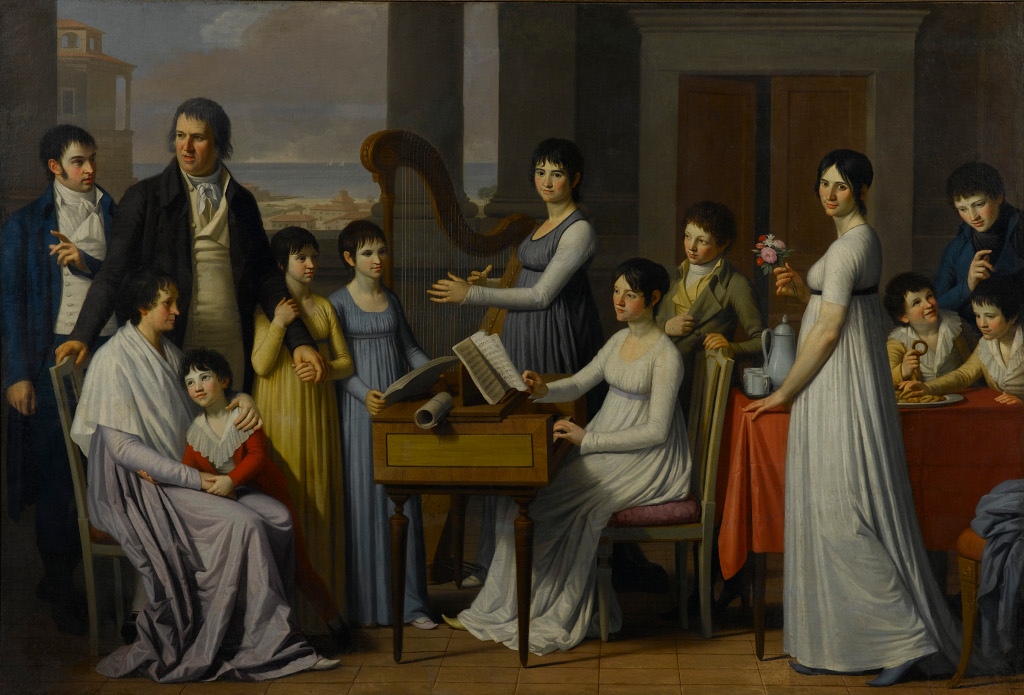
Portrait of the Belluomini family, oil on canvas, Chilean National Museum of Fine Arts, Santiago

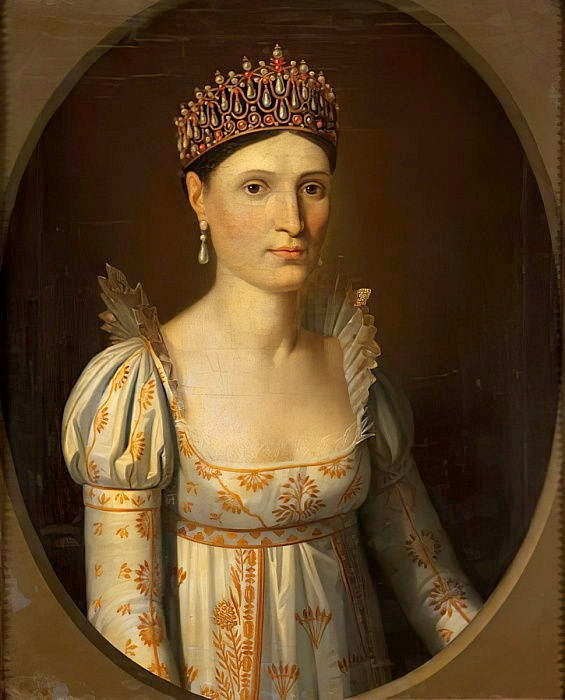
Portrait of Elisa Bonaparte, oil on canvas, Lucca, Palazzo Orsetti
