= Niccolò Lapiccola =

Italian painter

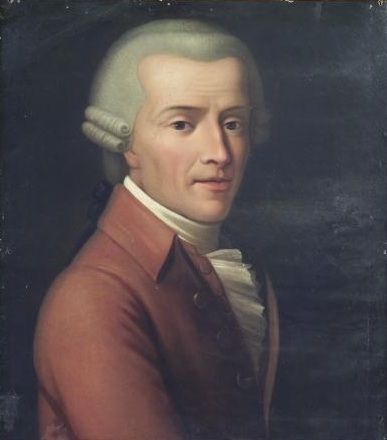

Niccolò Lapiccola (7 February 1727 – 3 February 1790) was an Italian painter. He was born in Crotone and took lessons at Rome from Francesco Mancini. He supplied the designs for the mosaics for one of the chapels of St. Peter's Basilica. One of his pupils is the engraver Stefano Tofanelli and Bernardino Nocchi. He later became an academician in 1766 and later honorary member of Accademia di San Luca. He died in Rome.

His other paintings included Life of Psyche, Stigmata of St. Francis (San Lorenzo in Panisperna) and decoration of the golden hall with mythological scenes at Palazzo Chigi, Rome.
