= Bernardino Nocchi =

Italian painter (1741–1812)

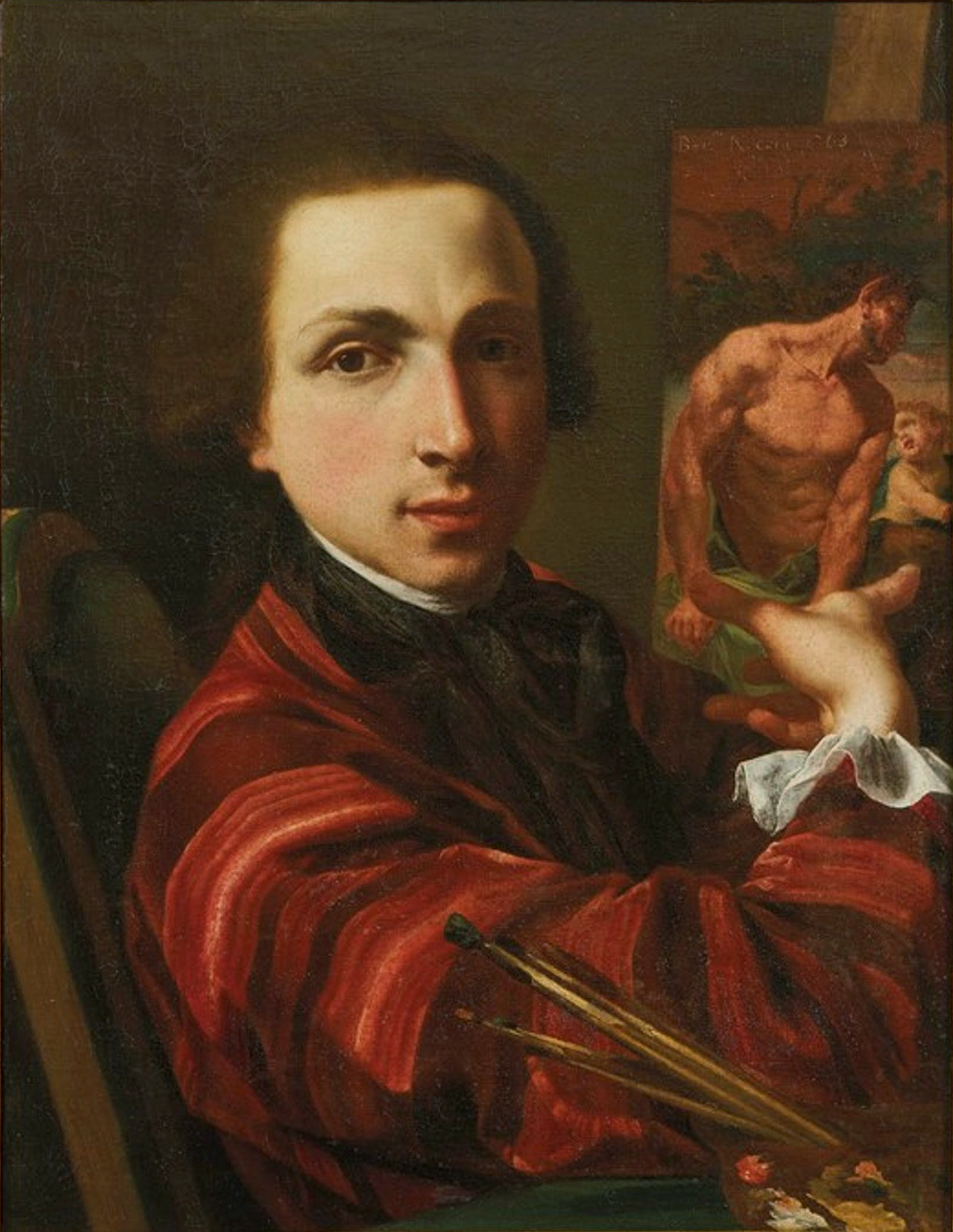
- Self portrait
- Born: 8 May 1741; Lucca, Republic of Lucca
- Died: 27 January 1812 (aged 70); Rome, First French Empire
- Known for: Painting
- Movement: Neoclassicism

Bernardino or Giovanni Bernardino Nocchi (May 8, 1741 – January 27, 1812) was an Italian painter, mainly of sacred and historic subjects.

== Biography ==
=== Early life and education ===
He was born in Lucca and trained there under Giuseppe Antonio Luchi until 1767. By 1769, Nocchi and his contemporary Stefano Tofanelli had moved to Rome, where they entered the studio of Niccolò Lapiccola.

=== Career ===
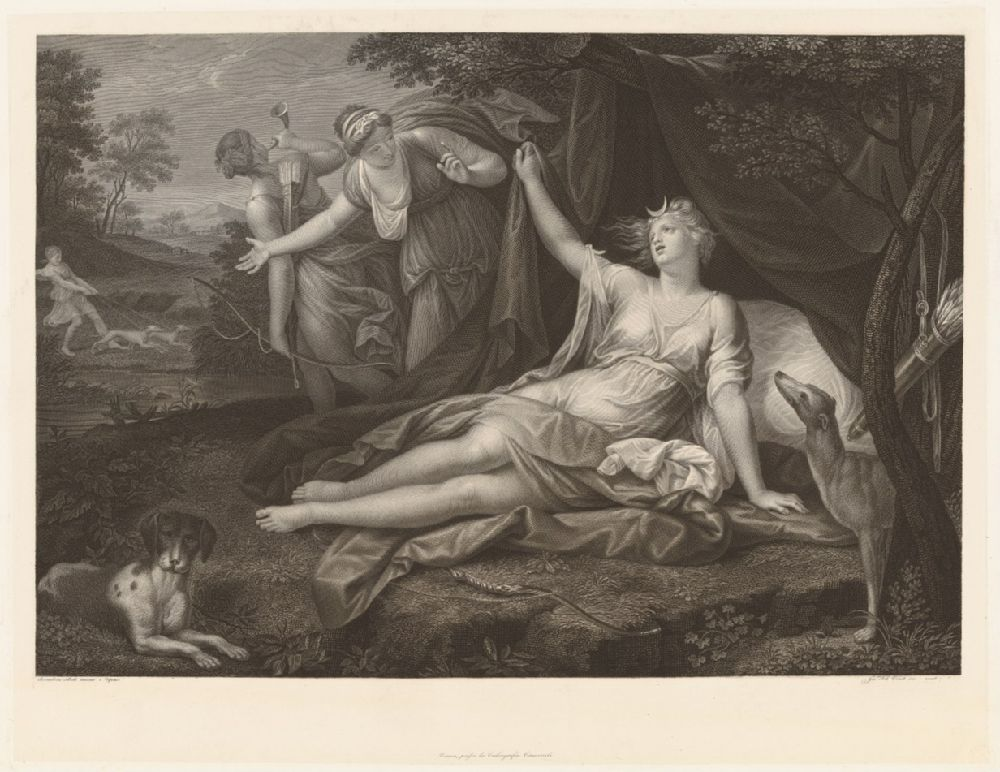
Giovanni Folo after Bernardino Nocchi, "Diana Woken by Nymphs," 1800–1836, engraving and etching, Department of Image Collections, National Gallery of Art Library, Washington, DC

In 1780, he helped decorate the Apostolic palace and in 1785 the Stanza delle Stampe of the Vatican Library. In 1797, he painted the Transit of St Joseph for the church of San Secondo in Gubbio; in 1804, he completes the Death of St Anne for the Basilica di San Frediano in Spoleto. Returning to Rome, Nocchi painted in 1799 a portrait of Prince Camillo Borghese; in 1803, Glory of Santa Pudenziana (for the church of the same name), San Novato, and San Timoteo. In 1807 he painted a portrait of Pope Pius VII. He also painted The Dancers, Portrait of a Noble Lady and Portrait of the Venerable Marie Clotilde of France, queen of Sardinia (1809). His son, Pietro Nocchi, was also a painter.

Nocchi’s notable portraits include those of Camillo Borghese, 6th Prince of Sulmona (c. 1799; Turin, Galleria Sabauda) and Pius VII ( 1807; Pinacoteca Comunale di Cesena).

== Gallery ==
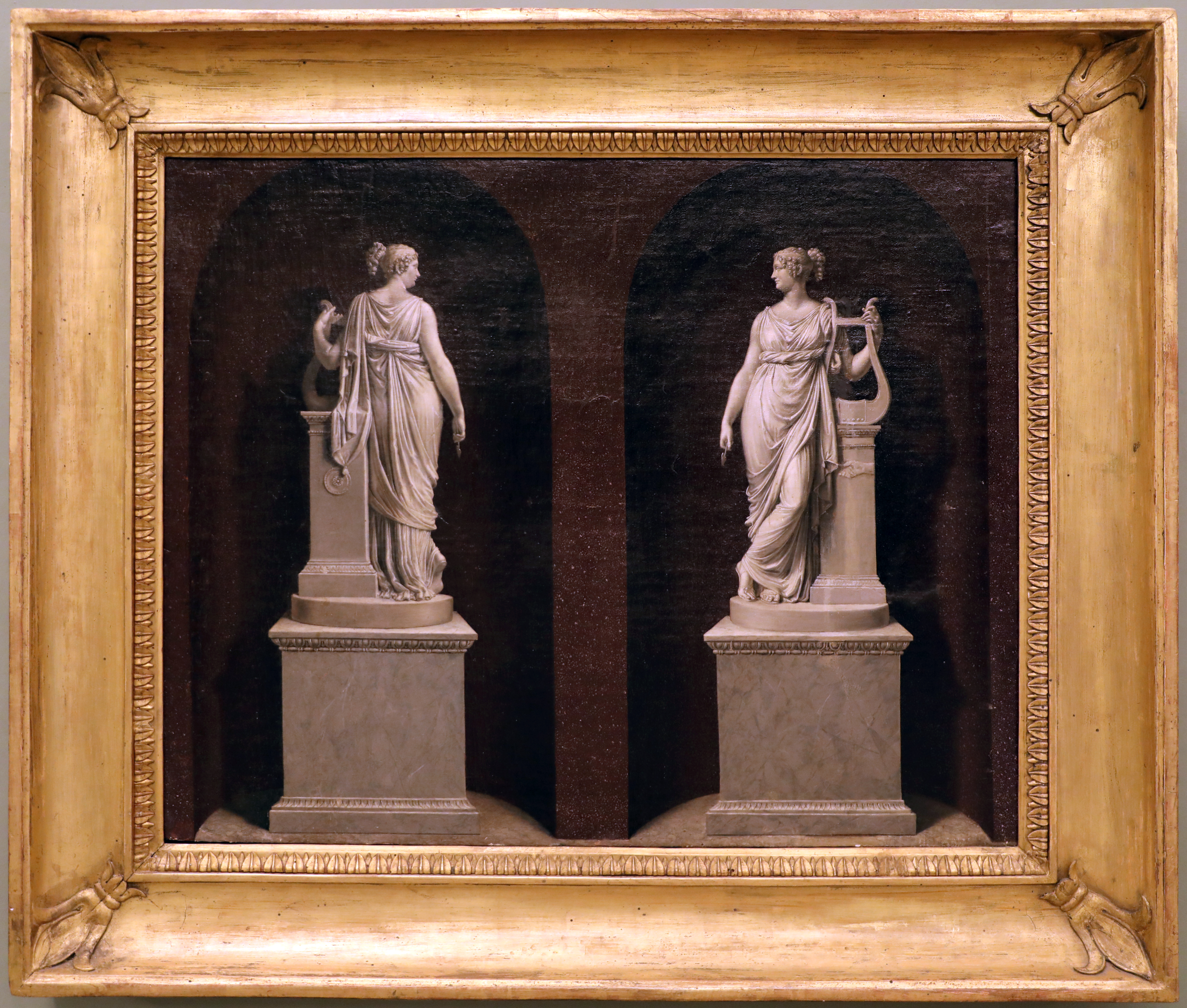
Alexandrine de Bleschamps come Tersicore, oil on canvas, priv. col.

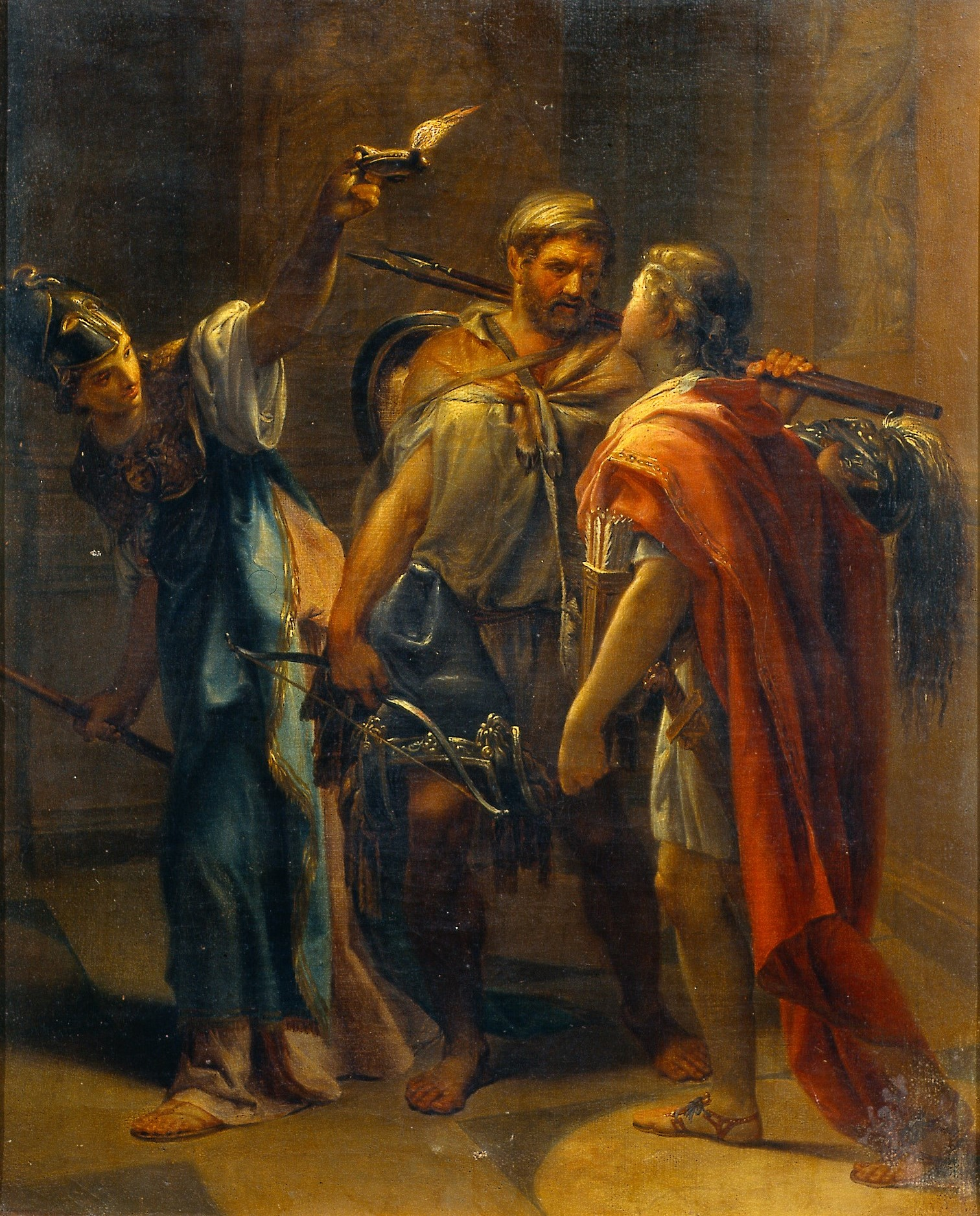
Il ritorno di Ulisse a Itaca, oil on canvas, Museo Civico di Modena

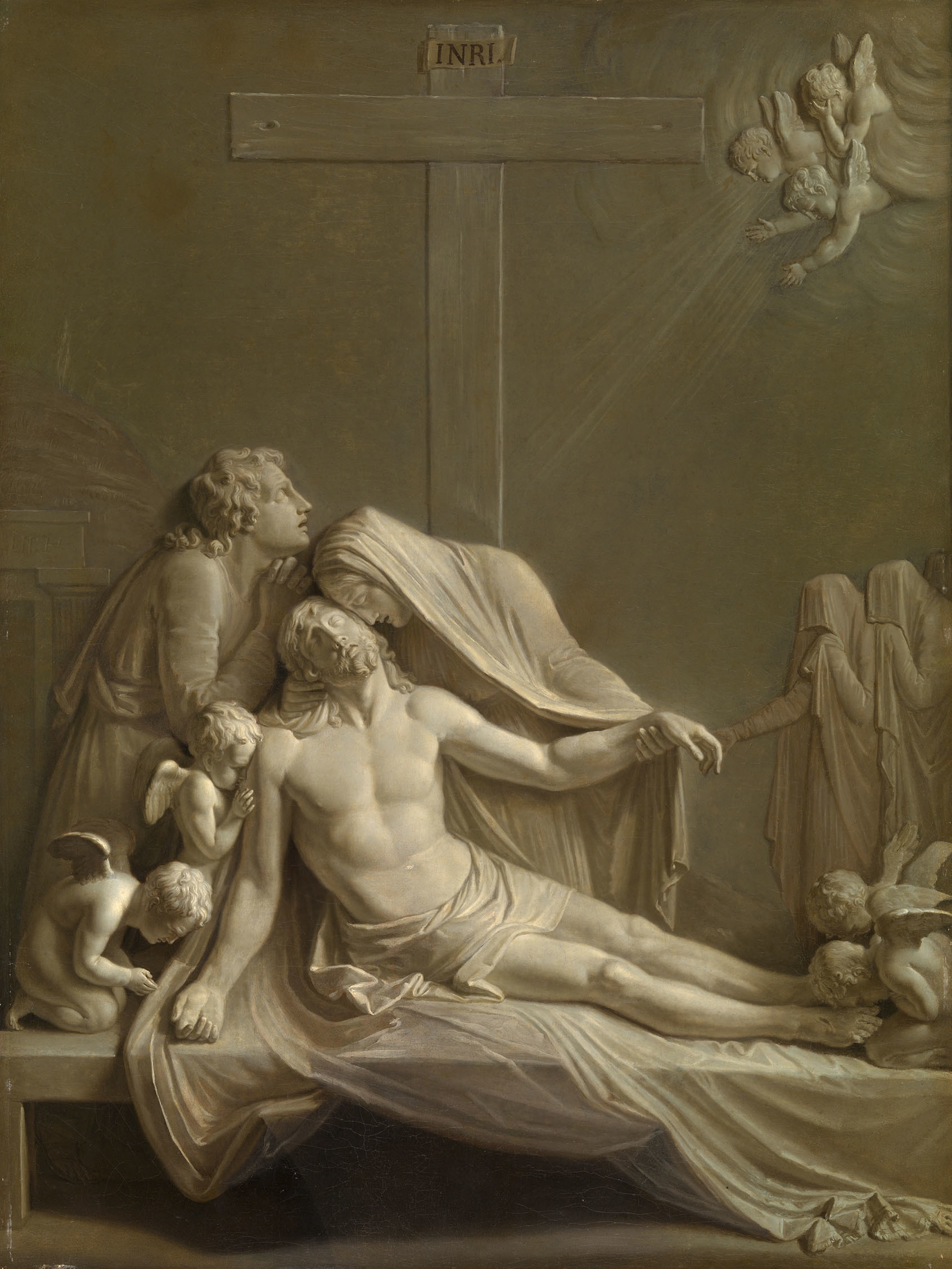
Deposizione, oil on canvas, Art Institute of Chicago

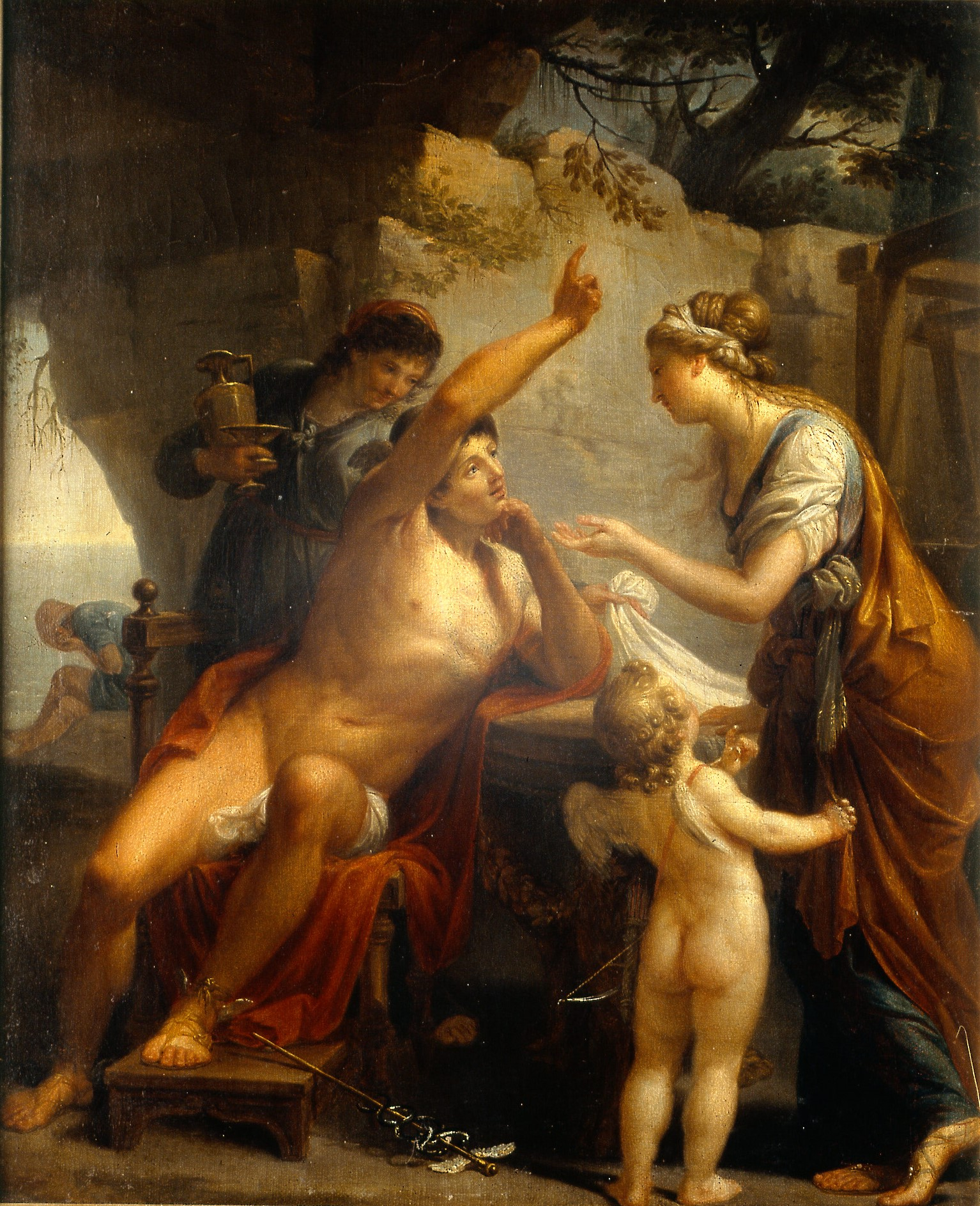
Il pianto di Ulisse, oil on canvas, Museo Civico di Modena

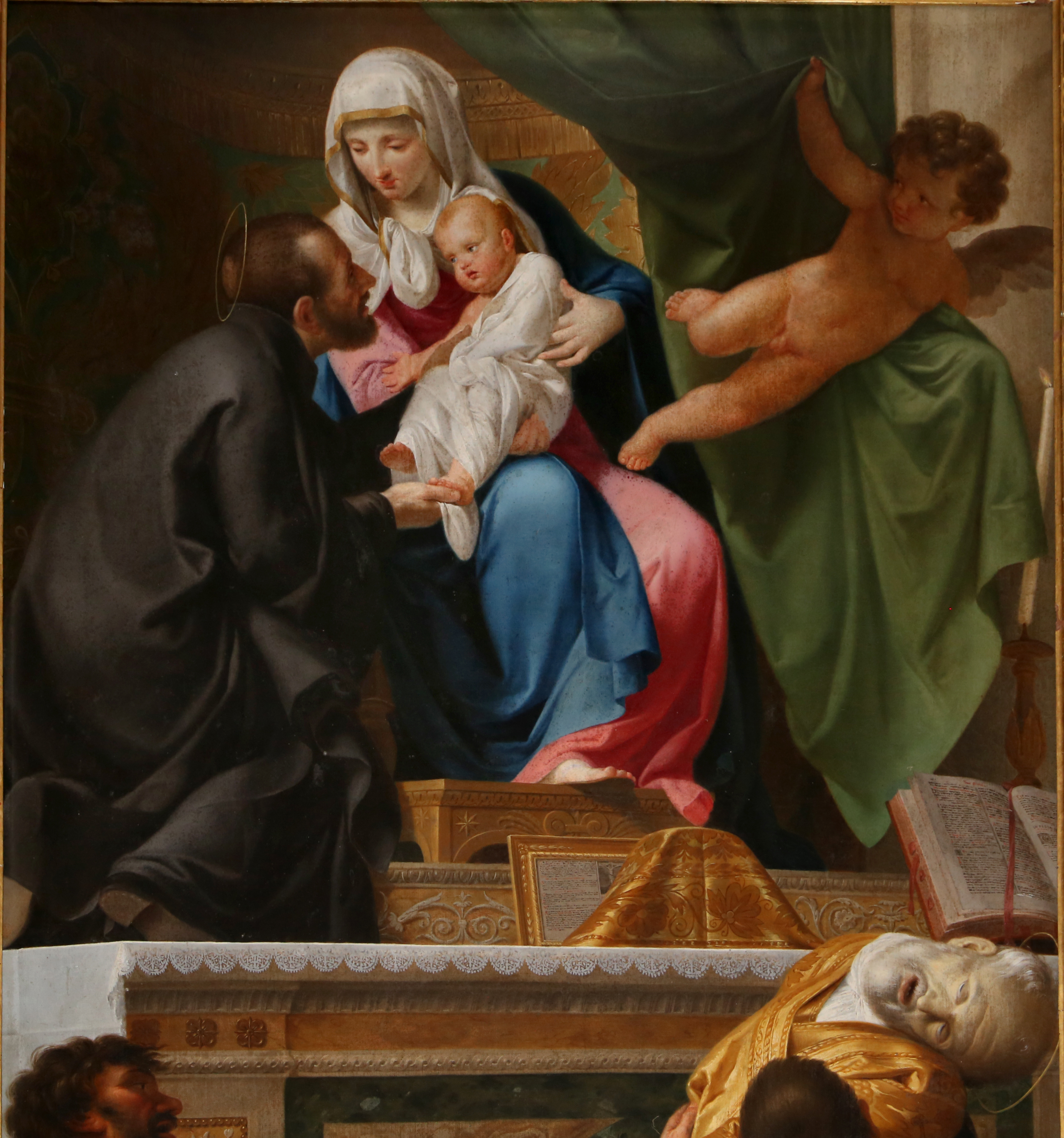
Morte d Sant'Andrea Avellino, Spoleto Cathedral

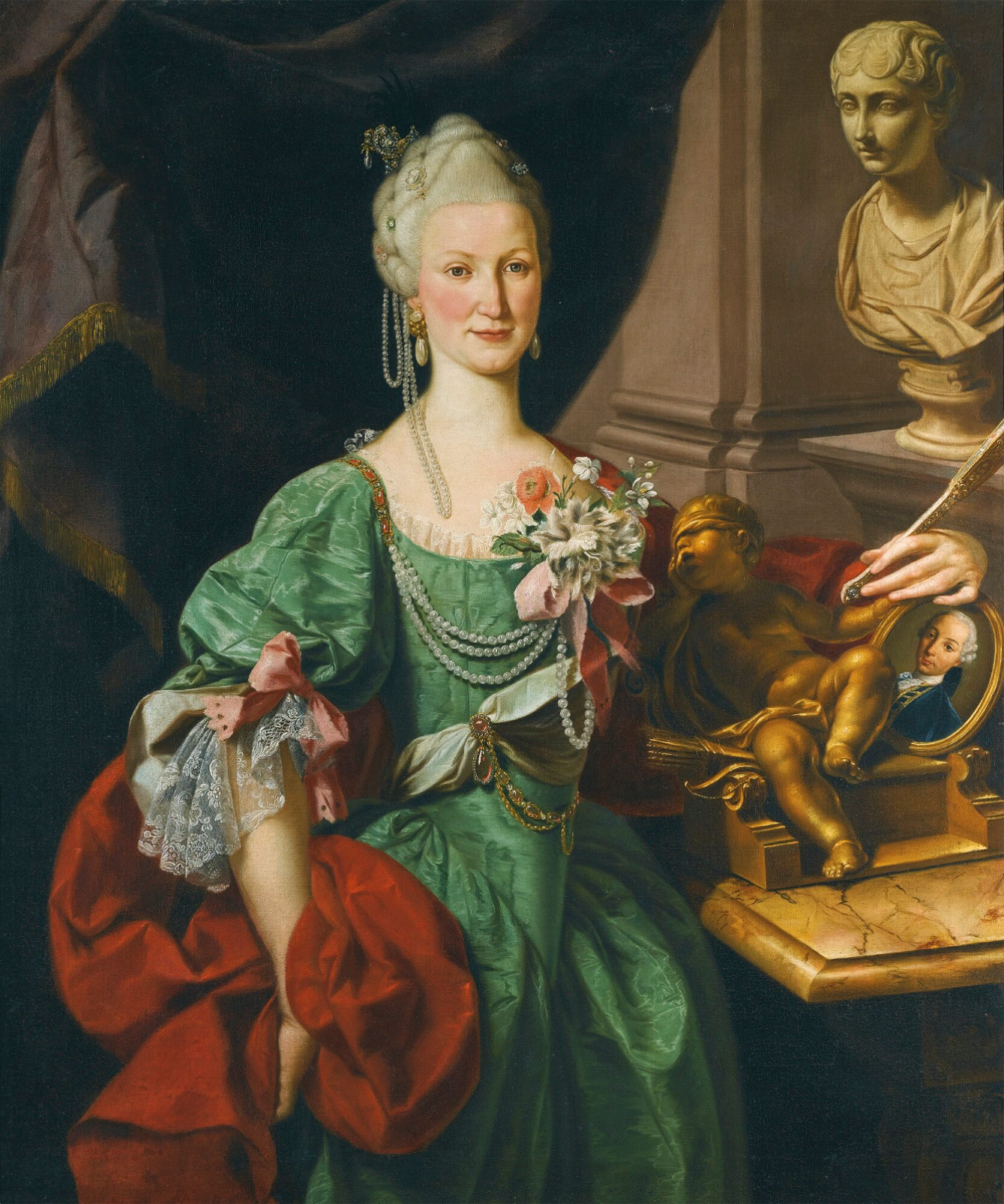
Portrait of a Noblewoman, oil on canvas, Collezione Bevilacqua, Cittadella

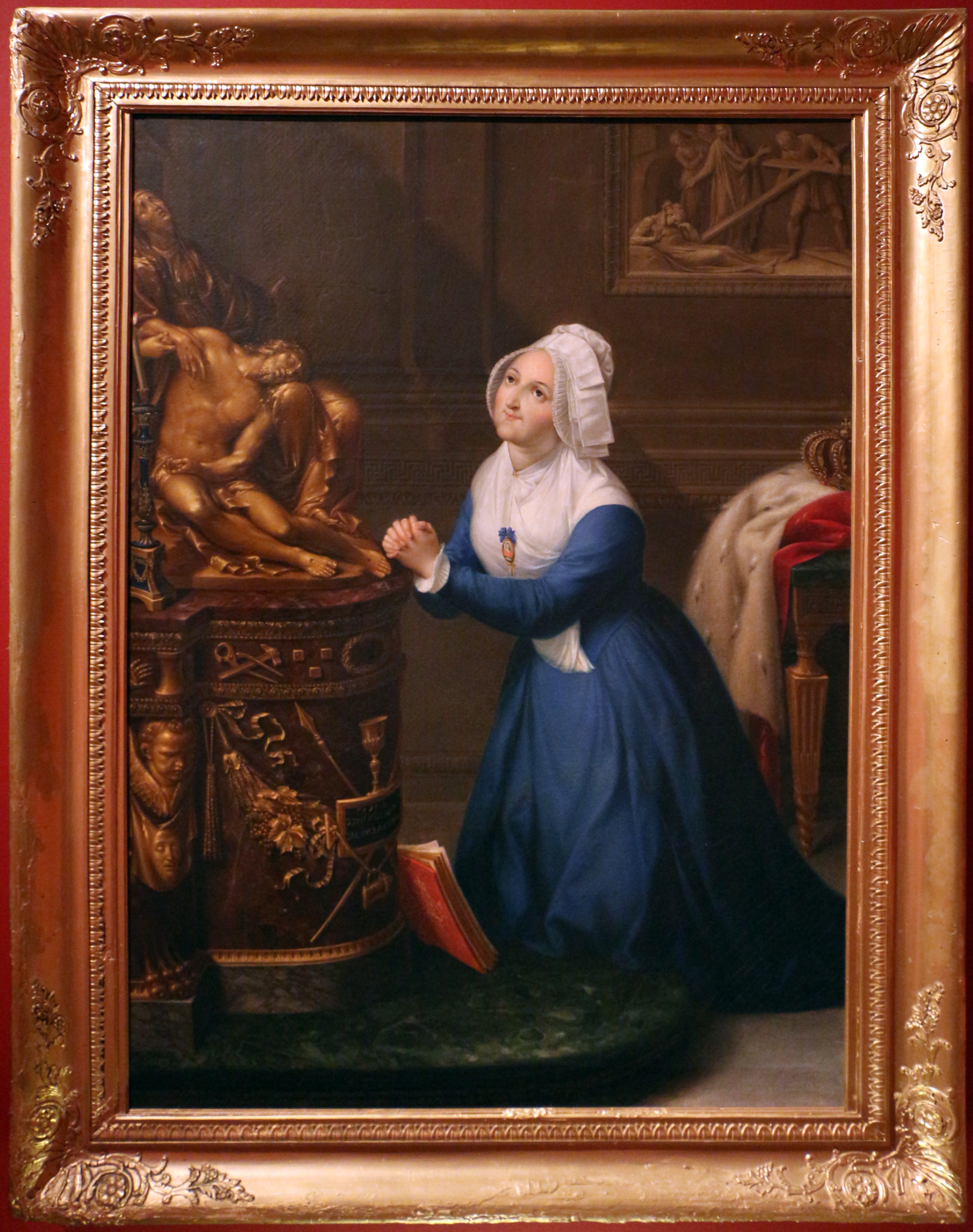
Ritratto della venerabile Maria Clotilde di Borbone, regina di Sardegna, oil on canvas, Cavallini-Sgarbi Col.

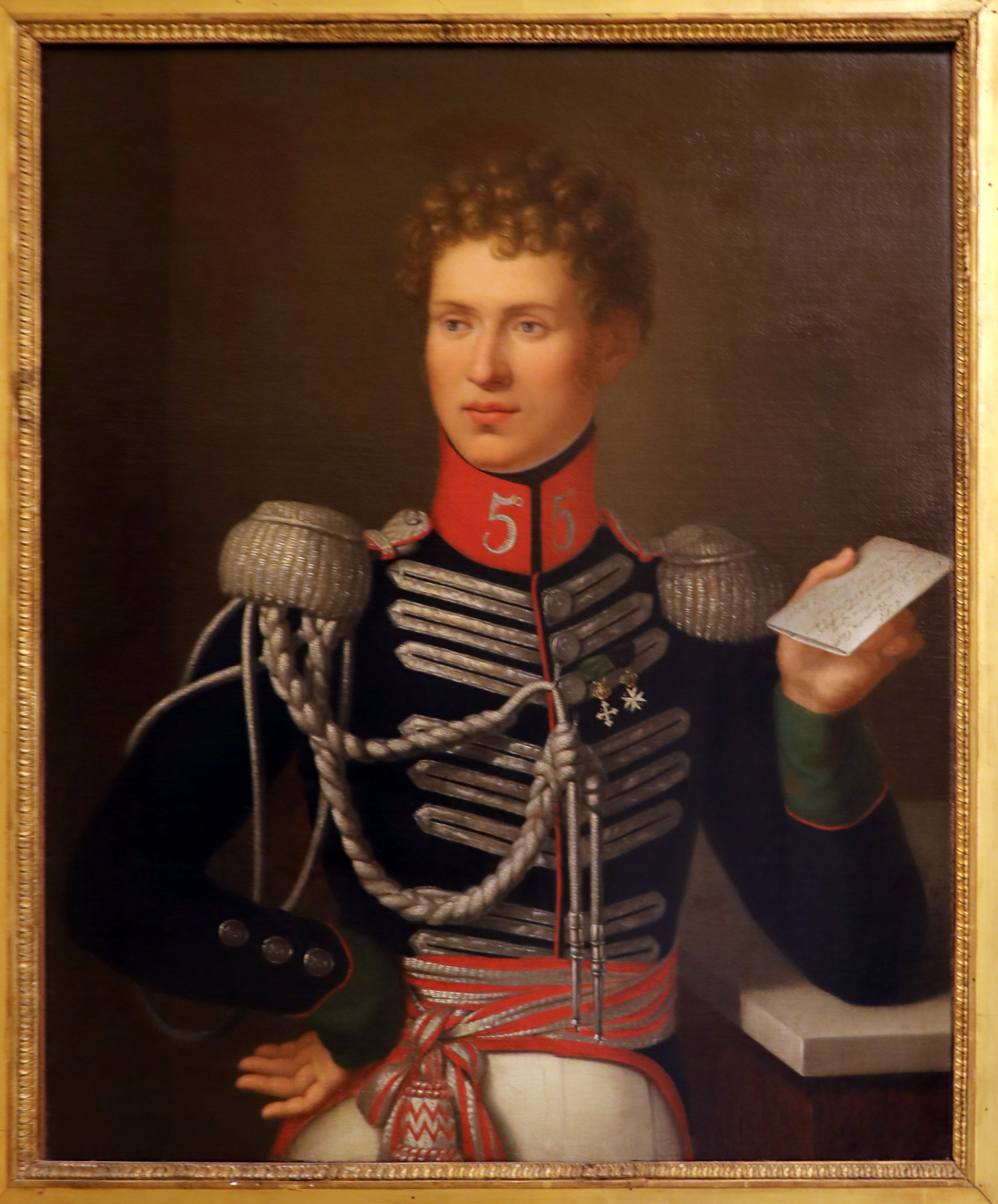
Ritratto del conte Bernardino Orsetti, oilmon canvas, priv. col.
