= San Giusto, Lucca =

Church building in Lucca, Italy

Coordinates: 43°50′31.12″N 10°30′13.24″E

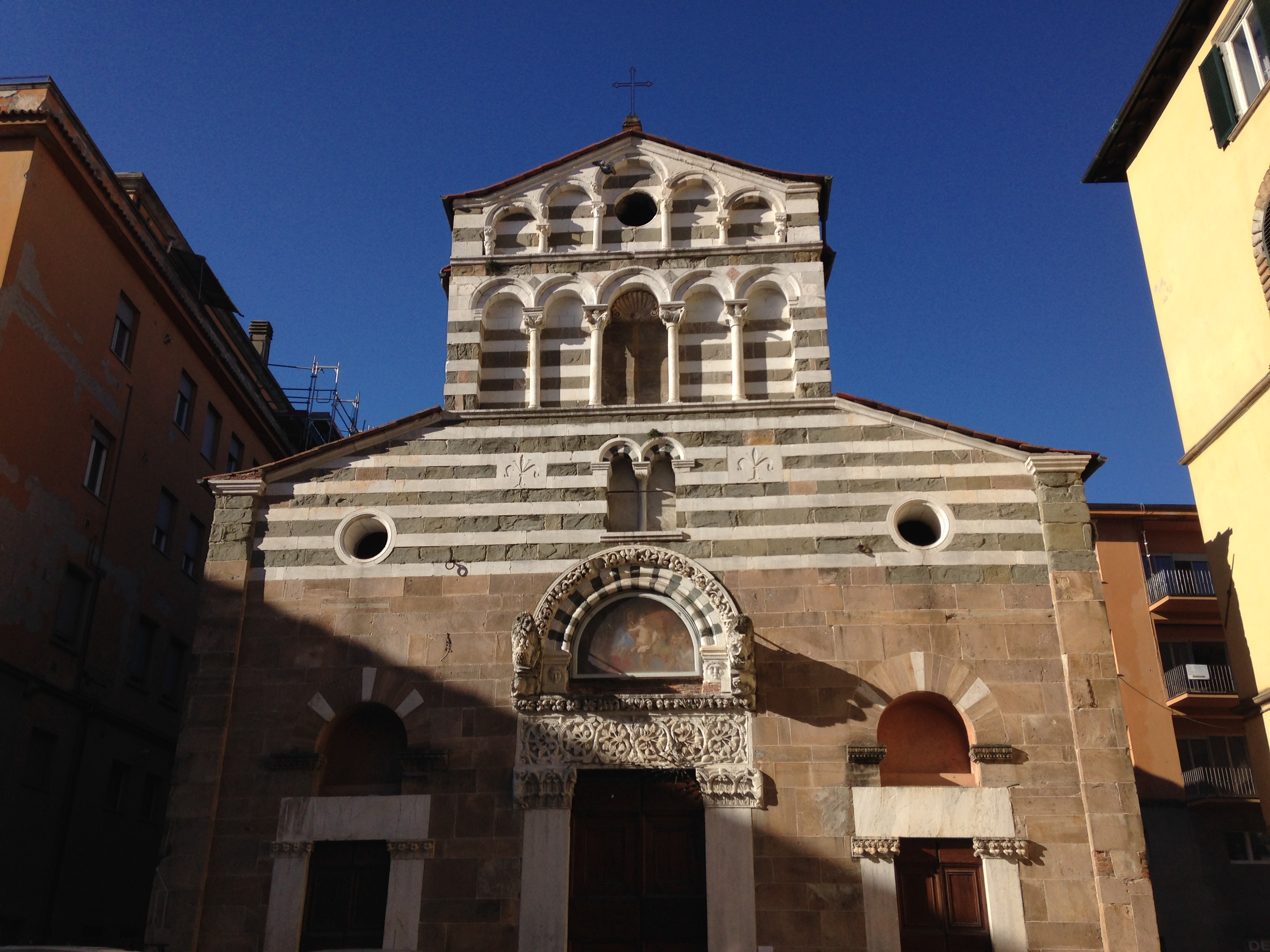

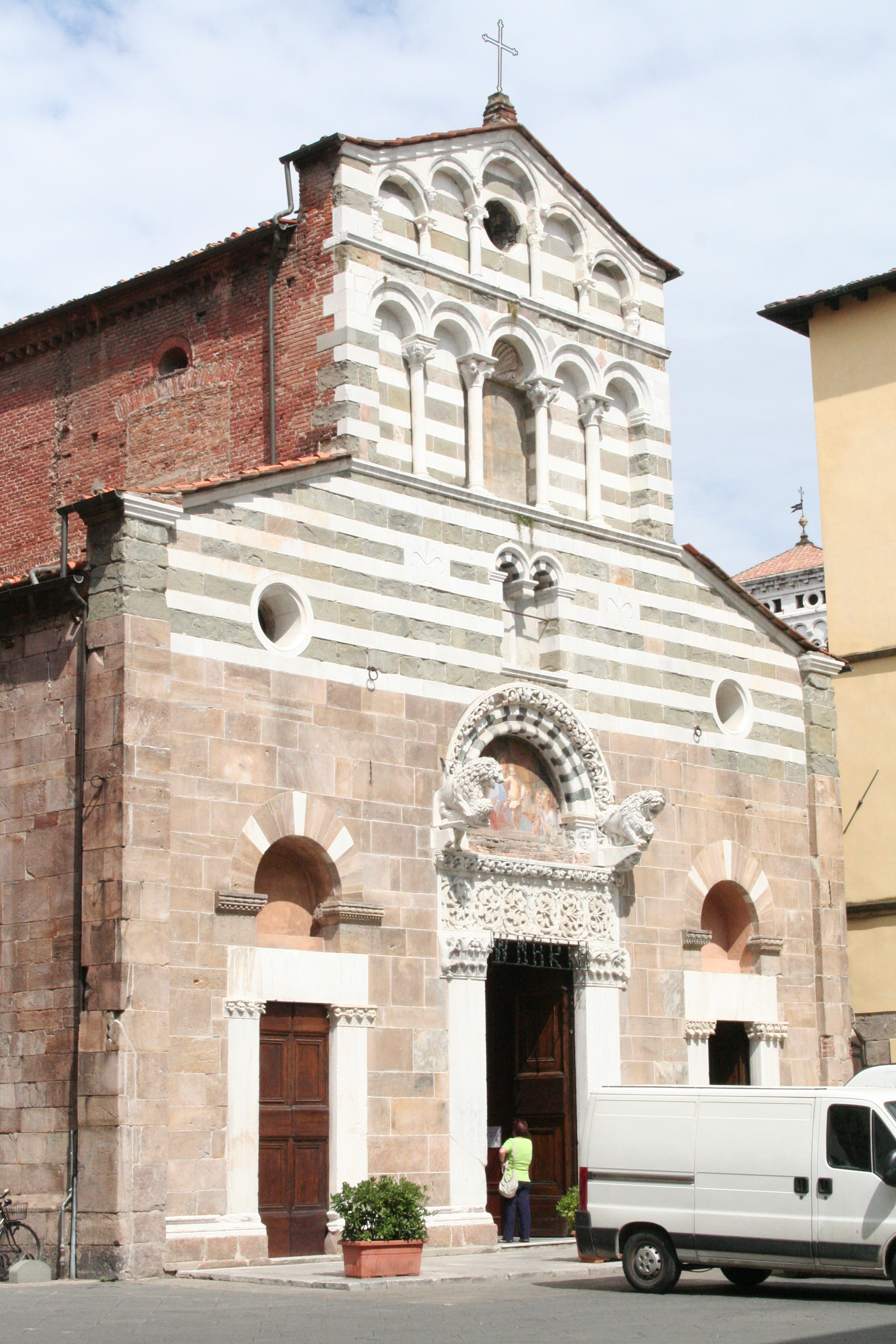
Church of San Giusto.

San Giusto is a church in Lucca, Tuscany, central Italy. Built over a pre-existing church, it dates to the second half of the 12th century. Its titular is the 12th century Italian, Giustino Salce, whence the name "San Giusto".

== Description ==
The present building has a nave and two aisles with apses. The façade has a mixed decoration, with white and black stripes in the upper part, forming two small superimposed loggias at the top.

The central portal was made by Guidetto's workshop, and, among the other details, includes two twisting atlases (one now partly missing) supporting two protruding lions at the sides of the lunette. The rest of the decoration has vegetable motifs or fantastic creatures. The two roots of the internal archivolt (which has black and white rows like in the upper façade) lay on two cubes with masks of Classic origin.

The side portals have less ornate decorations, mostly limited to the capitals and similar to that of the central one. The latter is surmounted by a double mullioned window, while above the side ones are simpler oculi. The apse's exteriors features Lombard bands and two orders of single mullioned windows. The interior was remade during the 17th century in Baroque style.
