= Art collection of Fondazione Cassa di Risparmio di Lucca =

Bank art collection

Coordinates: 43°50′32.8″N 10°30′38.97″E

The art collection of the Foundation of Lucca Saving Bank (in Italian Fondazione Cassa di Risparmio di Lucca) is a collection of artworks, mostly created by artists from Lucca, acquired by this financial institution (the bank became two entity in 1990s, SpA and Bank Foundation). The home of the Foundation is the former Monastery and church of San Micheletto in Lucca. Though artworks of many periods are present in the collection, the Baroque paintings and the items linked to the cult of the Holy Face of Lucca are especially of note.

== Partial inventory of the collection ==
Label	Painter	Span	Work	Date	Link
1	Vincenzo Barsotti		Urban plaza ceremony with baldachinno		
2	Pompeo Batoni	1708-1787	Sketch in profile of Nobleman		
3	Pompeo Batoni	1708-1787	Burial of Christ	1761	
4	Paolo Biancucci	1596-1650	The adoration of the Cross		
	Giovanni Francesco Chelucci	1712-1729	Statue of St. Francis of Assisi (silver)		
5	Matteo Civitali	1436-1501	Passion of Christ (bust in terracotta)		
6	Ezechia (Zacchia)	1490-	Madonna with Child and St. Joseph		
7	Giovanni Domenico Lombardi	1682-1751	Adoration by the shepherds		
8	Giovanni Domenico Lombardi	1682-1751	The fortune teller		
9	Giuseppe Luchi (il Diecimino)		Madonna mourning over body of Christ		
10	Pietro Paolini (attributed)	1603-1681	Musical banquet		
11	Pietro Paolini	1603-1681	Adoration by the Shepherds	1640	
12	Pietro Ricchi	1606-1675	Allegory of Astronomy		
13	Pietro Ricchi	1606-1675	Cleopatra		
14	Girolamo Scaglia	1620s-1686	Allegory of the end of life and terrestrial power		
15	Unknown		Madonna & Bambino; Saints Michael Archangel & Clare; angels; and monks	1600	
16	Giovanni Vambré il Vecchio		Statue of Madonna del Soccorso (silver)	1690	
17	Gaetano Vettorali	1701-1783	Rustic Landscape		
18	Pietro Da Talada	1701-1783	St. John the Baptist	1463	
