= Simone del Tintore =

Italian painter (1630–1708)

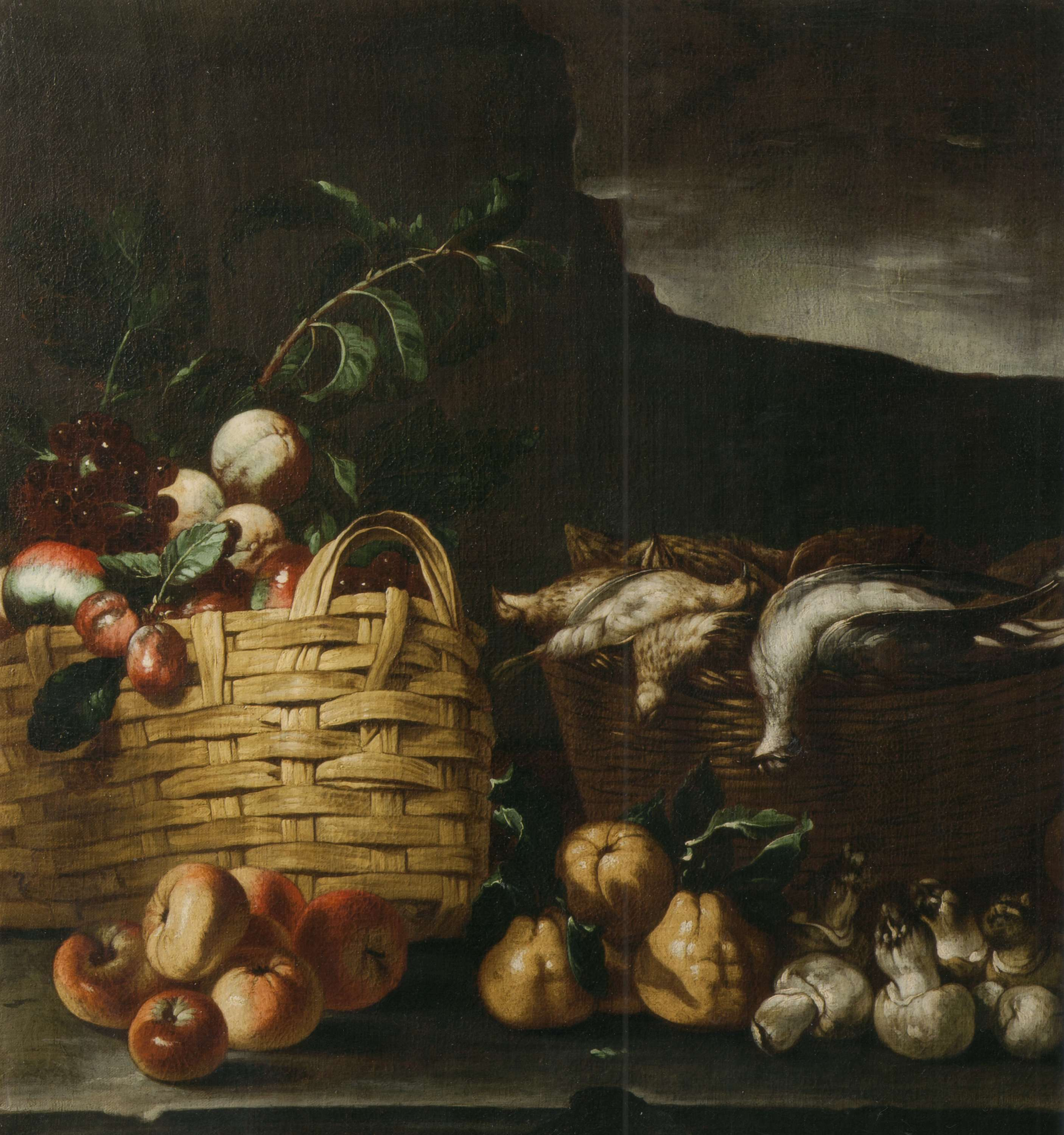
Still life with basket of fruit, birds and mushrooms in a landscape

Simone del Tintore (1630–1708) was an Italian painter, active in his native Lucca. He is mainly known as a still-life painter but he may also have painted religious subjects.

== Life ==
Simone del Tintore was born in Lucca on 7 May 1630.

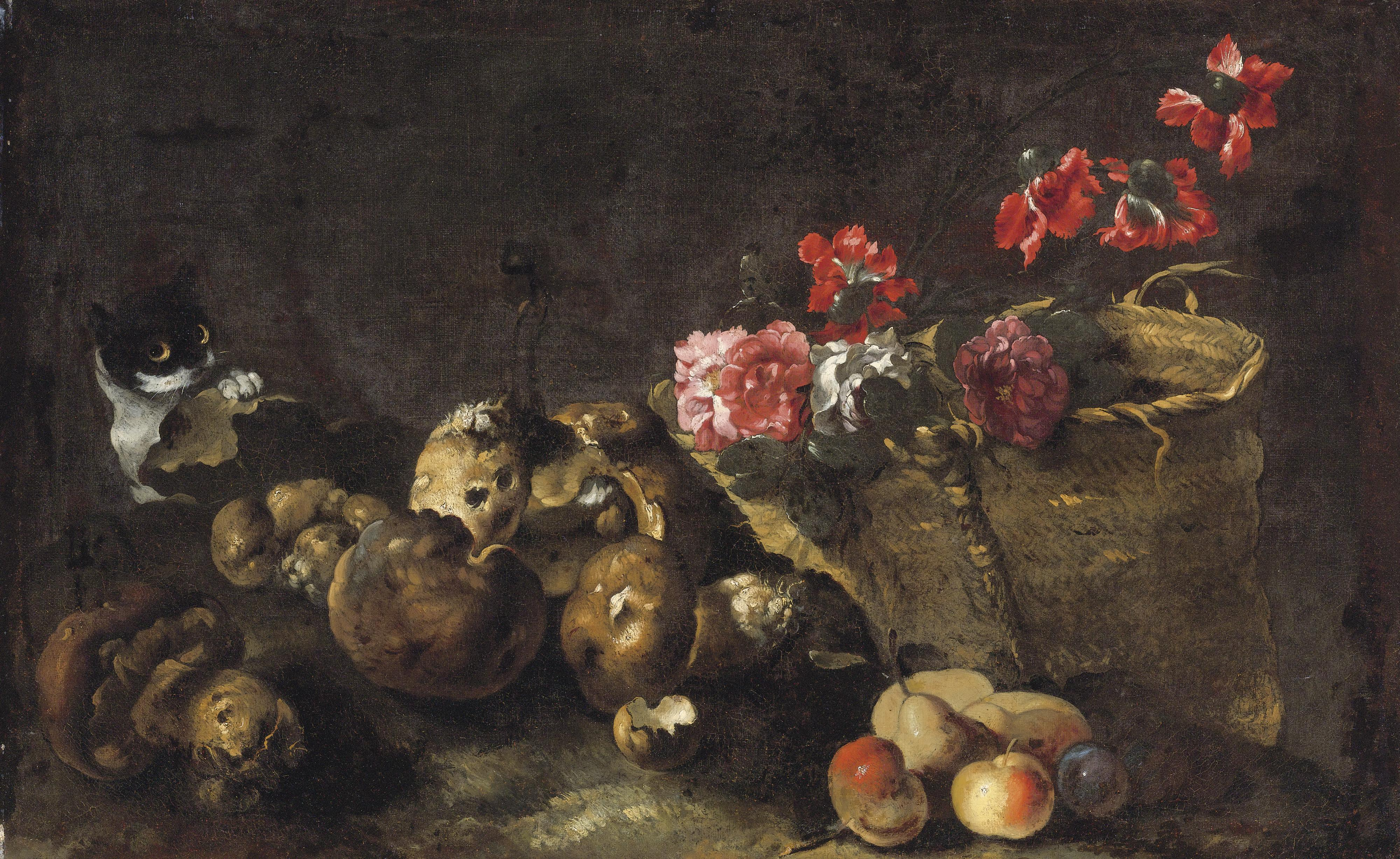
Still life with mushrooms, fruit, a basket of flowers and a cat

He trained at the 'Academy of Painting and Drawing of Lucca', which had been established by the local artist Pietro Paolini. Paolini had trained in Rome where he had become closely linked to the followers of Caravaggio. The Academy contributed to a particularly lively artistic environment in Lucca in the second half of the 17th century. Simone del Tintore and his brothers Francesco and Cassiano, as well as numerous other artists such as Girolamo Scaglia, Antonio Franchi, Giovanni Coli and Filippo Gherardi all trained at the Academy.

Simone del Tintore died in his native Lucca on 16 February 1708.

== Work ==
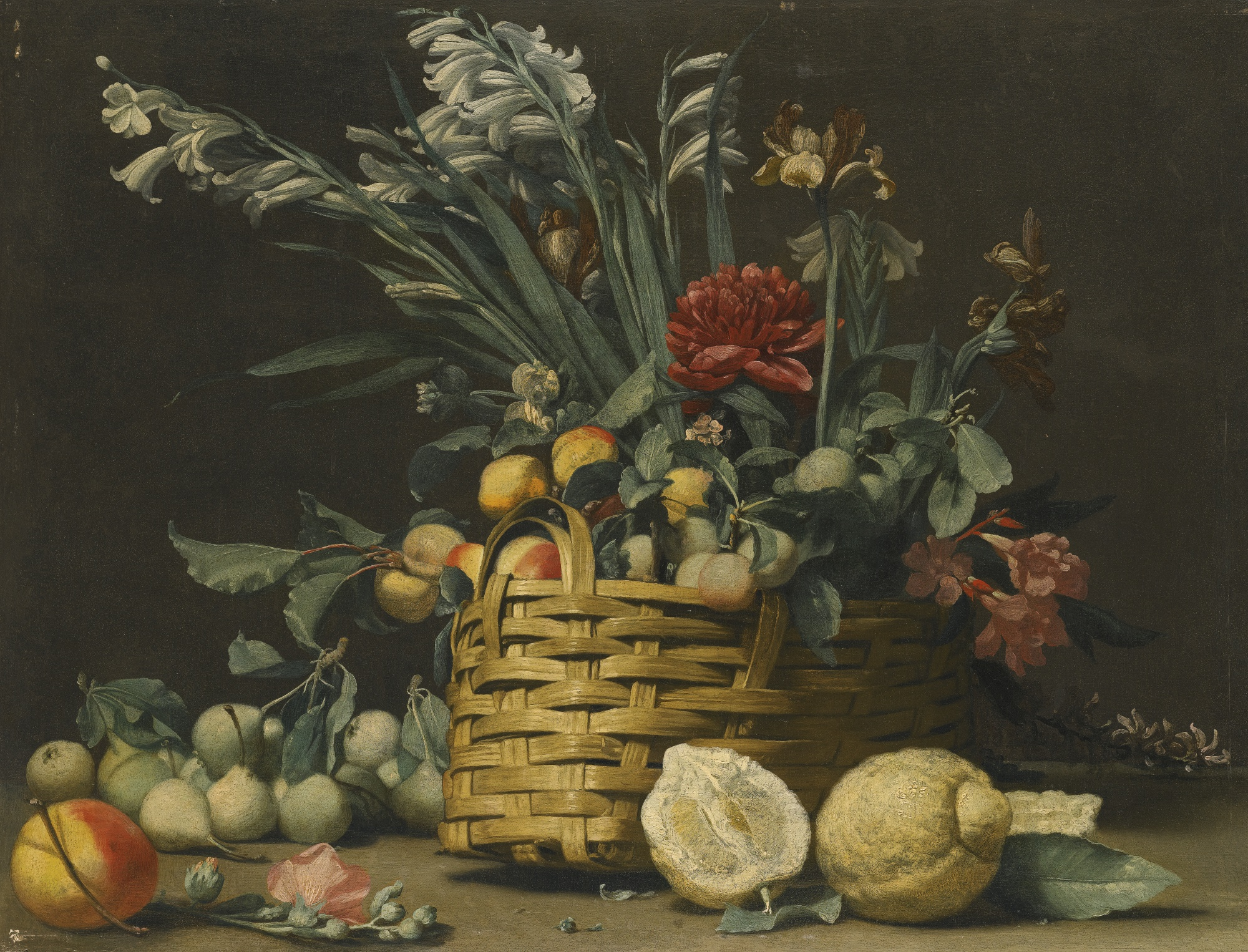
Still life with pears, apples, chrysanthemum and other flowers in a basket beside two large lemons

The works of Simone del Tintore were only first rediscovered in the 1960s. Simone del Tintore's body of work is often difficult to distinguish from that of Tommaso Salini (1575-1625). Salini was active in an earlier generation. Del Tintore's work has also been confused with that of the Master of the Acquavella Still Life.

A small group of still lifes has been attributed to del Tintore based on a shared sense of Baroque dynamism and their disordered yet harmonious compositions. The rediscovery and attribution of the artist's oeuvre is based on the Still life with mushrooms and cabbage (Florence, Gregori Collection) which is inscribed on the reverse with "Simone del Tintore". The close similarities between his style and that of Bernardo Strozzi is thought to be due to Paolini's influence, who may well have met Strozzi in Rome.

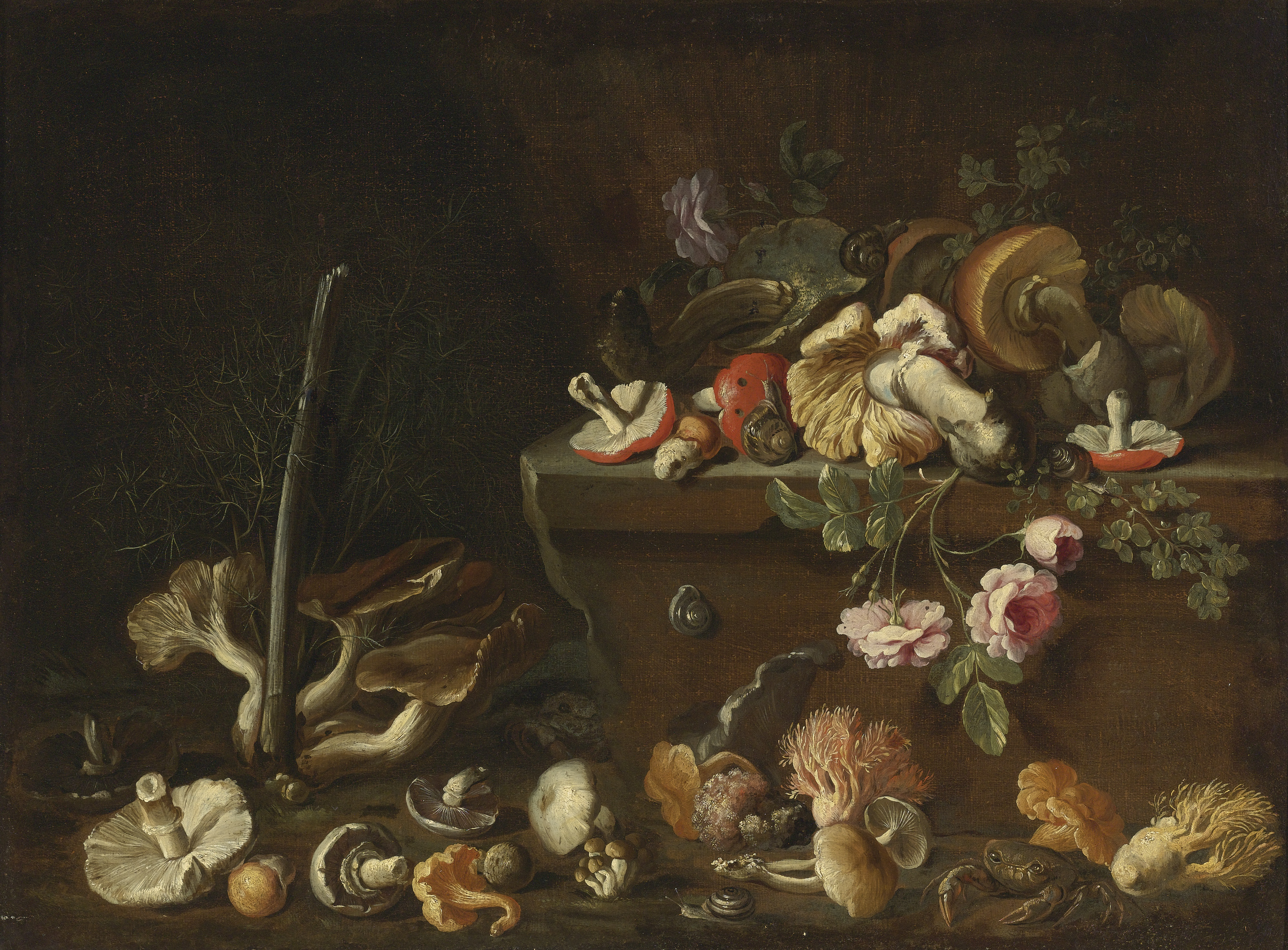
Still life with mushrooms and flowers

Del Tintore evolved from still lifes ('natura morta') to 'natura viva', compositions which included living animals and figures, occasionally painted by his teacher Pietro Paolini. Paolini's Caravaggesque naturalism is also recognizable in Simone del Tintore's work. Simone del Tintore not only collaborated with Paolini on a number of compositions but also with his brother Francesco del Tintore.

Del Tintore's favoured motifs were wicker baskets laden with fruit and mushrooms scattered about with pale, luminous green leaves transformed into a dense, dark green thanks to the use of chiaroscuro effects.

It is clear that Simone del Tintore was much appreciated by his contemporaries as a still-life painter since works by him featuring fruit, funghi, flowers and other objects are recorded in inventories and other documents from the period.
