= Palazzo Colonna =

Palace in Rome, Italy

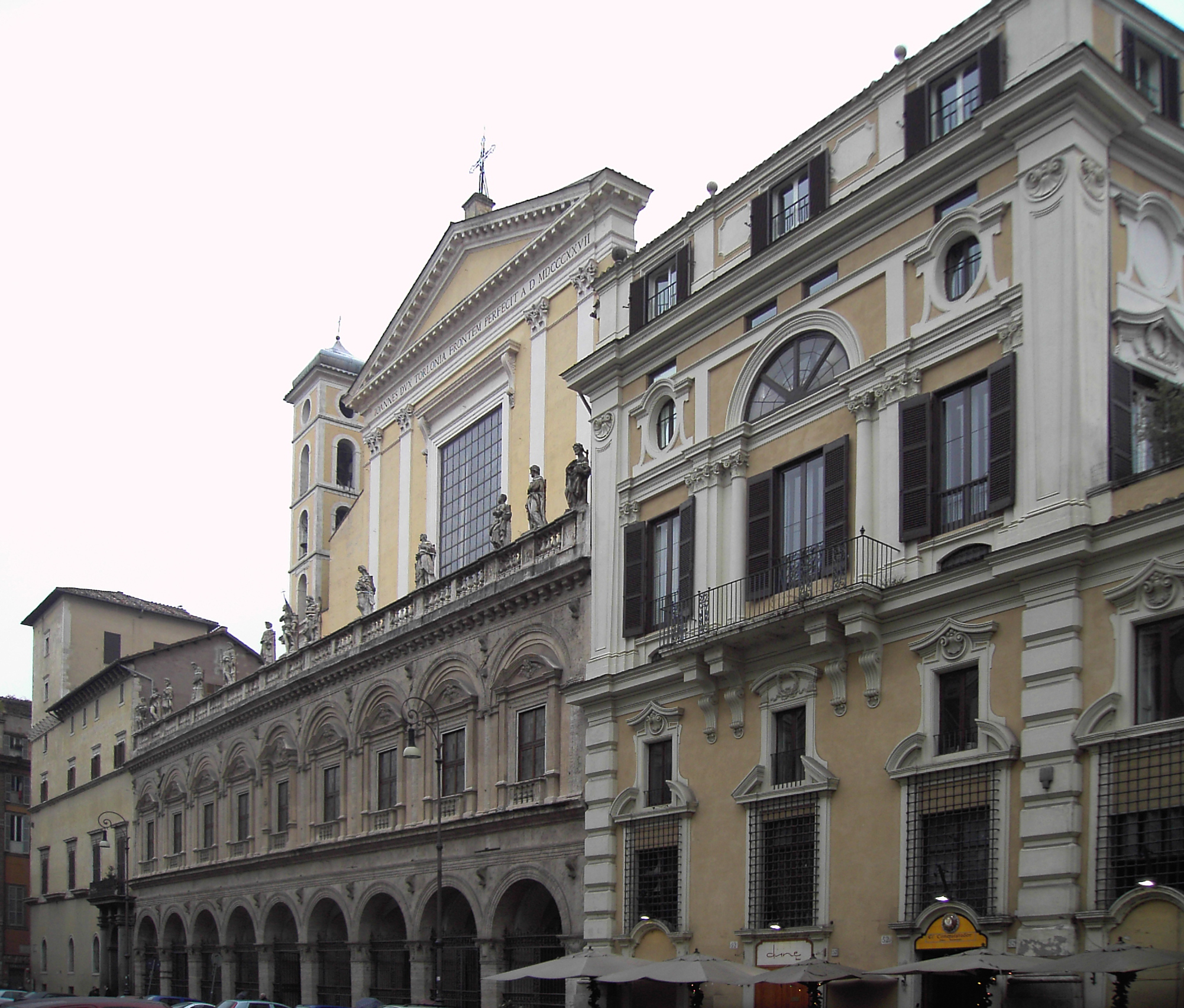
- Palazzo Colonna in 2005
- Click on the map for a fullscreen view

General information
- Location: Piazza dei Santi Apostoli, 66 I-00187 Rome, Italy
- Coordinates: 41°53′51″N 12°29′03″E

Website
- galleriacolonna.it

The Palazzo Colonna (Italian pronunciation: [paˈlattso koˈlonna, - koˈlɔnna]) is a palatial block of buildings in central Rome, Italy, at the base of the Quirinal Hill, and adjacent to the church of Santi Apostoli. It is built in part over the ruins of an old Roman serapeum, and it has belonged to the prominent Colonna family for over twenty generations.

== History ==
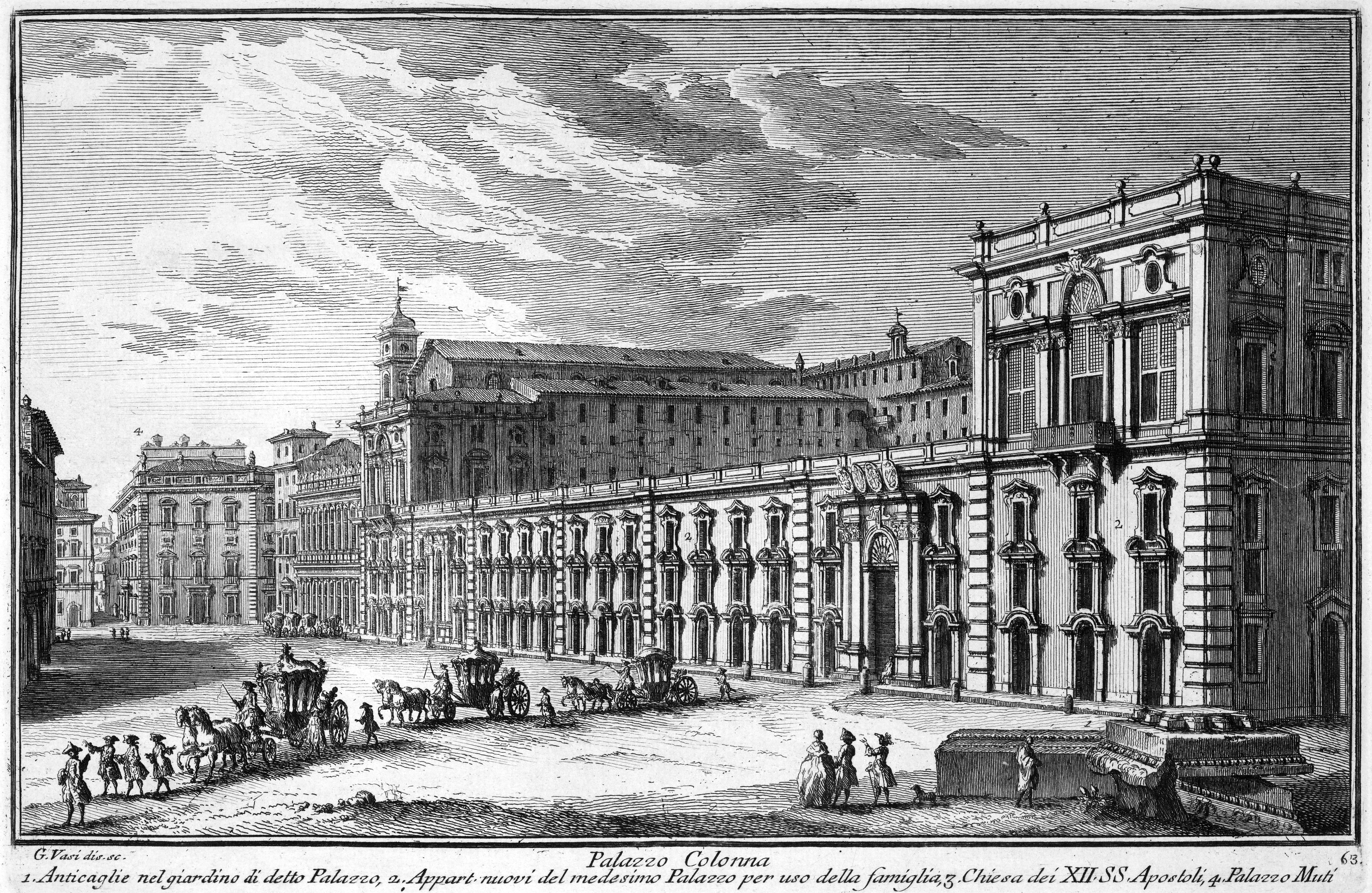
Palazzo Colonna in 1748

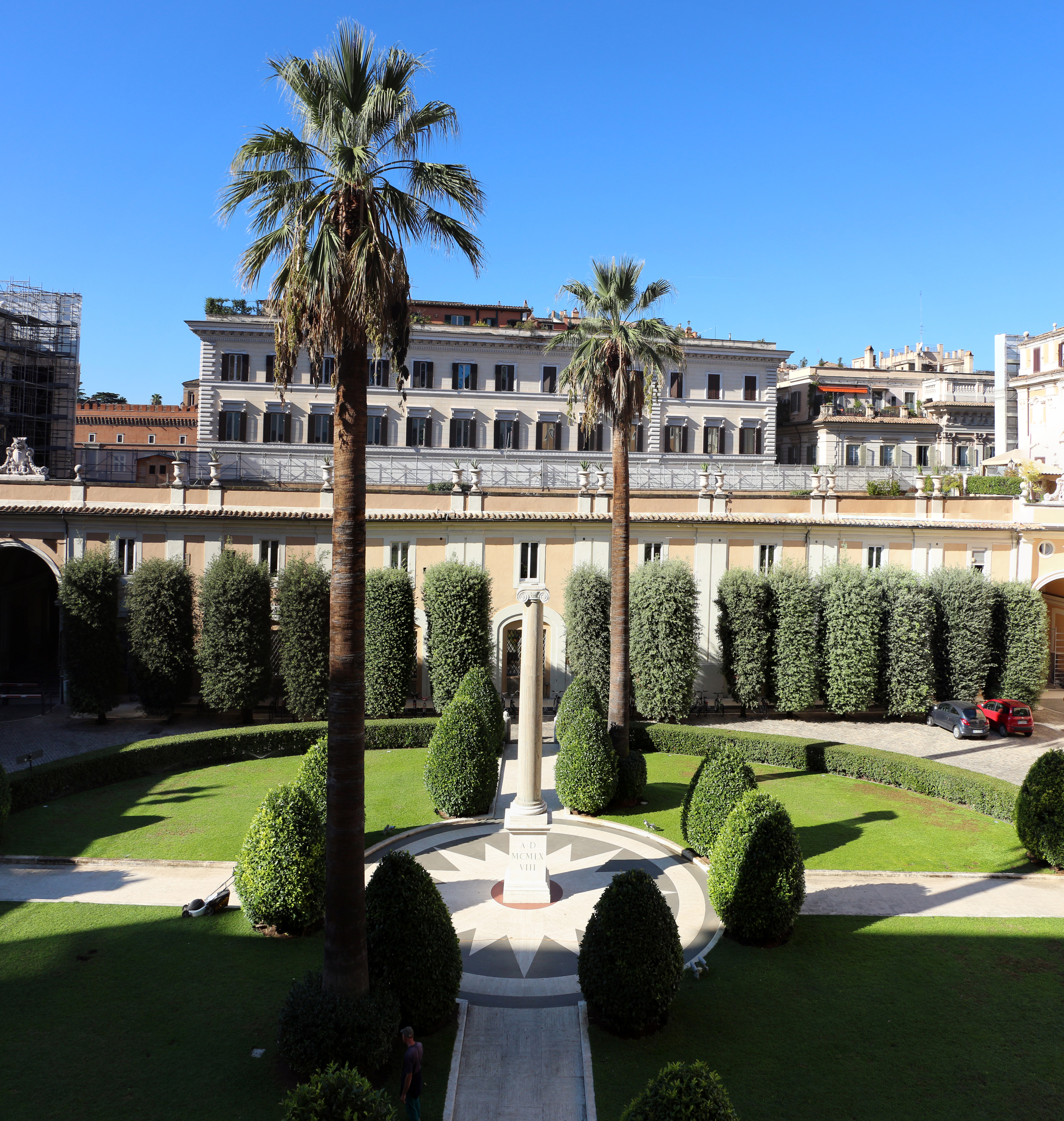
Courtyard of the palace with an ancient Roman column (the family's coat of arms symbol)

The first part of the palace dates from the 13th century, and tradition holds that the building hosted Dante during his visit to Rome. The first documentary mention notes that the property hosted Cardinals Giovanni and Giacomo Colonna in the 13th century. It was also home to Cardinal Oddone Colonna before he ascended to the papacy as Pope Martin V in 1417.

Following his death, the palace was sacked during feuds, and the main property passed into the hands of the Della Rovere family. It returned to the Colonna family when Marcantonio I Colonna married Lucrezia Gara Franciotti Della Rovere, the niece of Pope Julius II. The Colonna family's alliance to the Habsburg power likely protected the palace from looting during the Sack of Rome (1527).

Starting with Filippo Colonna (1578–1639), many changes have refurbished and create a unitary complex around a central garden. Architects including Girolamo Rainaldi and Paolo Marucelli labored on specific projects. Only in the 17th and 18th centuries were the main facades completed, one facing Piazza SS. Apostoli and the other facing Via della Pilotta. Much of this design was completed by Antonio del Grande (including the grand gallery) and Girolamo Fontana (decoration of the gallery). In the 18th century, the long low facade designed by Nicola Michetti, with later additions by Paolo Posi with taller corner blocks (facing Piazza SS. Apostoli), was constructed and recalls earlier structures resembling a fortification.

== Colonna Art Gallery ==
The main gallery (completed 1703) and the masterful Colonna art collection was acquired after 1650 by both the cardinal Girolamo I Colonna and his nephew, the Connestabile Lorenzo Onofrio Colonna. It includes works by Lorenzo Monaco, Domenico Ghirlandaio, Palma the Elder, Salviati, Bronzino, Tintoretto, Pietro da Cortona, Annibale Carracci (painting of The Beaneater), Guercino, Francesco Albani, Muziano and Guido Reni. Ceiling frescoes by Filippo Gherardi, Giovanni Coli, Sebastiano Ricci, and Giuseppe Bartolomeo Chiari celebrate the role of Marcantonio II Colonna in the battle of Lepanto (1571). An Apotheosis of Martin V was painted by Benedetto Luti. There are frescoed apartments completed after 1664 by Crescenzio Onofri, Gaspard Dughet and Pieter Mulier II (nicknamed "Cavalier Tempesta"). Other rooms were frescoed in the 18th century by Pompeo Batoni and Pietro Bianchi.

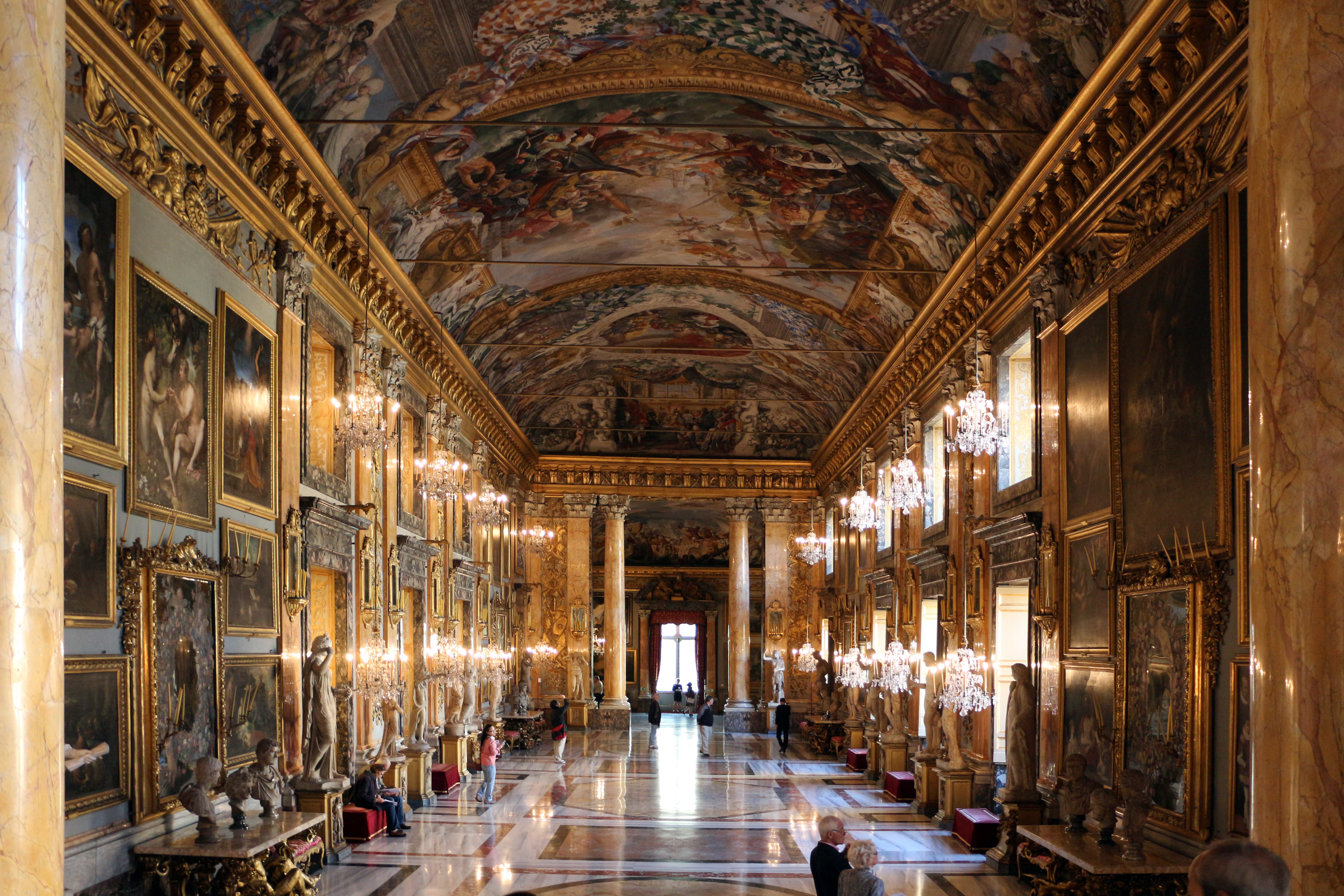
Galleria Colonna

The older wing of the complex, now known as Princess Isabelle's apartments, but once housing Martin V's library and palace, contains frescoes by Pinturicchio, Antonio Tempesta, Crescenzio Onofri, Giacinto Gimignani, and Carlo Cesi. It also contains a collection of landscapes and genre scenes by painters like Gaspard Dughet, Caspar Van Wittel (Vanvitelli), and Jan Brueghel the Elder.

Along with the possessions of the Doria-Pamphilij and Pallavicini-Rospigliosi families, this is one of the largest private art collections in Rome.

== In popular culture ==
The ending scene from the 1953 classic film Roman Holiday, starring Audrey Hepburn and Gregory Peck, was shot at the gallery.

Preceded by Chigi Palace	Landmarks of Rome; Palazzo Colonna	Succeeded by Palazzo della Consulta
