= Giovanni Domenico Lombardi =

Italian painter (1682–1751)

Giovanni Domenico Lombardi (1682–1751) was an Italian painter of the late-Baroque period in Lucca. His work shows the influence of rising neoclassicism but enveloped by an attention to Caravaggist quotations. He was a pupil of Giovanni Marracci in Lucca. He was likely influenced by Pietro Paolino (died 1681).

== Works ==
- St Francis Xavier blessing those afflicted with the plague, Musée des beaux-arts de Chambéry.
- Interior of Palace with countryside view
- Allegories of Faith and Charity
- Twenty-two tableaux, Rougnat church, Creuse (Limousin).
