= Tiberio Fiorilli =

Italian actor (1608–1694)

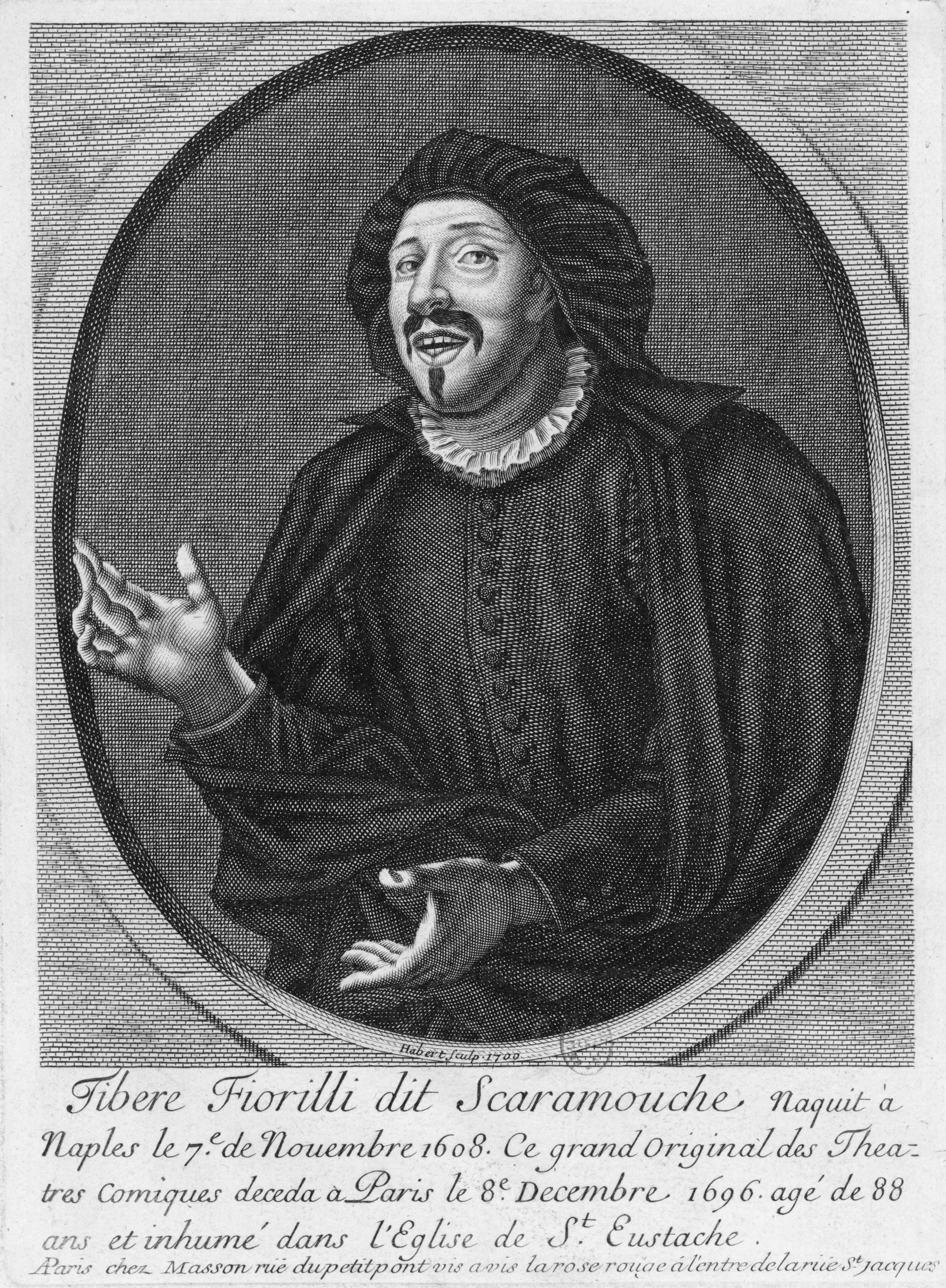
"That excellent comedian..." Tiberio Fiorilli in a 1700 engraving.

Tiberio Fiorilli, also spelled Fiorillo and Fiurelli (November 9, 1608 – December 7, 1694) was an Italian actor of commedia dell'arte known for developing the role of Scaramouche. He was especially popular in France, where he was the director of the troupe of the Comédie-Italienne, which shared with the troupe of his friend Molière at the theatre of the Petit-Bourbon, and the theatre of the Palais-Royal.

== Life ==
He was born in Naples, but left Italy around 1640 for unknown reasons, perhaps simply while following a troupe of actors, or to flee a political intrigue. He arrived in France under the reign of Louis XIII. His acting pleased the queen, which enabled him to attend the court.

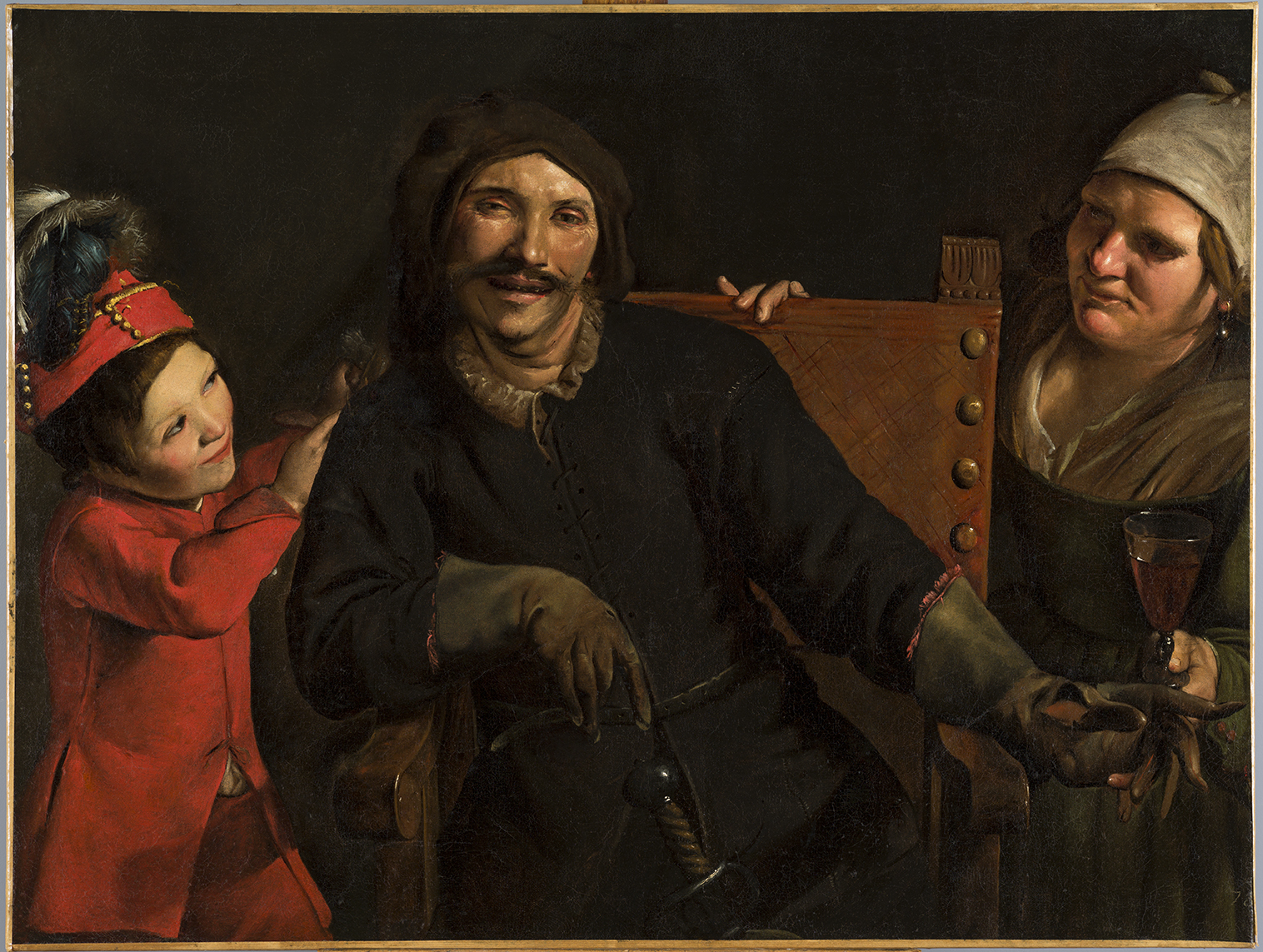
Portrait of Tiberio Fiorilli as Scaramouche by Pietro Paolini

It is said that one day, when the two-year-old Dauphin cried (the future Louis XIV), Fiorilli, as Scaramouche, made any possible sound to comfort him. He achieved this task with grimaces and tomfoolery; consequently, the Dauphin had "a need, that he had at the time, the hands and the dress of Scaramouche". Fiorilli was then ordered to visit the court every night to amuse the Dauphin, which helped the Scaramouche character become a stock figure in the theatre of the time. The character of Scaramouche became a standard role thereafter of the commedia dell'arte.

Fiorilli's style differed from other commedia dell'arte players. He abandoned the mask and used the expressiveness of his face to enhance the comedy. His large eyes and eyebrows and long nose contributed to this effect, and he wore moustaches that framed the corners of his mouth and a thin, short goatee. These practices influenced Molière, and by most accounts the two actors developed a close relationship during the years they shared the same theaters. Some critics went so far as to accuse Molière of being Scaramouche's ape. One engraving shows Molière mimicking Scaramouche's grimaces with the help of a mirror.

In the 1670s Fiorilli portrayed Scaramouche in London with great success. He was capable of deft physical farce, including dancing and acrobatics. It is reported that in his 80s he maintained the ability to simulate a kick to another actor's face.

Fiorilli died in Paris and is buried in the Église Saint-Eustache.

== In literature ==
Scaramouche (Fiorilli) teaching Élomire (Molière) his student, frontispiece to Le Boulanger de Chalussay's attack on Molière, 1670

- Angelo Costantini, called Mezetin, wrote a "picaresque but untrustworthy biography": La Vie de Scaramouche (The Life of Scaramouche), published in Paris in 1695 and Brussels in 1699.
- Rafael Sabatini wrote a novel entitled Scaramouche, remotely inspired by Fiorilli's life.
- A stage musical, Scaramouche - The Zany Commedia Musical, with book, lyrics and music by Stephen Lanigan-O'Keeffe, was premiered in Hoxton Hall, London, UK in 2007 and revised and restaged in 2011. The musical is a fusion of musical theatre and commedia dell'arte practices and treats Fiorillo's life and career as a parable on celebrity culture.

== Bibliography ==
- Banham, Martin (1995). The Cambridge Guide to the Theatre. Cambridge: Cambridge University Press. ISBN 9780521434379.
- Campardon, Émile (1880). Les Comédiens du roi de la troupe italienne, two volumes. Paris: Berger-Levrault. View vols. 1 and 2 at Internet Archive.
- Costantini, Angelo (1695). La Vie de Scaramouche. Paris: Claude Barbin. 1695 edition (at Internet Archive); 1699 edition, Brussels (OCLC 25618643); 1876 edition (at Internet Archive), with an introduction and notes by Louis Moland. Brussels: Jules Bonassies.
- Gaines, James F. (2002). The Molière Encyclopedia. Westport, Connecticut: Greenwood Press. ISBN 9780313312557.
- Maupoint (1733). Biblioteque des theatres. Paris: Chez Pierre Prault. Listings at WorldCat. View at Google Books.
