= Giovanni Coli =

Italian painter

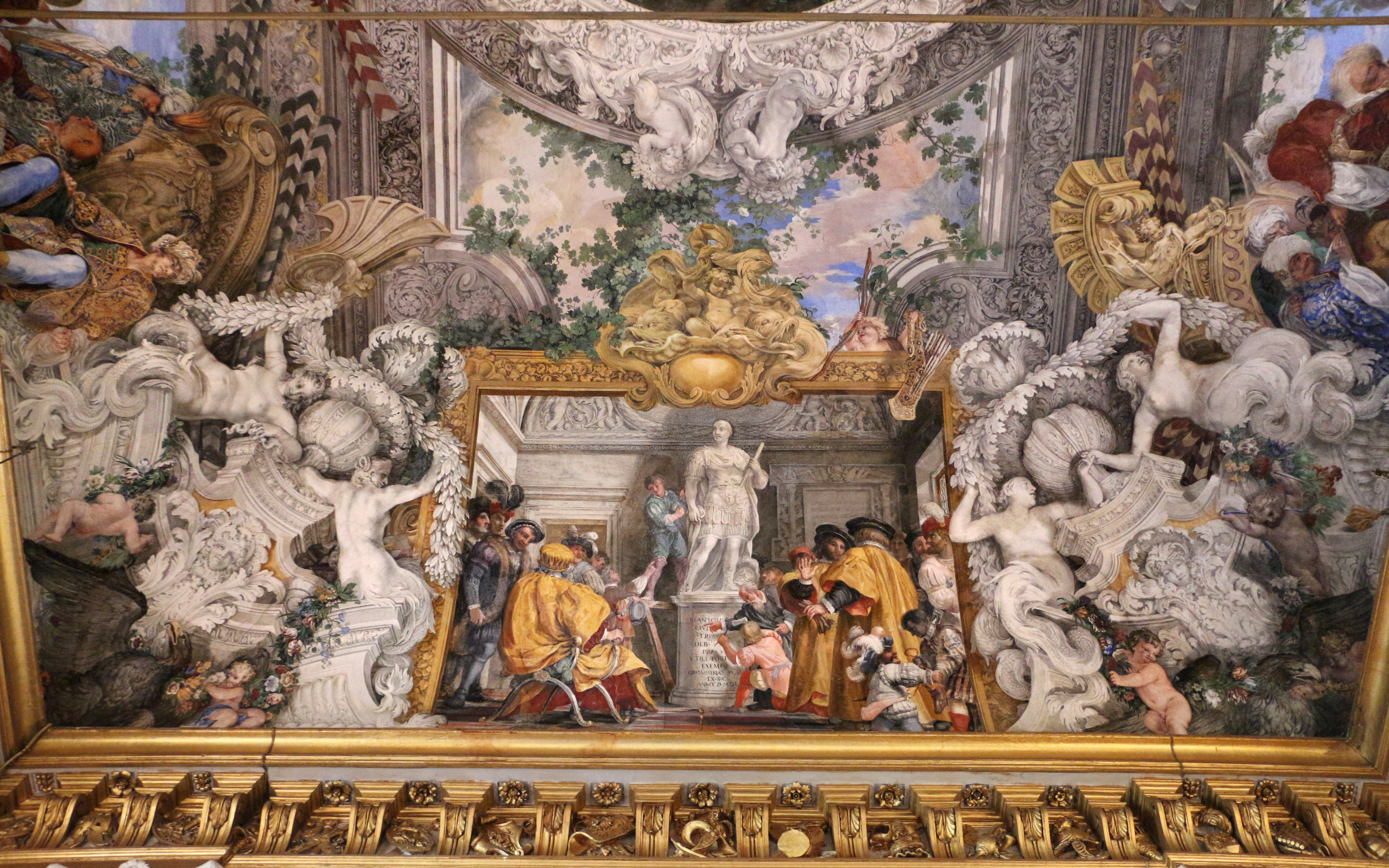
Coli and Gherardi, fresco ceiling with the Battle of Lepanto in the Palazzo Colonna, Rome, 1675–78

Giovanni Coli (1636–1691) was an Italian painter from Lucca, active in the Baroque style.

He trained with Pietro Paolini in Lucca and then moved to Rome to work under Pietro da Cortona. He often worked alongside Filippo Gherardi. With Coli, Gherardi was initially a trainee of Pietro Paolini in Lucca. In Venice, Coli and Gherardi also completed frescoes (1670–72) of the dome of the church of San Nicolò da Tolentino with a fresco of the Glory of San Nicolò, and in the massive decoration of the church of San Pantalon. In Venice, Coli and Gherardi frescoed the Library of San Giorgio Maggiore.

== Bibliography ==
- D. Ton, Giovanni Coli. Filippo Gherardi, in "Saggi e Memorie di Storia dell'Arte", 31, 2007 (2009), pp. 1–174.
