= San Micheletto, Lucca =

Church building in Lucca, Italy

San Micheletto is a Baroque- style, now-deconsecrated Roman Catholic church located on a street of the same name in Lucca, region of Tuscany, Italy.

== History ==
A church at the site was present since the 8th century, but the present 12th-century church was attached in the 15th century to a Clarissan monastery.

Further reconstruction occurred in the 18th century, a few Romanesque touches remain. In 2015, the convent houses the Fondazione Ragghianti, with its photographic and media archives and library.
