= Girolamo Scaglia =

Italian painter (1620–1686)

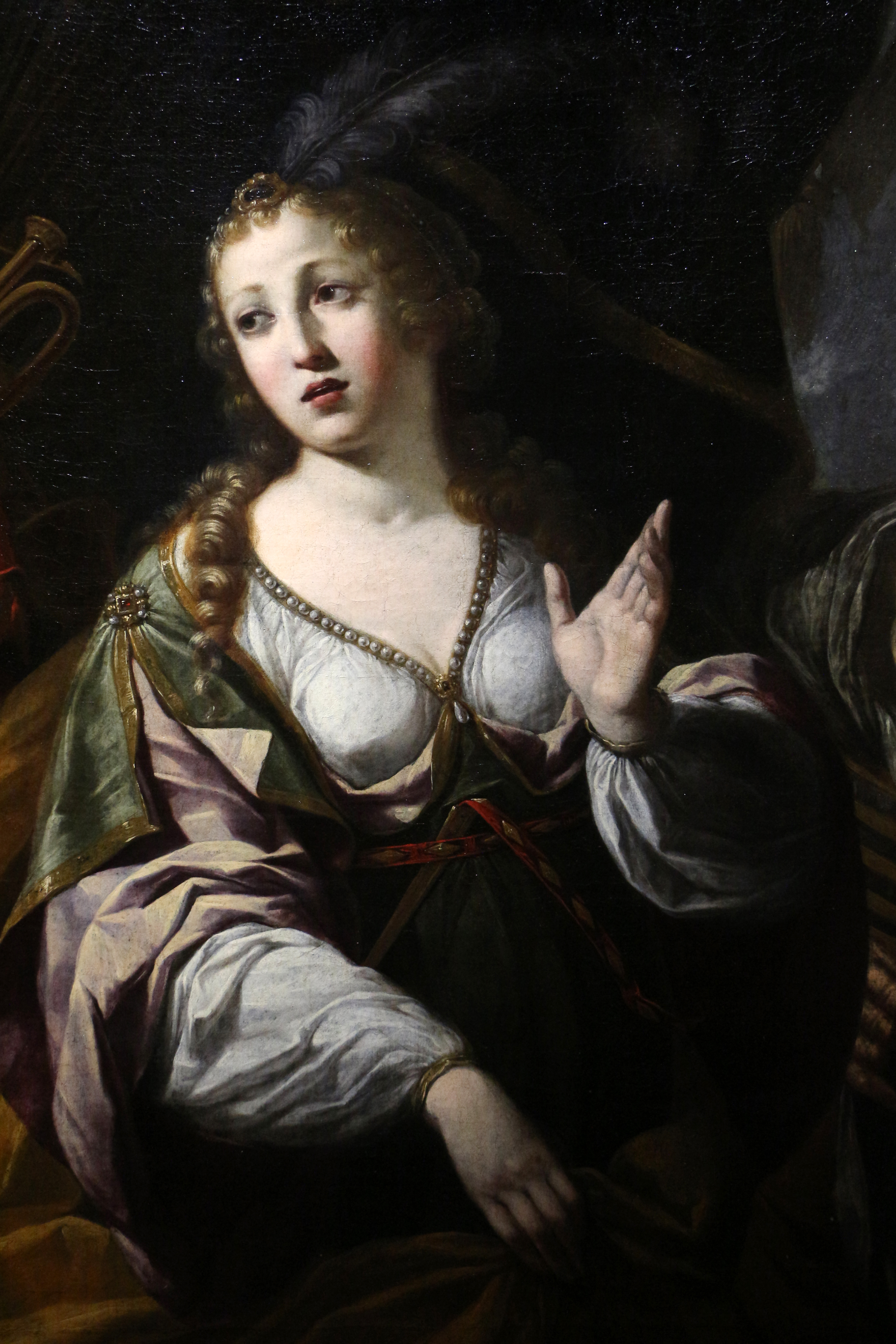
Judith (Detail), oil on canvas, priv. col.

Girolamo Scaglia (1620 – 1686) was an Italian painter of the Baroque period. He was born in Lucca, and trained there with Pietro Paolini.

== Biography ==
Born in Lucca in 1620, Scaglia was a pupil of the Baroque painter Pietro Paolini, with whom he worked for about forty years. He also frequented the studio of Paolo Biancucci, another leading Lucchese painter of the day. Among the Tuscan painters of the Baroque period, Scaglia stands out for his distinctive soft stroke and for his versatility: he painted sacred subjects, but also original allegorical personifications and accurate and lively genre landscapes. Noteworthy in his paintings are the depictions of bas-reliefs, busts, and ornaments. His overall pictorial production bears witness, in addition to his eclecticism, to his admirable talent for still lifes, often present in his paintings. Once considered only a marginal disciple of Pietro Paolini, Scaglia is receiving growing critical acclaim.
