= Pietro Paolini =

Italian painter

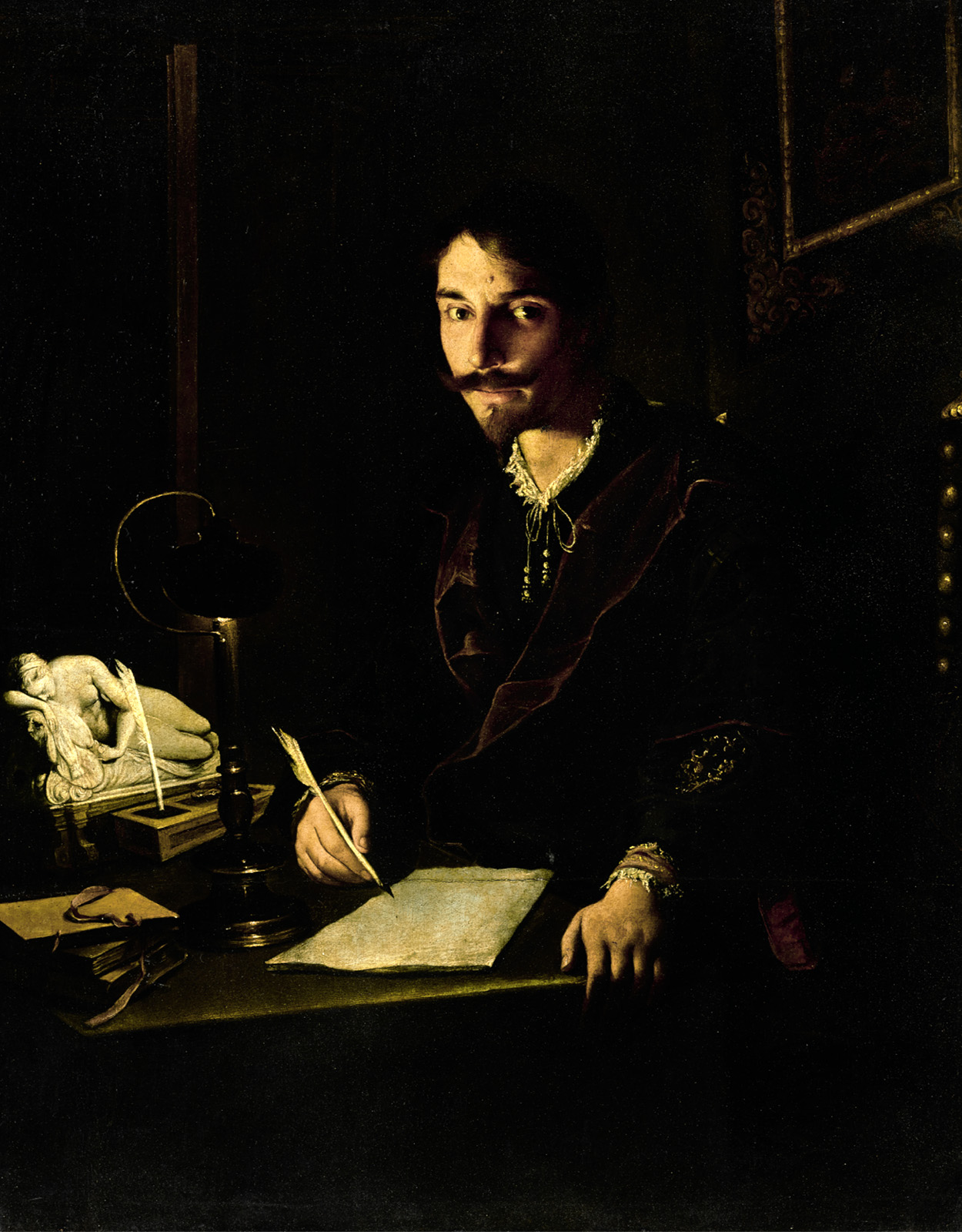
- Man Writing by Candlelight, c. 1620, priv. col.
- Born: 3 June 1603; Lucca, Republic of Lucca
- Died: 12 April 1681 (aged 77); Lucca, Republic of Lucca
- Other name: il Lucchese
- Education: Angelo Caroselli
- Known for: Painting
- Movement: Baroque

Pietro Paolini, called il Lucchese (3 June 1603 – 12 April 1681) was an Italian painter of the Baroque period. Working in Rome, Venice and finally his native Lucca, he was a follower of Caravaggio to whose work he responded in a very personal manner. He founded an Academy in his hometown, which formed the next generation of painters of Lucca.

== Life ==
Pietro Paolini was born in Lucca, as the youngest son of Tommaso Paolini and Ginevra Raffaelli. His family was well-off as his mother was a descendant of a prominent Lucchese family.

Paolini's father sent his son to Rome to the workshop of Angelo Caroselli when he was 16 years old. Angelo Caroselli was a follower of Caravaggio who worked in an eclectic style. Whereas in the past the relationship between Caroselli and Paolini was regarded solely as that of a master and apprentice, more recently discovered materials point to a more complex relationship, more akin to that of collaborators and characterised by the sharing of themes. Caroselli was continuously absent from Rome from June 1616 until February 1623 so it would have been impossible for Caroselli to be Paolini's master. Paolini’s documented presence in Lucca in 1626, at least for the period June–October further limits the period of their interaction. In Caroselli's workshop Pietro Paolini had the opportunity to study the various schools and techniques, which is reflected in the stylistic flexibility of his work.

In Rome Paolini was exposed to the influence of the second generation of naturalist painters in the Caravaggesque tradition whose principal representative was Bartolomeo Manfredi and also included Cecco del Caravaggio and Bartolomeo Cavarozzi.

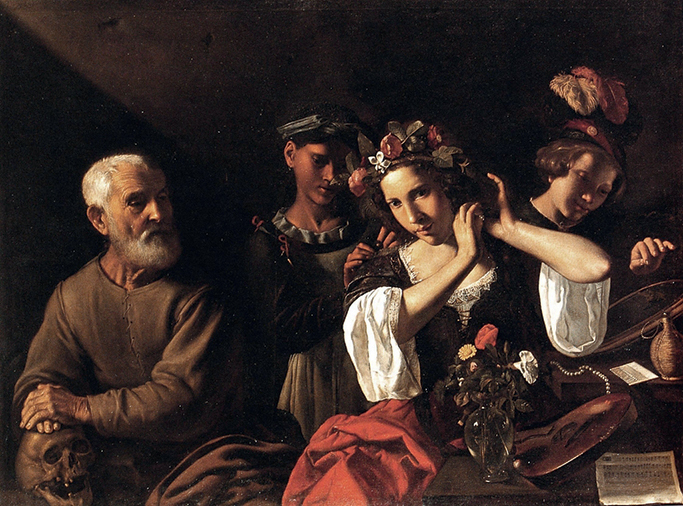
The ages of life, Lucca, P. Mazzarosa de’ Vincenzi priv. col.

From c. 1629-1631 he lived for two years in Venice where he had the opportunity to admire the works of Paolo Veronese and Tintoretto. He returned to Lucca, where he lived the remainder of his life. His parents had died in previous years and he needed to support his many siblings. After establishing a successful studio in Lucca he specialised in cabinet pictures often including allegorical or musical subjects and still lifes, a genre which he introduced to the city. He received multiple commissions from religious institutions in Lucca as well as prominent local citizens.

On 25 November 1651 Paolini married Maria Forisportam Angela di Girolamo Massei, by whom he had two sons: Andrea, who became custodian of the Public Archives, and Giovanni Tommaso.

Around 1652 (or possibly even earlier) Paolini founded the 'Academy of Painting and Drawing of Lucca', at which he helped train many painters. The Academy contributed to a particularly lively artistic environment in Lucca in the second half of the 17th century. Numerous artists, such as Girolamo Scaglia, Simone del Tintore (a still-life painter) and his brothers Francesco and Cassiano, Antonio Franchi, Giovanni Coli and Filippo Gherardi were trained at the Academy. Pietro Testa may also have been a pupil of Paolini. Paolini owned a collection of coins and plaster casts taken from ancient models as well as a collection of ancient and modern weapons that were used as models and props in the Academy.

Paolini later almost entirely abandoned painting in order to devote himself to teaching. He died in Lucca in 1681.

== Work ==
=== General ===
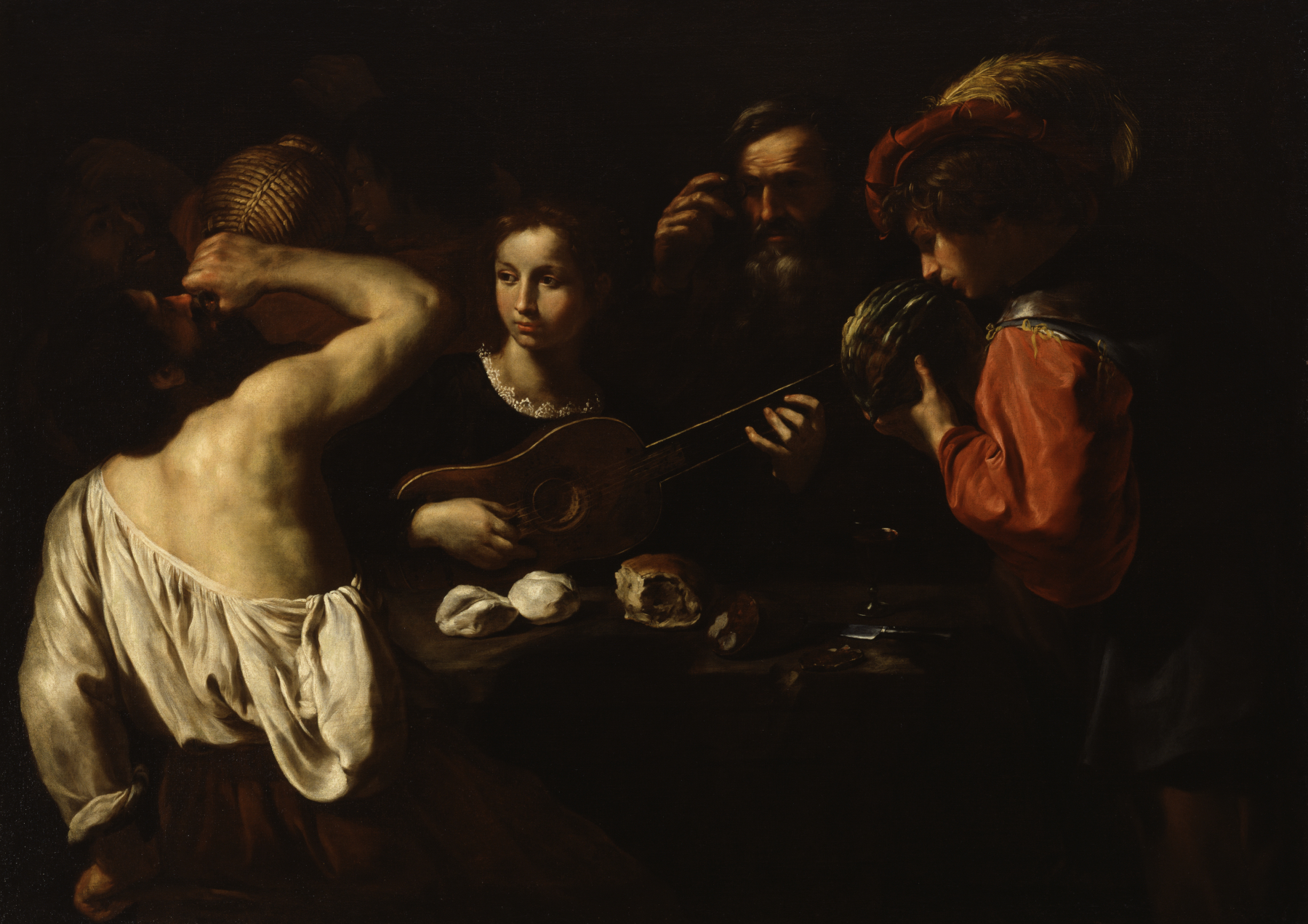
Allegory of the Five Senses, Walters Art Museum, Baltimore

Only two works in Paolini's oeuvre can be dated with any certainty. They are the Mystic Marriage of Saint Catherine signed and dated 1636 and the Birth of Saint John the Baptist commissioned the following year for Santa Maria Corteorlandini. These are both dateable to immediately after the artist's return to Lucca. The rest of his body of work is largely undocumented.

The principal themes of Paolini's work were the subjects popularized by Caravaggio in Roman painting around the turn of the 17th century. They included depictions of low-class people such as fraudsters, charlatans, hawkers, prostitutes and musicians. He typically only placed a few figures in a scene. Characteristic of Paolini's work are the balanced, simple division of the canvases, the plasticity of the figures, the enigmatically vague expressions, the smooth, radiant complexion of the figures as well as the accuracy in which he rendered materials and objects such as musical instruments.

Paolini also painted religious and mythological compositions during his early days and a few ones on commission when he was back in Lucca. These religious compositions form only a small part of his oeuvre. An example of a mythological composition is the early work Achilles among the Daughters of Lycomedes (1625-1630, J. Paul Getty Museum).

The thesis that Paolini was a painter of still lifes because he was the master of a leading still-life painter like Simone del Tintore is not well supported. In the few compositions in which his hand is clearly recognizable it is clear that Paolini limited his intervention to the figures.

=== Allegorical paintings ===
A number of his paintings have allegorical meanings such as the Allegory of the Five Senses (Walters Art Museum). This composition depicts a darkened inn with a number of low-life persons engaged in music making and drinking. Each person is an allegorical representation of one of the five senses. Sound is represented by the woman with a lute, at center; taste, by the man emptying a flask of wine; smell, by the young man with a melon; sight, by the man on the right holding a pair of spectacles; and touch, by the two people who are fighting. This painting dates from his early years in Rome and shows the realism and strong chiaroscuro typical of Caravaggio and his followers.

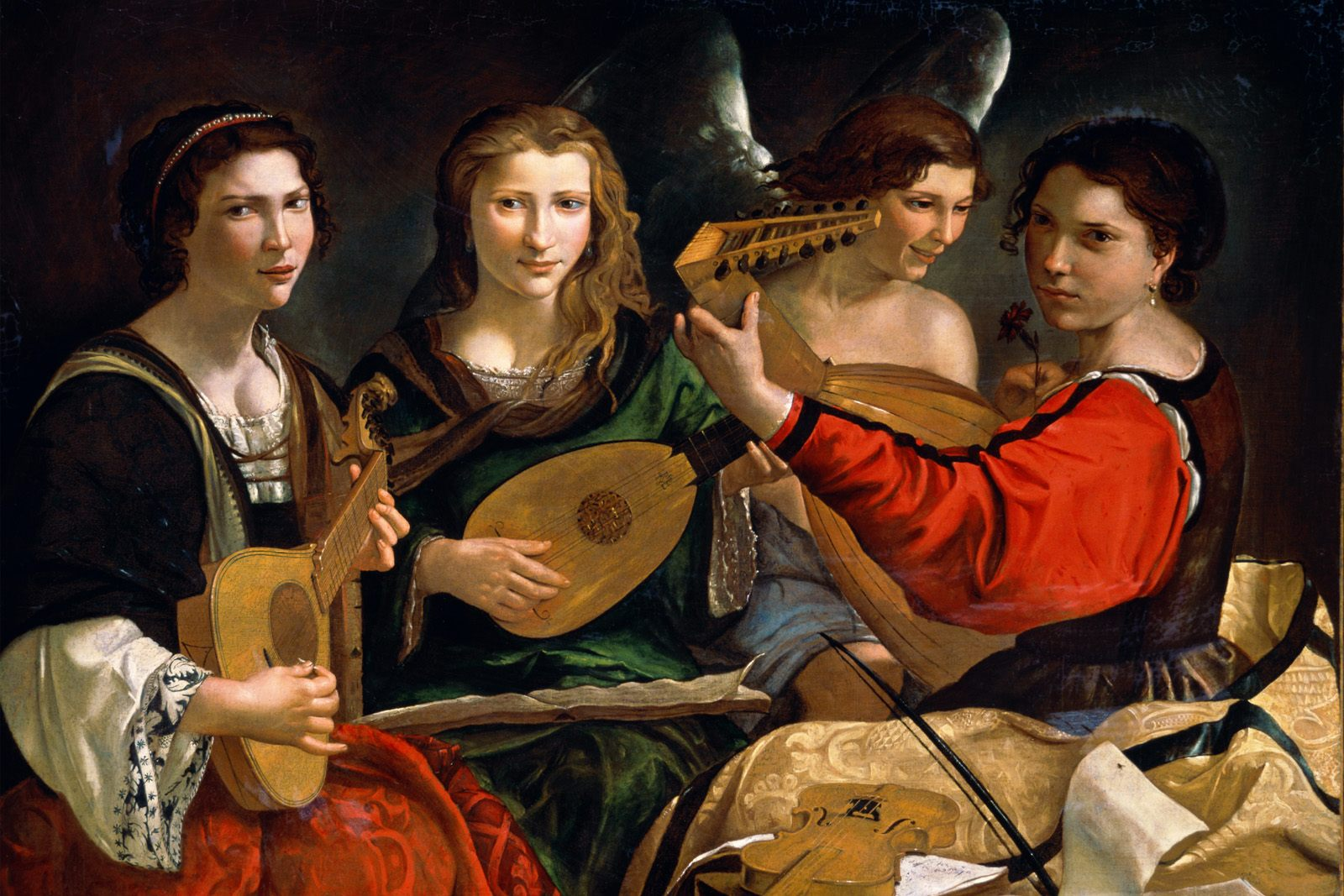
The Concert, J. Paul Getty Museum, Malibu

His works often took direct inspiration from Caravaggio's compositions. Examples are two concert paintings, The Concert (c. 1620-1630, formerly in the J. Paul Getty Museum, Malibu) and the Bacchic Concert (c. 1625-30, Dallas Museum of Art), from his early days in Rome. The two works represent the artist's reaction to Caravaggio's The Musicians, which he may have seen in the collection of Cardinal del Monte.

The general features of The Concert and several of its details, such as the still life of the violin and open part-book with an upturned page, are directly derived from Caravaggio's composition. Paolini replaced Caravaggio's androgynous youths in loose-fitting blouses with three women in contemporary dress, one of whom plays a cittern while the others play lutes. The individualized physiognomies suggest portraits and Paolini clearly intended to suggest an actual performance.

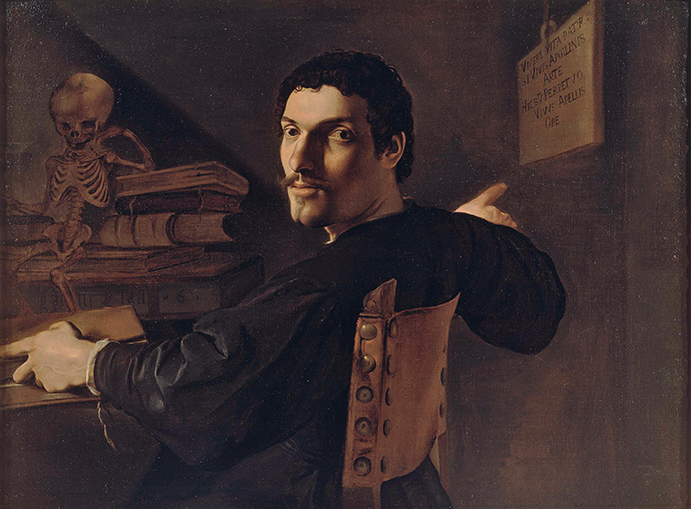
Portrait of a man, priv. col.

Trios of female musicians achieved considerable fame in this period. The inclusion of Cupid, who replaces Caravaggio's self-portrait with a cornetto, shows that the picture was intended as an allegory of Love and Music presented in the guise of an actual concert. This was a common theme in the pictorial tradition of the 16th century, which depicted Love as being born from Music, or Love as always being in the company of Music". The red carnation proffered by Cupid to one of the women is a pointed allusion to this relationship between Love and Music. The gesture may also imply that the three women are offering their love to the viewer, a theme of many 16th-century paintings with musical subjects.

=== Portraits ===
Paolini created a number of portraits, often with an allegorical meaning and depicting persons engaged in a certain profession or activity. These works are all datable between the third and fourth decades of the 17th century.

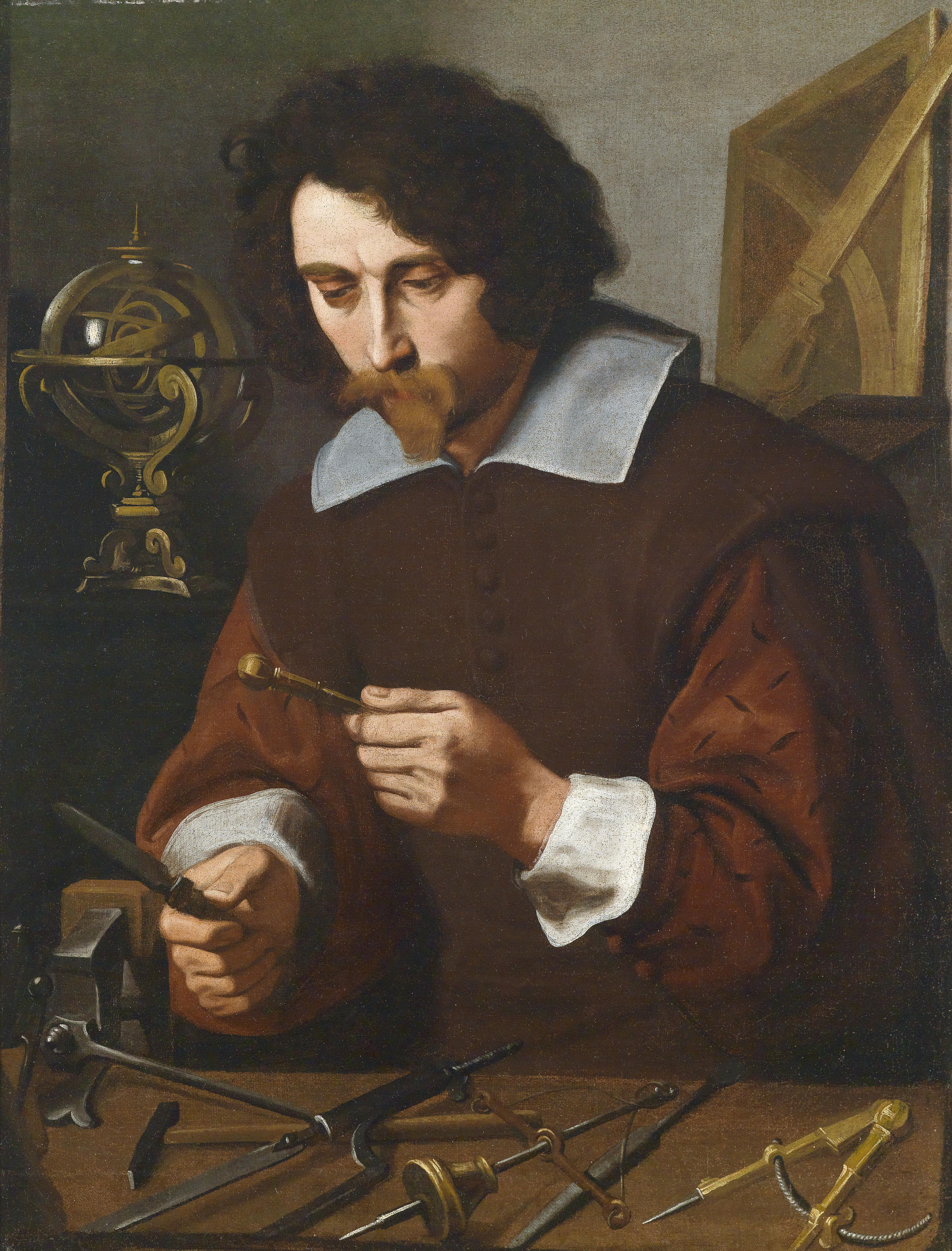
An inventor of Mathematical instruments, c. 1640, priv. col.

An example is A young lady holding a compass (At Sotheby's 9 December 2009, London, lot 28). It depicts a young woman holding a compass in her right hand who appears to be drawing geometric designs for an arch on a piece of paper she holds in her left hand. As it was highly unusual at the time to show a woman engaged in architectural design, it has been suggested that the work may be an allegorical portrait representing Architecture. On the other hand, the figure's highly naturalistic physiognomy is rather too specific for an 'allegorical' or 'idealised' portrait. The expression of the model appears observed from a specific person and she is wearing contemporary dress.

The blending of the real and the ideal is characteristic of Paolini's male portraiture as well. His Man holding a mask, despite its emblematic overtones, shows a youth whose features are rendered like those of a real person. This blending of fidelity to life and idealisation, the mysterious and fascinating is also present in a group of five oval paintings that date to the first half of the 17th century. They include a Portrait of a Young Page, a Lute Maker, a Violin Maker, an Old Woman Sewing and an Old Woman Spinning. These portraits are genre paintings likely conveying an allegorical meaning on the subject of harmony.

Paolini also made a few portraits of actors among which there are two of the actor Tiberio Fiorilli as Scaramouche. Paolini may have met the actor in Rome or in Tuscany when Fiorilli was living there.

== Gallery ==
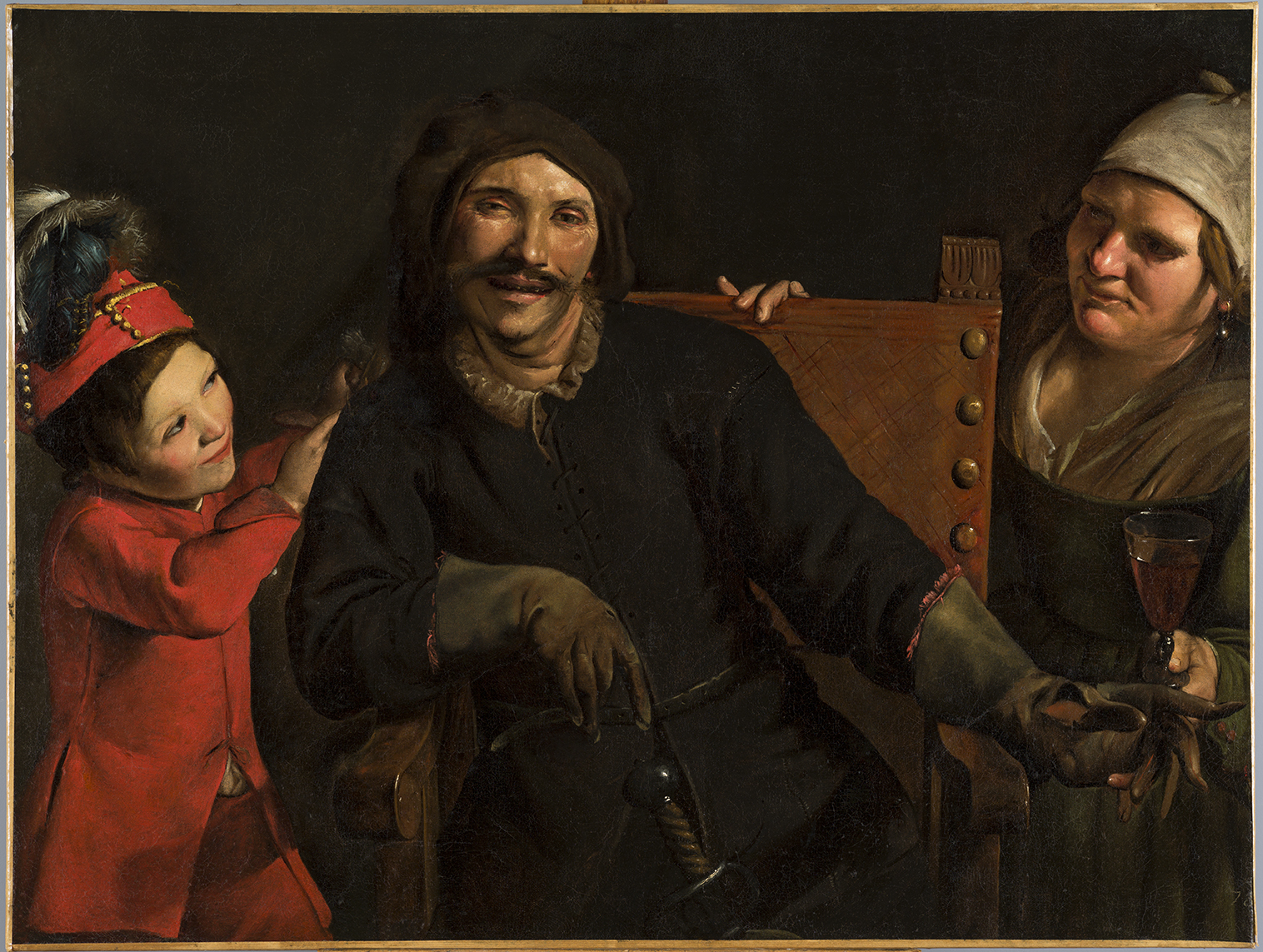
Portrait of Tiberio Fiorilli as Scaramouche, c. 1630, Palace of Versailles

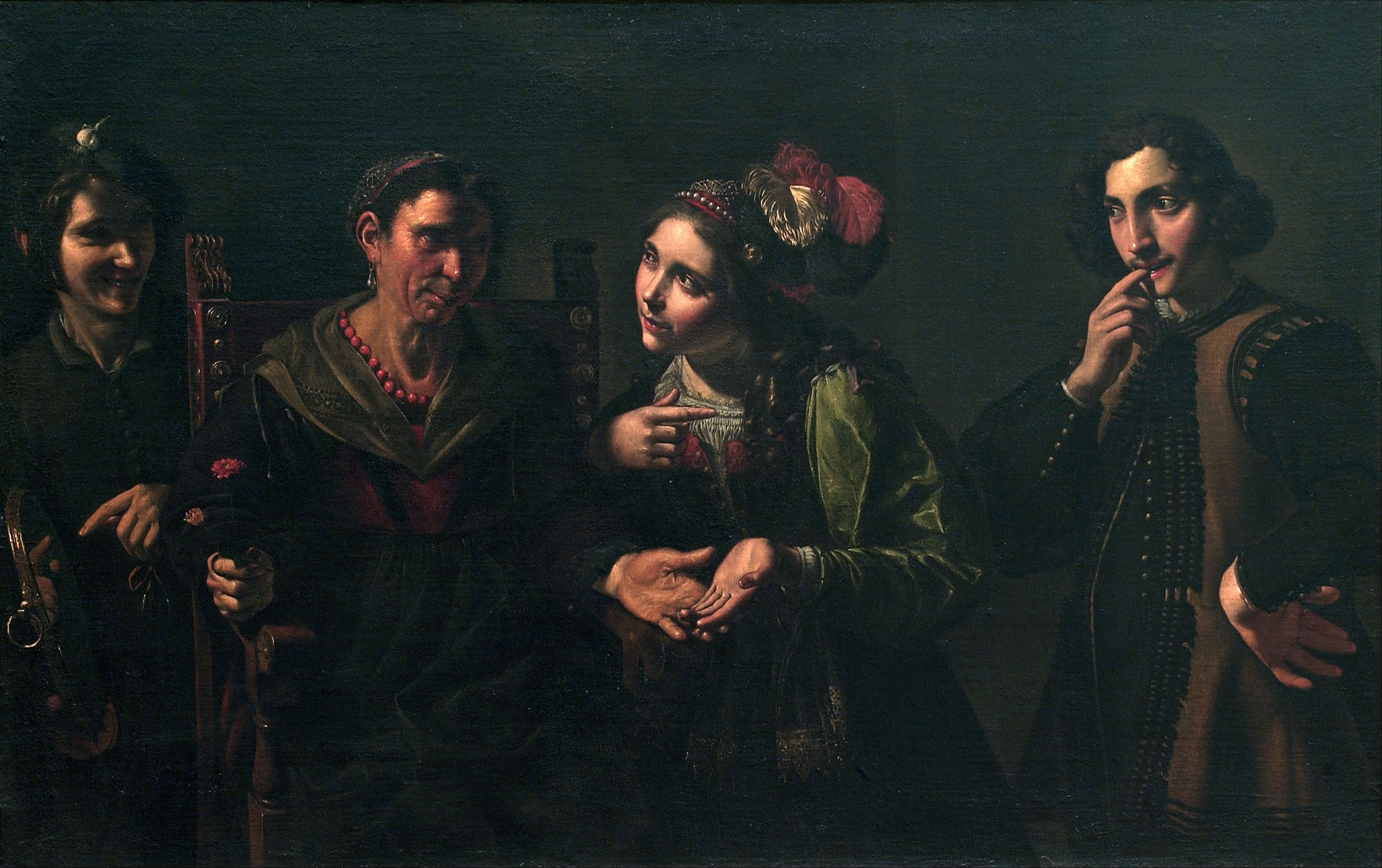
The Fortune Teller, c. 1630, Auckland Art Gallery

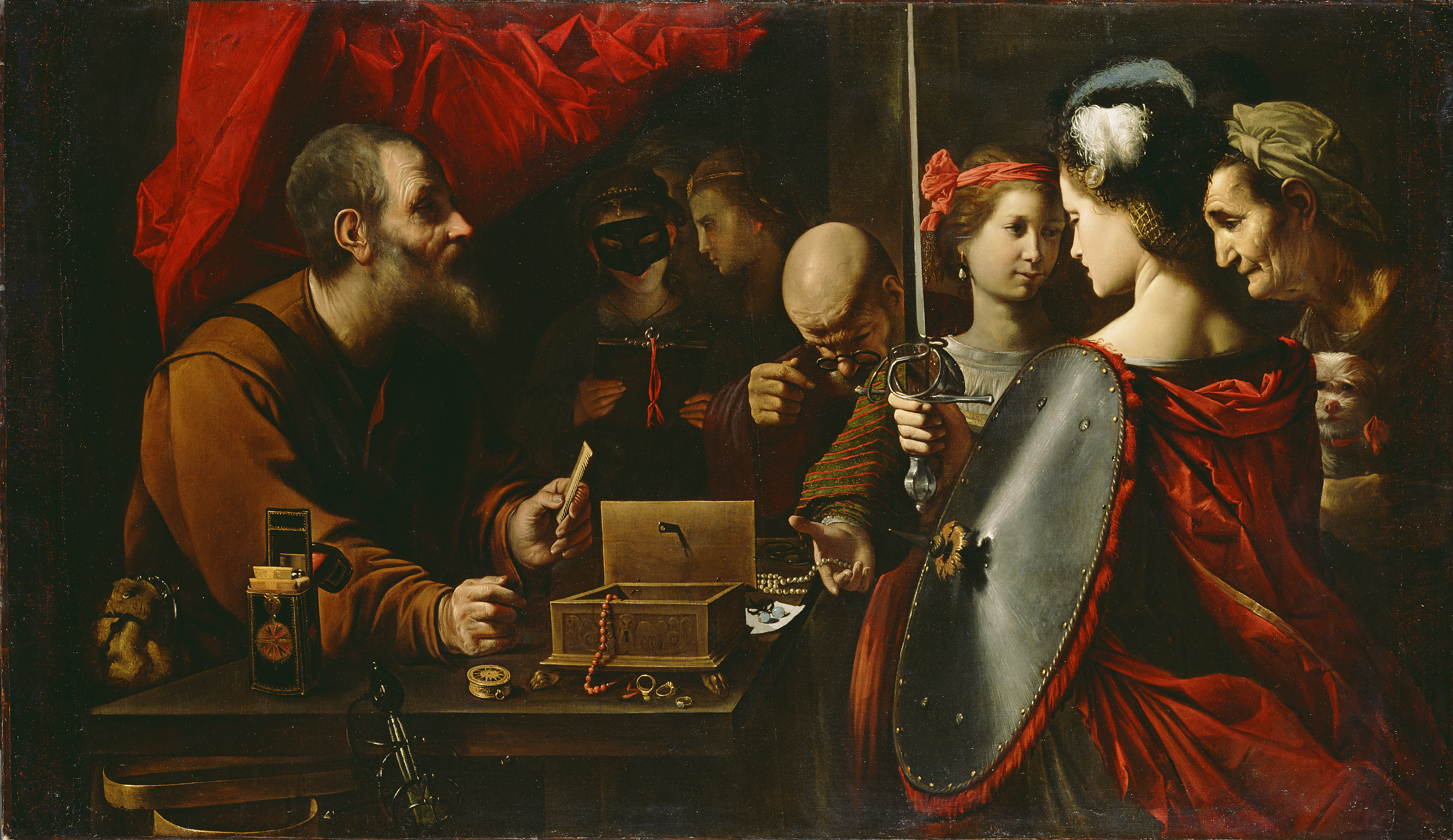
Achilles among the Daughters of Lycomedes, c. 1630, Getty Center, Los Angeles

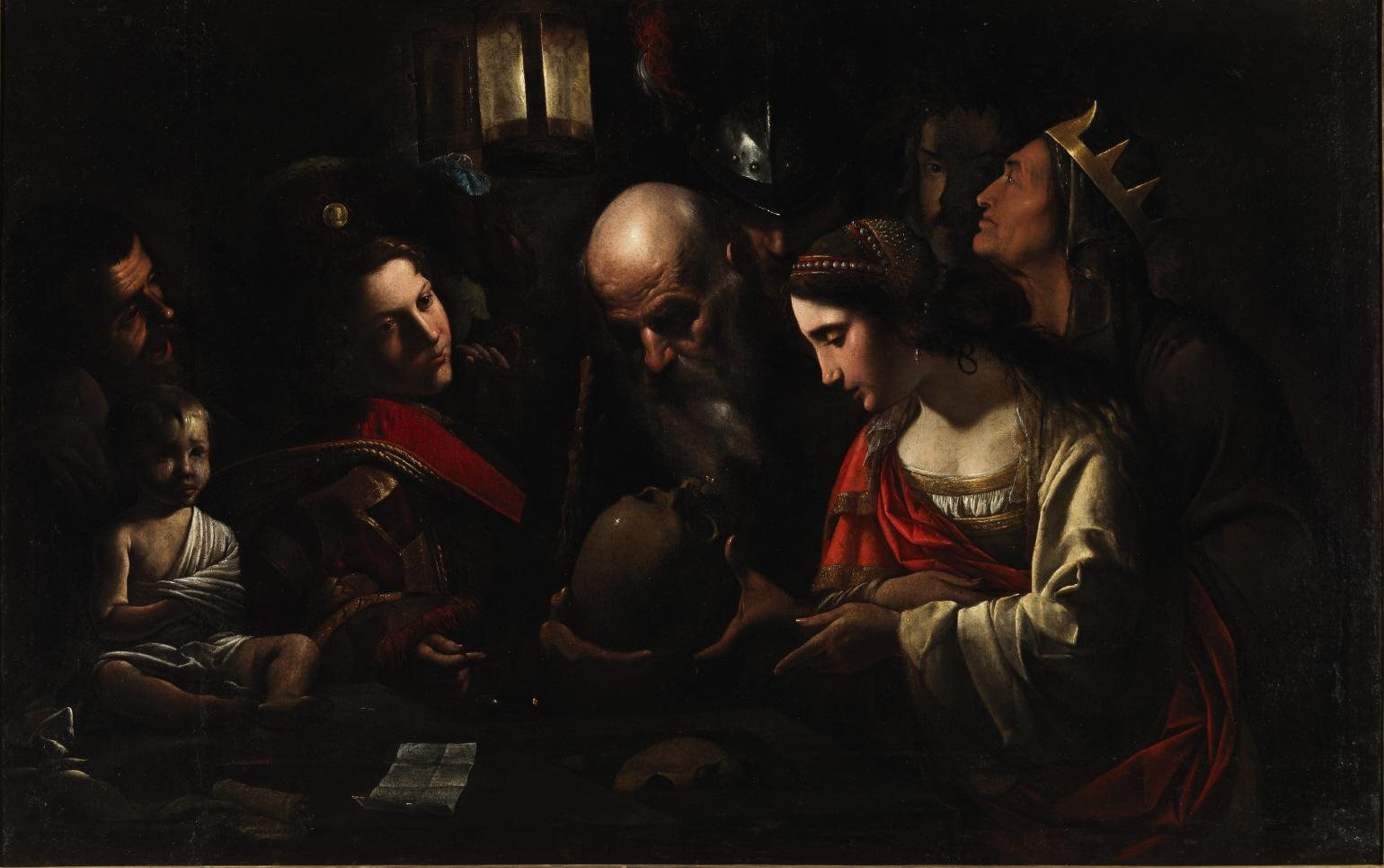
Allegory of Death, c. 1640, Cerralbo Museum, Madrid

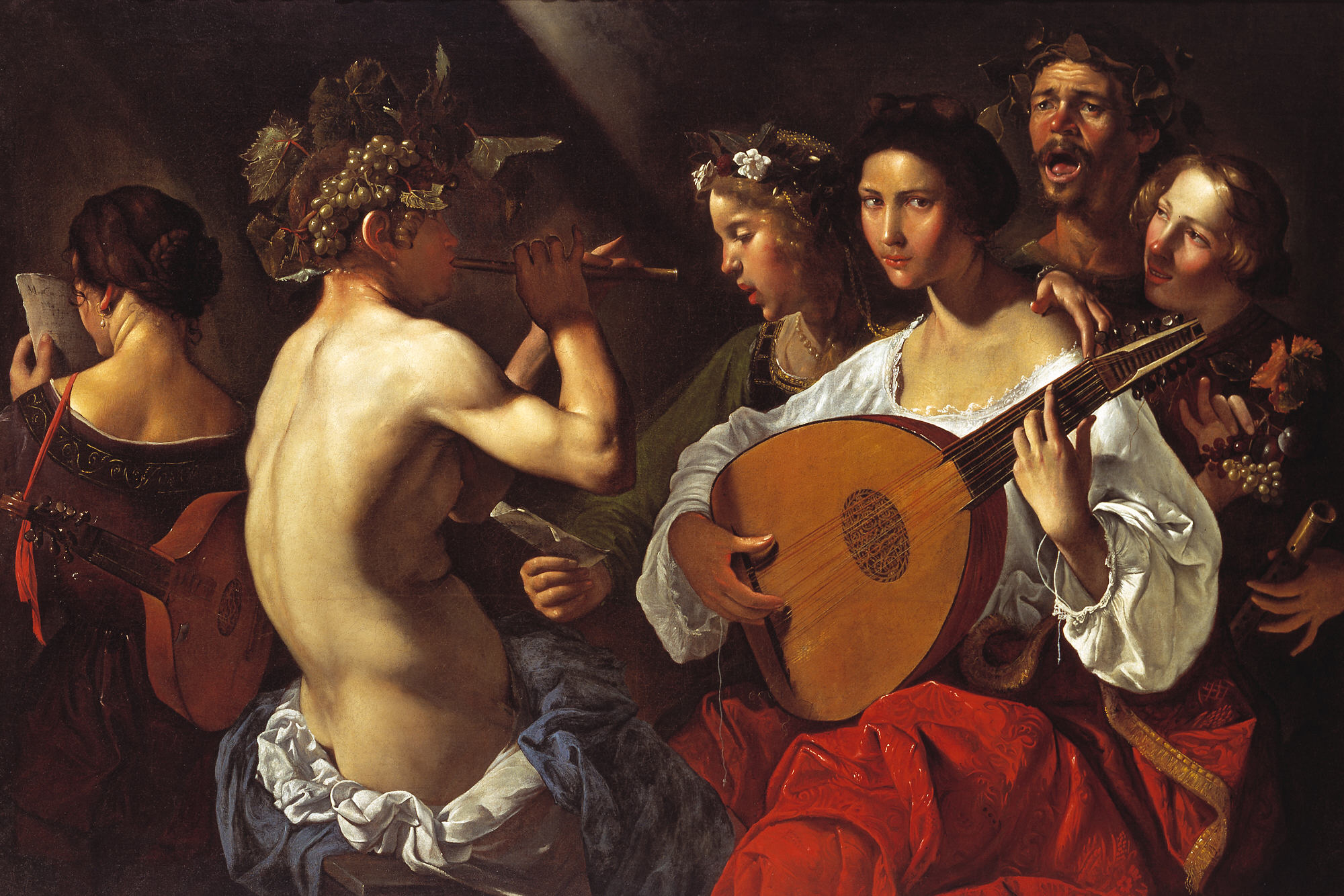
Bacchic Concert, 1625, Dallas Museum of Art

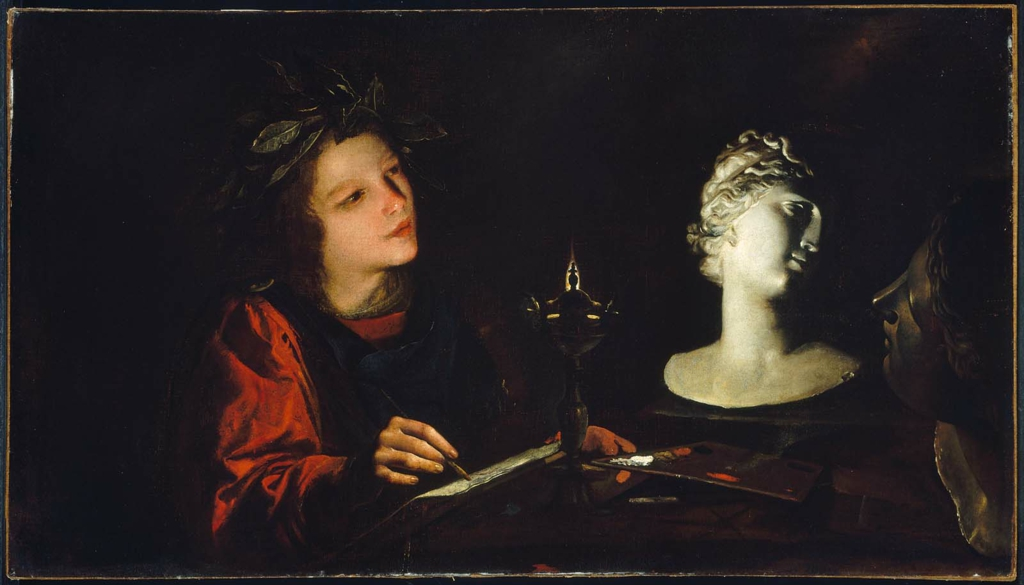
Young artist by the light of a lamp, c. 1625, Museum of Fine Arts, Boston

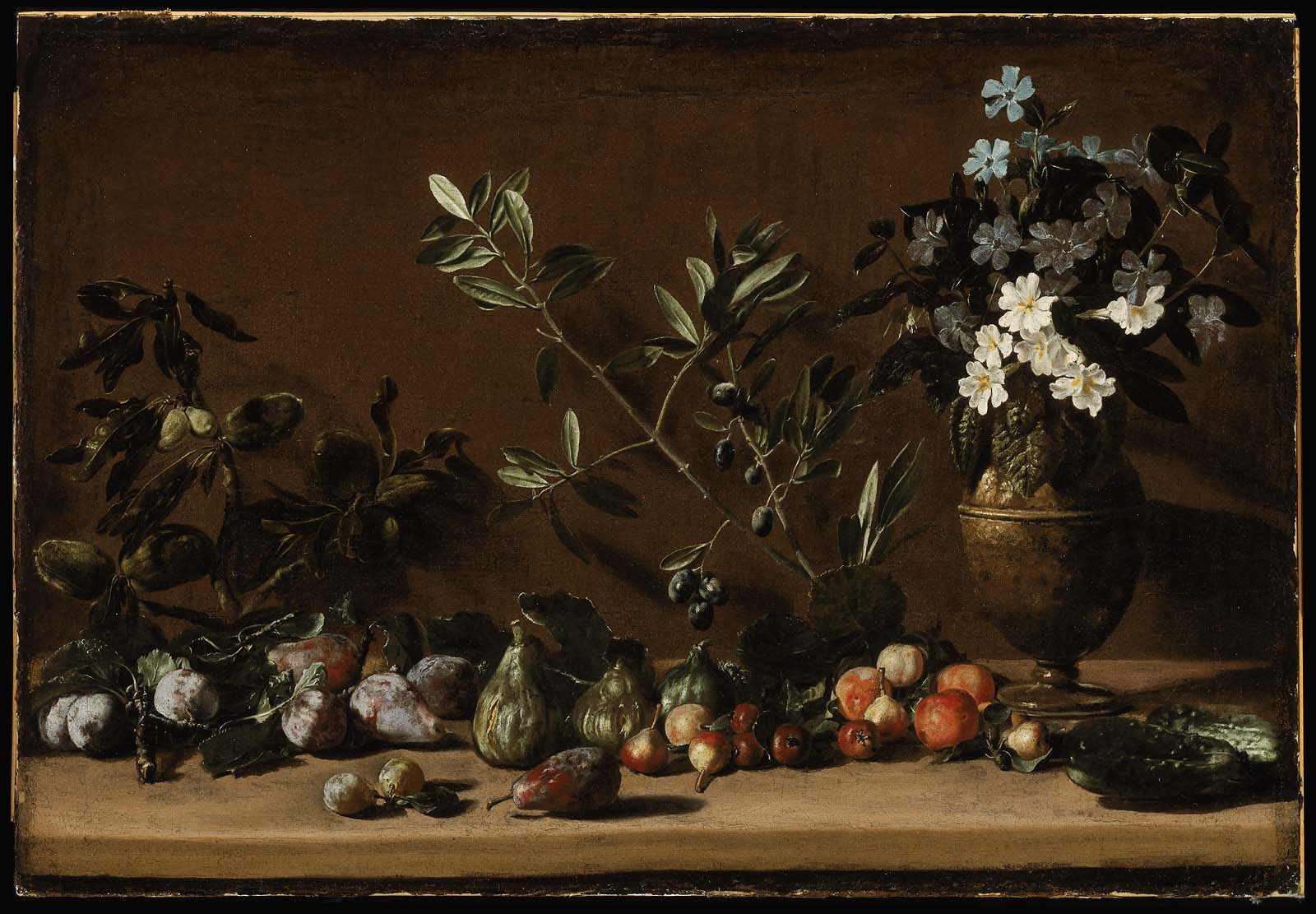
Fruit and Vase of Flowers on a Ledge, Museum of Fine Arts, Boston

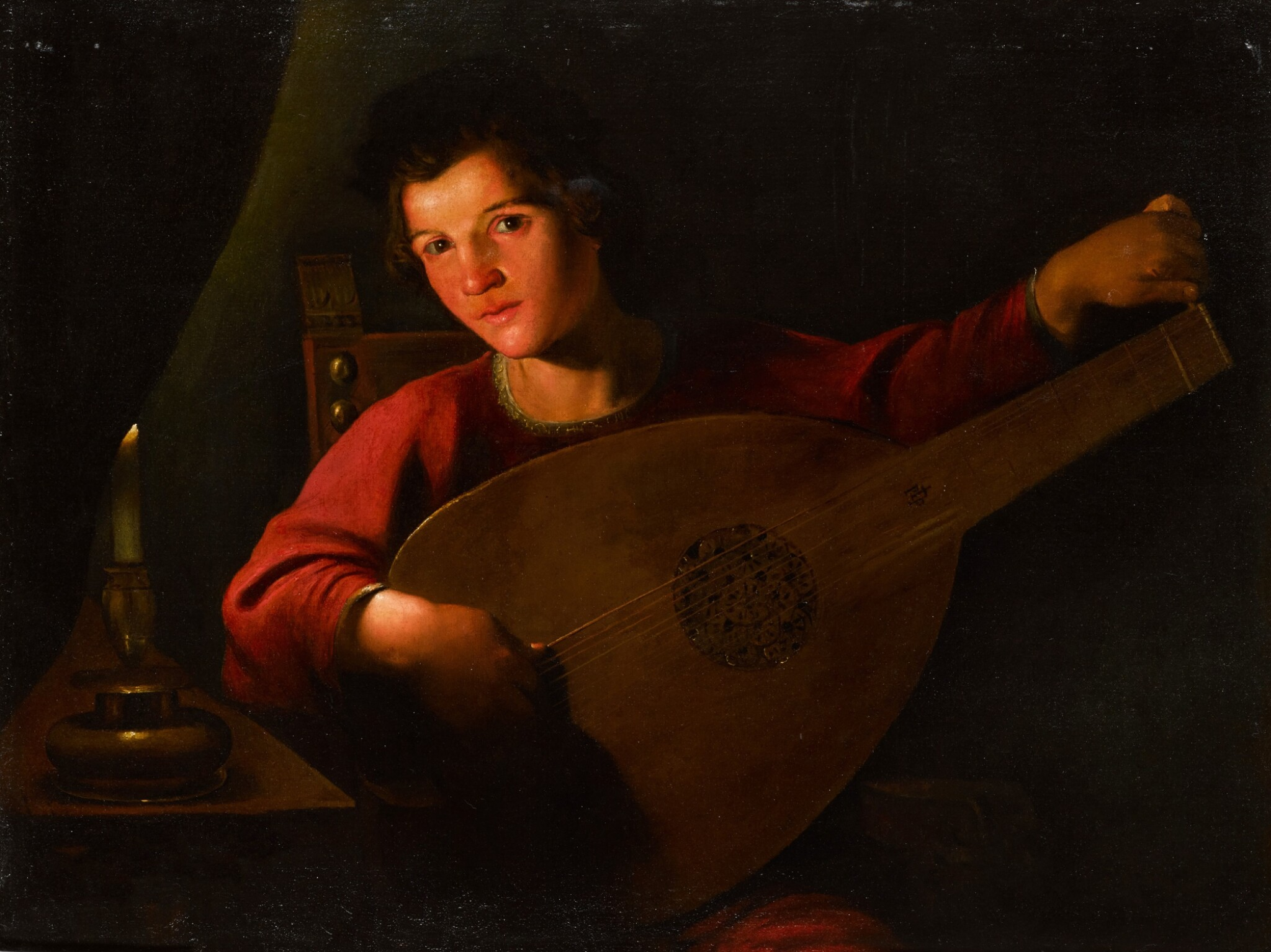
Young man playing a lute by candlelight, priv. col.

== Bibliography ==
- Media related to Pietro Paolini at Wikimedia Commons
- Giffi, Elisabetta (2014). "PAOLINI, Pietro". Dizionario Biografico degli Italiani (in Italian). Vol. 81: Pansini–Pazienza. Rome: Istituto dell'Enciclopedia Italiana. ISBN 978-88-12-00032-6.
