= 1595 in art =

Events from the year 1595 in art.

== Paintings ==
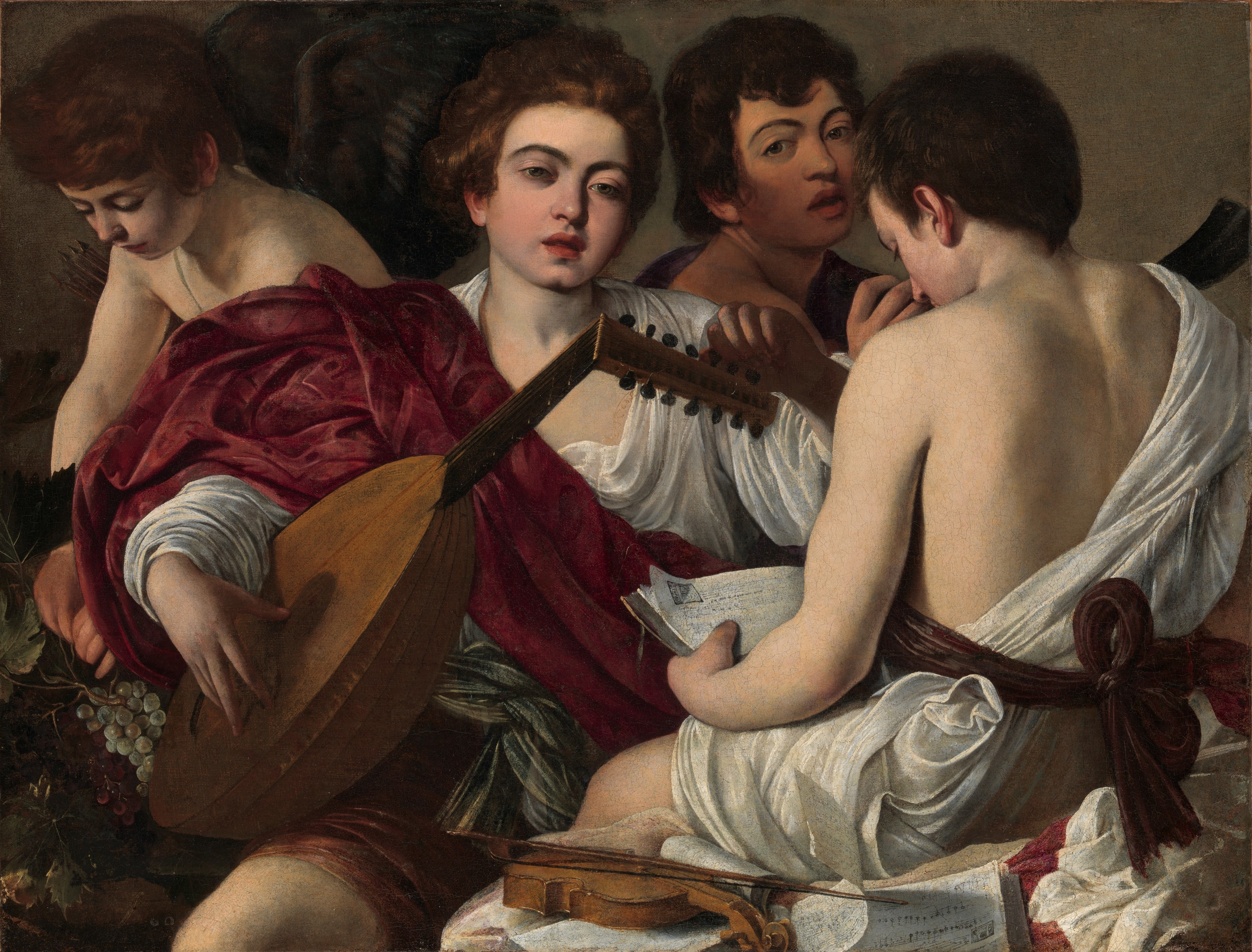
Caravaggio, The Musicians

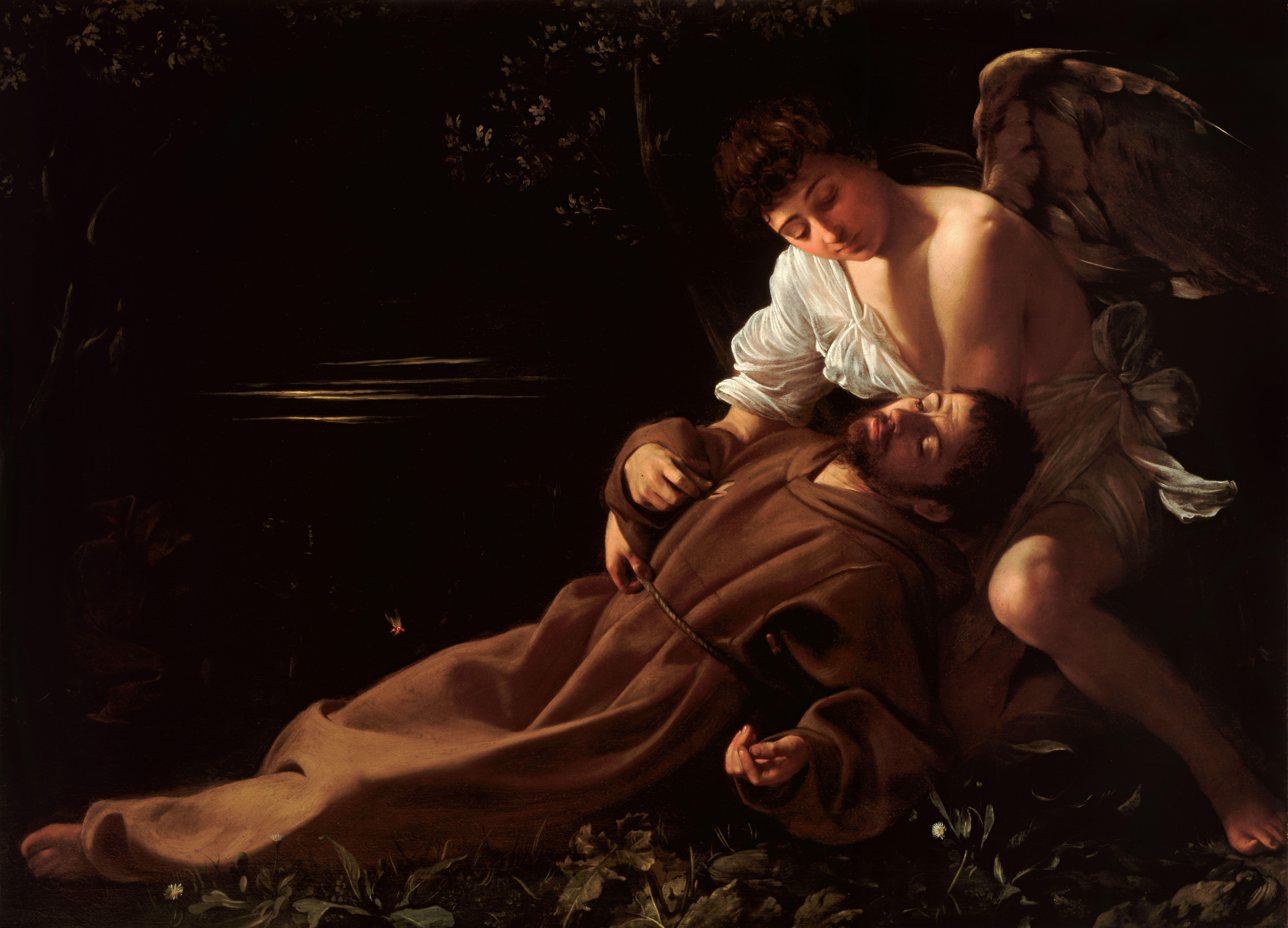
Caravaggio, Saint Francis of Assisi in Ecstasy

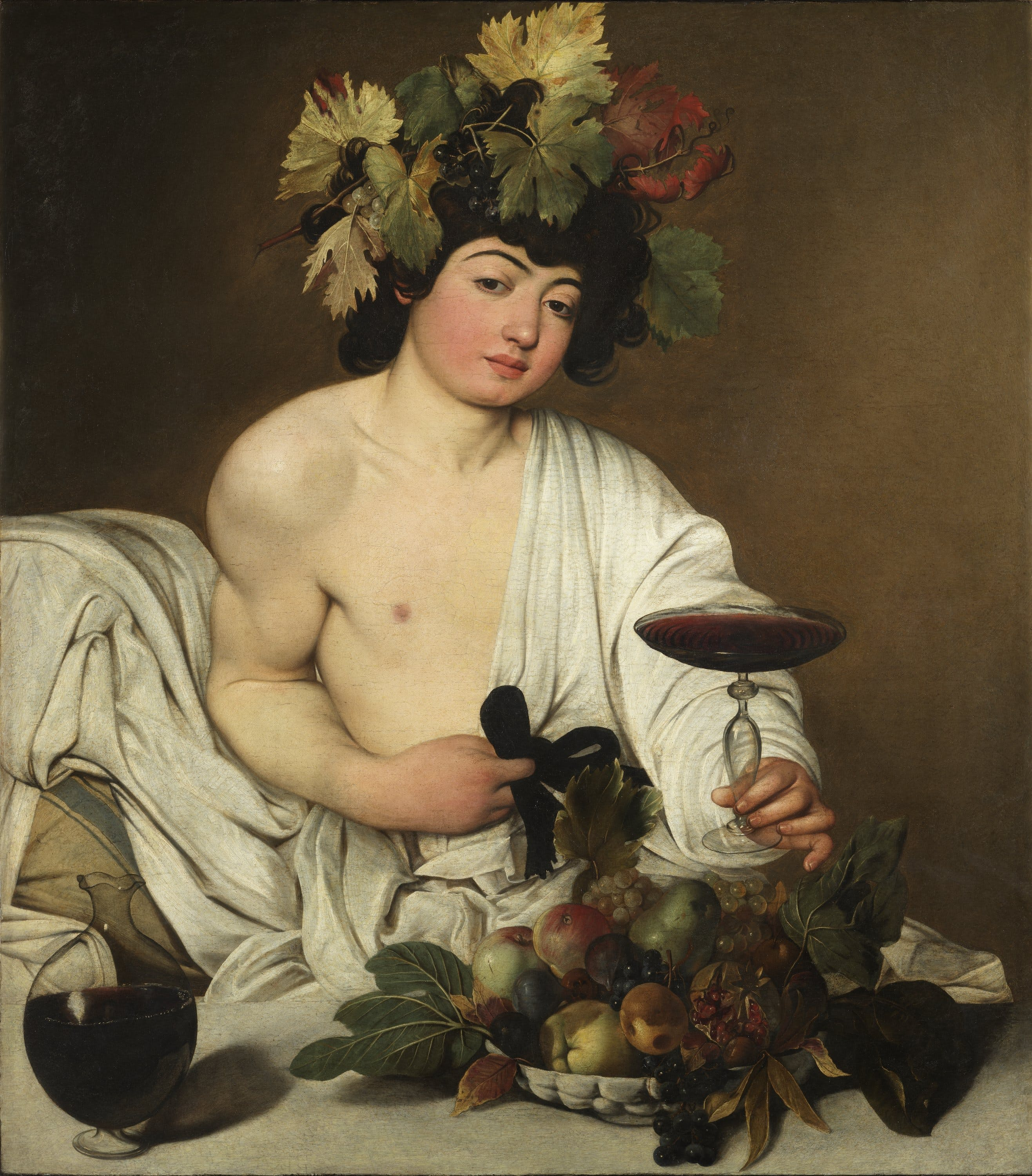
Caravaggio, Bacchus

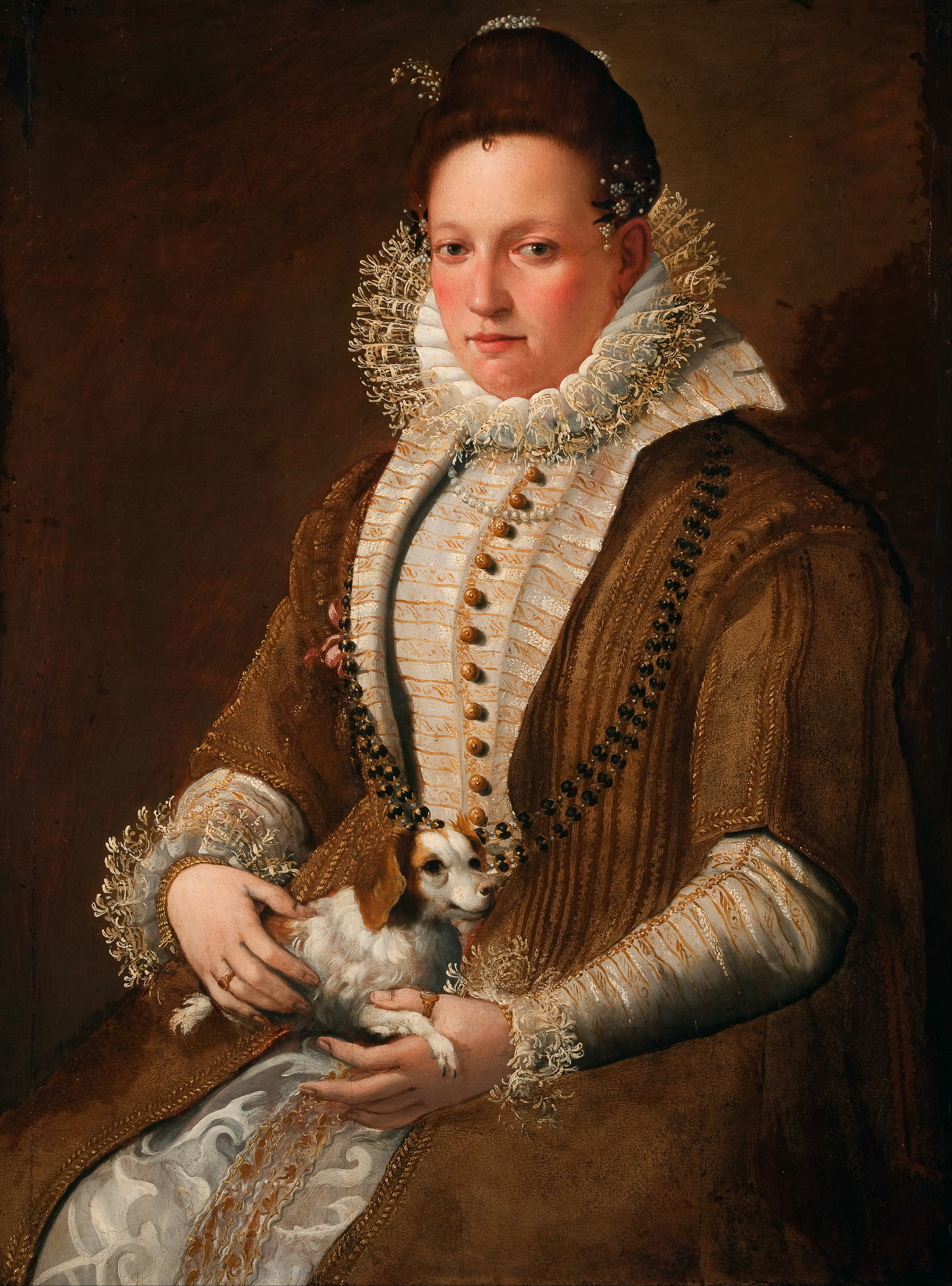
Lavinia Fontana, Portrait of a Lady with a Lap Dog
- Caravaggio
  - The Musicians
  - Saint Francis of Assisi in Ecstasy (approximate date)
  - Bacchus
- Annibale Carracci – Venus, Adonis and Cupid (approximate date)
- Lavinia Fontana – Portrait of a Lady with Lap Dog (approximate date)
- Marcus Gheeraerts the Younger (attributed) – Portrait of an unknown lady, possibly Lettice Knollys, Countess of Leicester (approximate date) (Tate Britain)
- Nicholas Hilliard – Portrait miniature of Lettice Knollys, Countess of Leicester (c.1590-1595)
- Fabrizio Santafede – Madonna with Saints

== Births ==
- April 6 - Pieter de Molijn, Dutch Golden Age painter and engraver born in England (died 1661)
- July 4 - Felix Castello, Spanish painter (died 1651)
- October 18 - Lucas van Uden, Flemish Baroque painter specializing in landscapes (died 1672)
- date unknown
  - Francesco Carracci, Italian painter and engraver (died 1622)
  - Lucas Vorsterman, Dutch Baroque engraver (died 1675)
- probable
  - Vincenzo Spisanelli, Italian painter of altarpieces (died 1662)
  - Tomás Yepes, Spanish painter of primarily bodegóns (died 1674)
  - Jan den Uyl, Dutch Golden Age painter of still lifes (died 1640)
  - Dirck van Baburen, Dutch painter (died 1624)
  - Pieter de Keyser, Dutch Golden Age sculptor and architect (died 1676)
  - Jan Wildens, Flemish Baroque painter and draughtsman specializing in landscapes (died 1653)
  - 1595/1596: Simon de Passe, Dutch royal engraver and designer of medals (died 1647)

== Deaths ==
- July 26 - Augustin Cranach, German painter, son of Lucas Cranach the Younger (born 1554)
- date unknown
  - Robert Adams, English architect, engraver and surveyor of buildings to Queen Elizabeth (born 1540)
  - Michelangelo Aliprandi, Italian painter, pupil of Veronese (born 1527)
  - Alessandro Ardente, Italian painter during the late-Renaissance period (date of birth unknown)
  - Annibale Caccavello, Italian sculptor (born 1515)
  - Jean Cousin the Younger, French painter, sculptor (born 1522)
  - Hernando de Ávila, Spanish painter and sculptor (born 1538)
  - Pedro de Bolduque, Spanish sculptor of Flemish origin (born 1550)
  - Étienne Delaune, French engraver and goldsmith (born 1518)
  - Ercole Procaccini the Elder, Italian painter (born 1520)
