= Chiara Matraini =

Italian Renaissance writer (1515–1604)

Chiara Matraini (1515–1604) was a poet and translator of the Italian Renaissance. Her many projects included genres that were uncommon for women writers of her time, such as an oration on the art of war, a translation from Latin into the vernacular, and several didactic religious texts. Matraini's writing demonstrates an eagerness to compose in an authoritative voice.

== Early life and marriage ==
Matraini was born in Lucca in 1515 to Agata Serantoni and Benedetto Matraini. Her father died the following year, and she grew up with her mother, her brothers Luiso and Ludovico, and her paternal uncle Rodolfo. Originally from the town of Matraia (from which they derived their name surname), Matraini's family were wealthy dyers of silk, and were also heavily involved in the politics of Lucca in the early sixteenth century. Her uncle Rodolfo was briefly made a senator in Lucca following the rivolta degli straccioni in 1531, but he was soon forced to retire from public office following a crackdown on those involved in this uprising. Her brother Ludovico was executed on 21 April 1532 for his involvement in the rivolta, while her other brother Luiso was imprisoned for the same offence, dying in prison in 1535. Other members of her family were forced into exile.

On 15 May 1531 Matraini married Vincenzo Cantarini, a member of another affluent family of artisans involved in the rivolta degli straccioni. In 1533 they had a son, Federigo. Vincenzo died in 1542 and as a widow Matraini was accused of maintaining an "academy" of young Pisan men in her home and of a romance with Bartolomeo Graziani, who was murdered by unidentified assailants.

== Literary activity ==
It is not yet known when Matraini began to compose poetry. The contemporary author Ortensio Lando referred to her as a "noble poet of Lucca" in 1552, but it was not until 1555 that her works reached the press. In that year her Rime e prose was printed in Lucca. This was primarily a book of songs in which Matraini defended the value of writing about (platonic) love and narrated her relationship with Graziani until the latter's violent death. However, it also contained Matraini's Oration on the art of war, which praised the virtue of defending one's homeland: an unusual subject for a female author in sixteenth-century Italy.

Matraini's Rime e prose was reprinted in Venice in 1556 and in the same year her Italian translation of To Demonicus by pseudo-Isocrates was printed in Lucca. Individual poems from her Rime were included in anthologies, such as the Delle rime di diversi eccellentissimi autori (Lucca, 1556) and Tito Giovanni Scandianese's La fenice (Venice, 1557).

In her later life, Matraini turned to more religious themes. Her Meditazioni spirituali were printed in 1581, her Considerazioni sopra i sette salmi penitenziali in 1586, her Breve discorso sulla Madonna in 1590, and her Dialoghi spirituali in 1602. A second edition of her Rime was printed in 1595, which contained additional poems and a collection of letters, and was heavily revised to match Matraini's new self-projection as a devout older woman.

Matraini's literary contacts included Lodovico Dolce, Benedetto Varchi, Ludovico Domenichi, and Cesare Coccapani: her correspondence with the last is preserved in MS 1547 of the State Archives of Lucca.

== Death and tomb ==
Matraini died in Lucca in November 1604. She was buried in a tomb in a chapel in the Church of Santa Maria Forisportam in Lucca, which she had ordered to be constructed for this purpose in 1576. The tomb featured a painting of Augustus and the Sibyl of Cumae, which was begun by Alessandro Ardenti and finished by Francesco Cellini, which is now found in the Museum of the Villa Guinigi in Lucca.

== Selected works ==
- Rime et prose, Lucca, Busdraghi, 1555.
- Orazione d'Isocrate, Florence, Torrentino, 1556.
- Meditationi spirituali, Lucca, Busdraghi, 1581.
- Lettere di madonna Chiara Matraini... con la prima e seconda parte delle sue rime, Venice, Nicolò Moretti, 1597.
- Dialoghi spirituali, Venice, Prati, 1602.
- Rime e lettere, edited by Giovanna Rabitti, Bologna, 1989.
- Brief discourse on the life and praises of the most blessed Virgin, in Who is Mary?, edited and translated by Susan Haskins, Chicago, 2008.
- Selected Poetry and Prose, edited and translated by Elaine Maclachlan, Chicago, 2008.

== See also ==
- Renaissance Literature
- 16th century in poetry
- 16th century in literature
