= Venus and Adonis (Veronese, Madrid) =

Painting by Paolo Veronese

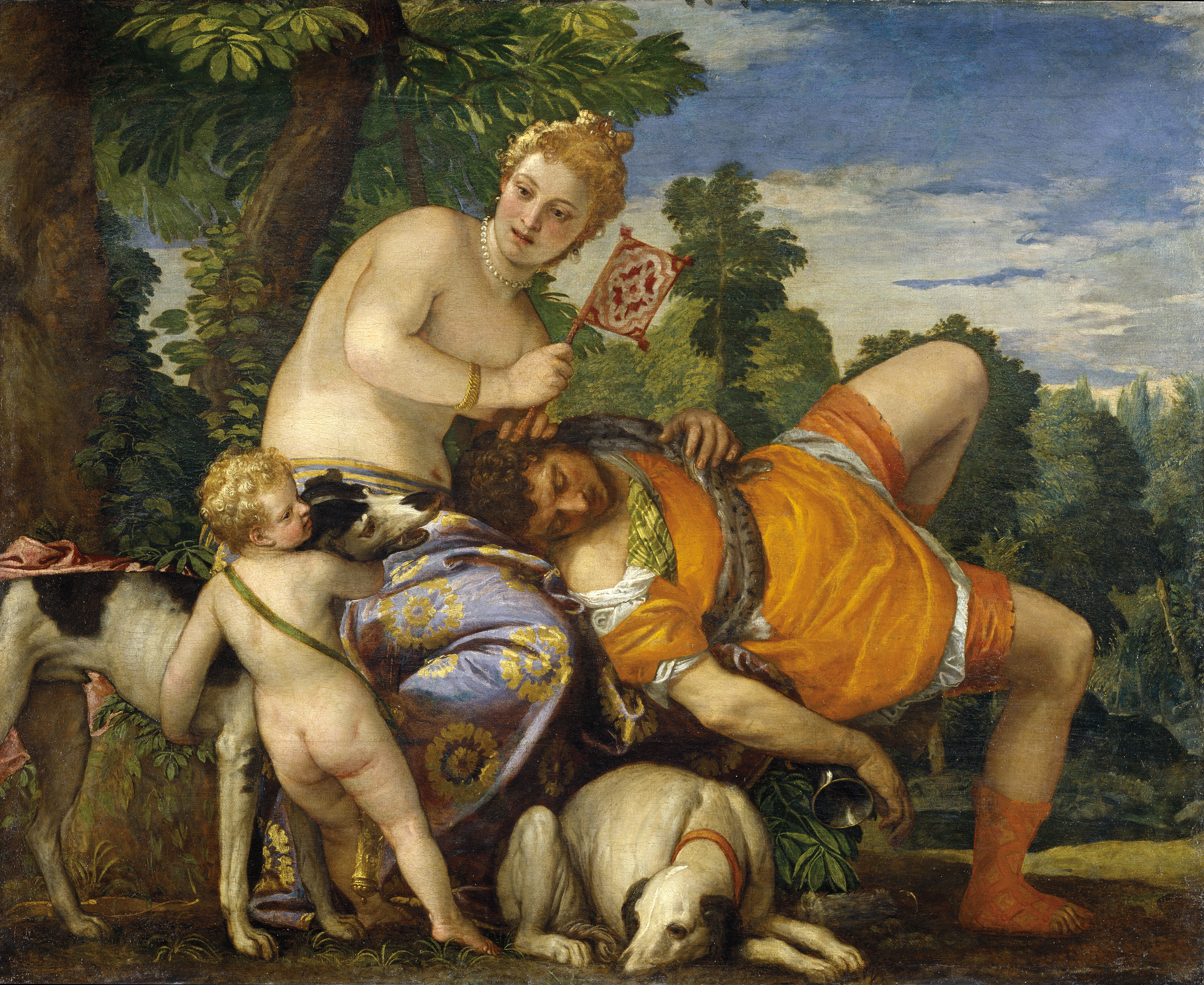
- Artist: Paolo Veronese
- Year: 1580s
- Medium: Oil on canvas
- Dimensions: 162 cm × 191 cm (64 in × 75 in)
- Location: Museo del Prado; Madrid

Venus and Adonis is a painting by the Italian late Mannerist artist Paolo Veronese, executed in the early 1580s, now in the Museo del Prado, in Madrid.

It is an oil on canvas and its dimensions are 162 cm × 191 cm (64 in × 75 in). The original painting was enlarged by 50 cm in the upper border in the 18th century. This added section was removed in a restoration in 1988, so the work recovered its original horizontal format.

== Subject and context ==
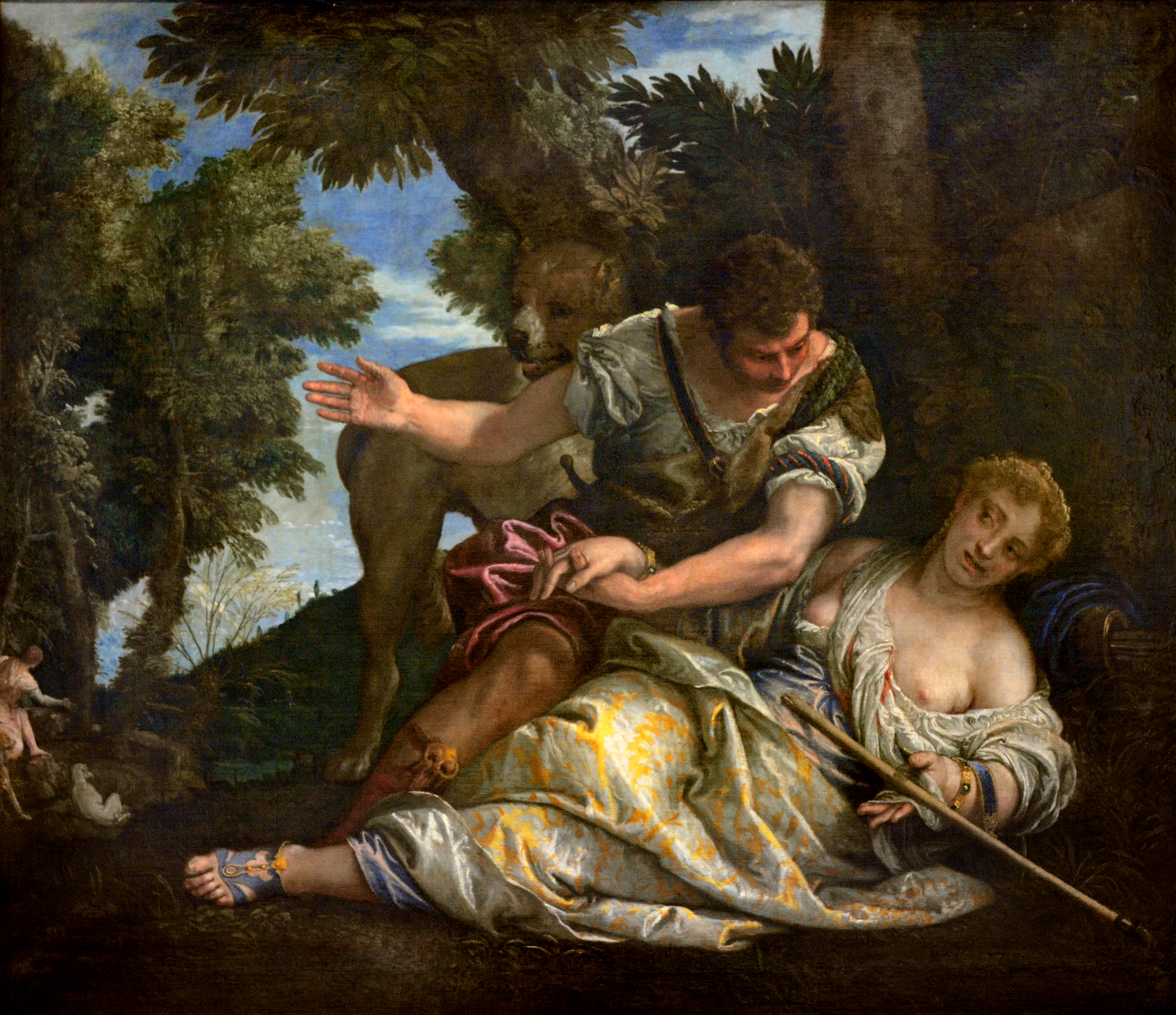
The pendant: Cephalus and Procris, Museum of Fine Arts of Strasbourg

The painting's subject is taken from Metamorphoses, a narrative poem by the Roman poet Ovid. It portrays the hunter Adonis sleeping in Venus' lap. In front of her is her son Cupid, with a sighthound. Cupid is portrayed while trying to quench the dog's desire to hunt, as Venus had forecast that Adonis would die during a hunt. In the background is a lively green landscape, with a vivid blue sky. The painting was executed after Veronese had spent a period in Rome. He modelled his Cupid on the Hellenistic sculpture of a boy with a goose, while Adonis may be modelled on an illustration of Endymion on a Roman sarcophagus in the Archbasilica of Saint John Lateran.

The pendant of this painting, also created by Veronese in the same period, is Cephalus and Procris. It portrays another tragic couple from Metamorphoses, and is now in the Museum of Fine Arts of Strasbourg.

== Provenance ==
The pendant Cephalus and Procris belonged to the Spanish royal collection from 1641, when Diego Velázquez bought it in Venice, until at least 1809. It was one of the paintings taken from the collection by Joseph Bonaparte during his brief rule of Spain. It was sold several times after his death and finally bought for the Strasbourg museum by Wilhelm von Bode in Berlin in 1912.

Venus and Adonis may also have been bought in 1641, with its pair. It was at any rate in the Spanish royal collection by at least 1666, in the "Mid-day Gallery" of the Alcázar of Madrid. After this burnt down in 1734, it is recorded in different rooms in the New Royal Palace of Madrid (on the same site) between 1772 and 1818, before most of the collection was transferred to the Prado.

== See also ==
- Venus and Adonis by Titian
- Venus, Adonis and Cupid (c. 1595) by Annibale Carracci
