= Cephalus and Procris =

Painting by Paolo Veronese

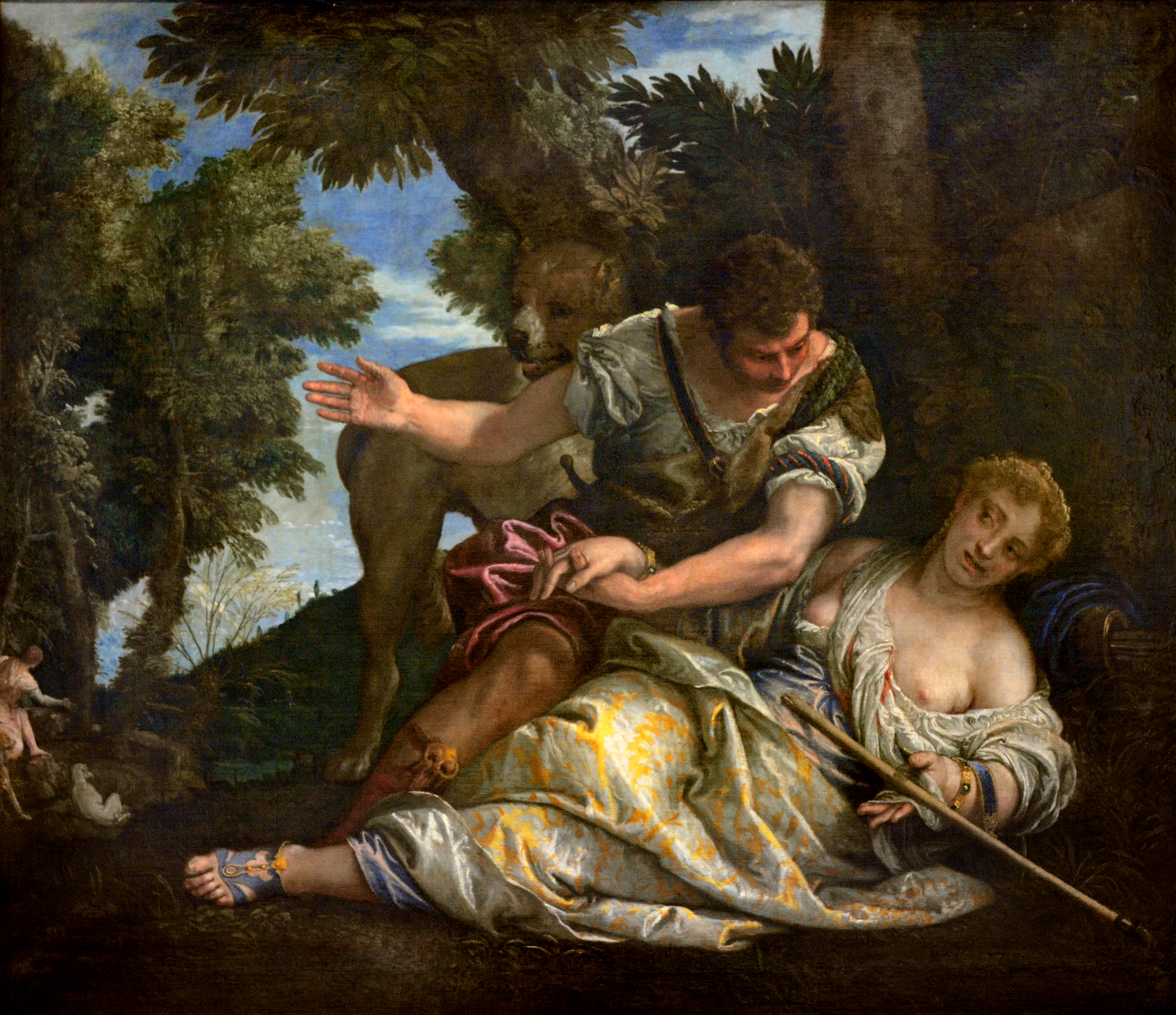
- Artist: Paolo Veronese
- Year: between 1580 and 1584
- Medium: oil on canvas
- Movement: Italian Renaissance; Venetian painting Cinquecento
- Subject: Cephalus and Procris
- Dimensions: 162 cm × 185 cm (64 in × 73 in)
- Location: Musée des Beaux-Arts, Strasbourg
- Accession: 1912

Cephalus and Procis is a 1580s painting by the Italian Renaissance painter Paolo Veronese. It is on display in the Musée des Beaux-Arts of Strasbourg, France. Its inventory number is 634.

The exact dating of the painting is uncertain, although it was not begun before 1580 and not finished after 1584. Its dimensions have previously been given as 162 × 190 cm (64 × 75 in) but are most recently given as 162 × 185 cm (64 × 73 in).

The painting is the pendant of the Prado's Venus and Adonis. It is likewise a depiction of a tragic couple from Ovid's Metamorphoses: the painting depicts the moment where Procris expires, as her confused husband Cephalus tries both to understand her and to explain himself.

Cephalus and Procris belonged to the Spanish royal collection from 1641 (when Diego Velázquez bought it in Venice) until at least 1809. It was one of the paintings plundered from the collection by Joseph Bonaparte during his brief rule of Spain. It was sold several times after his death and finally bought for the museum by Wilhelm von Bode in Berlin in 1912.

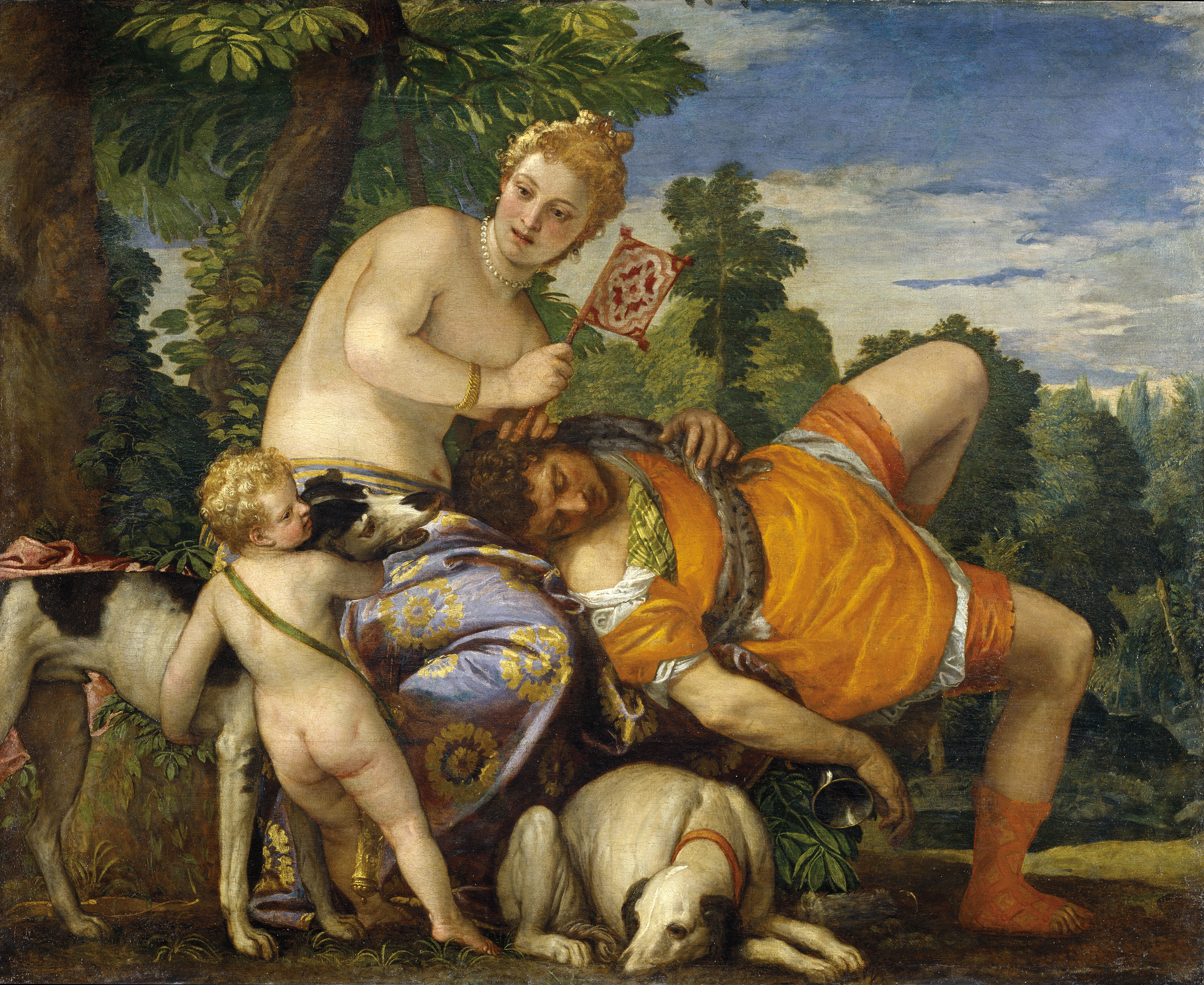
The pendant, Venus and Adonis, Prado
