= San Paolino, Lucca =

Minor basilica church in Lucca, Tuscany, Italy

Coordinates: 43.8427°N 10.5001°E

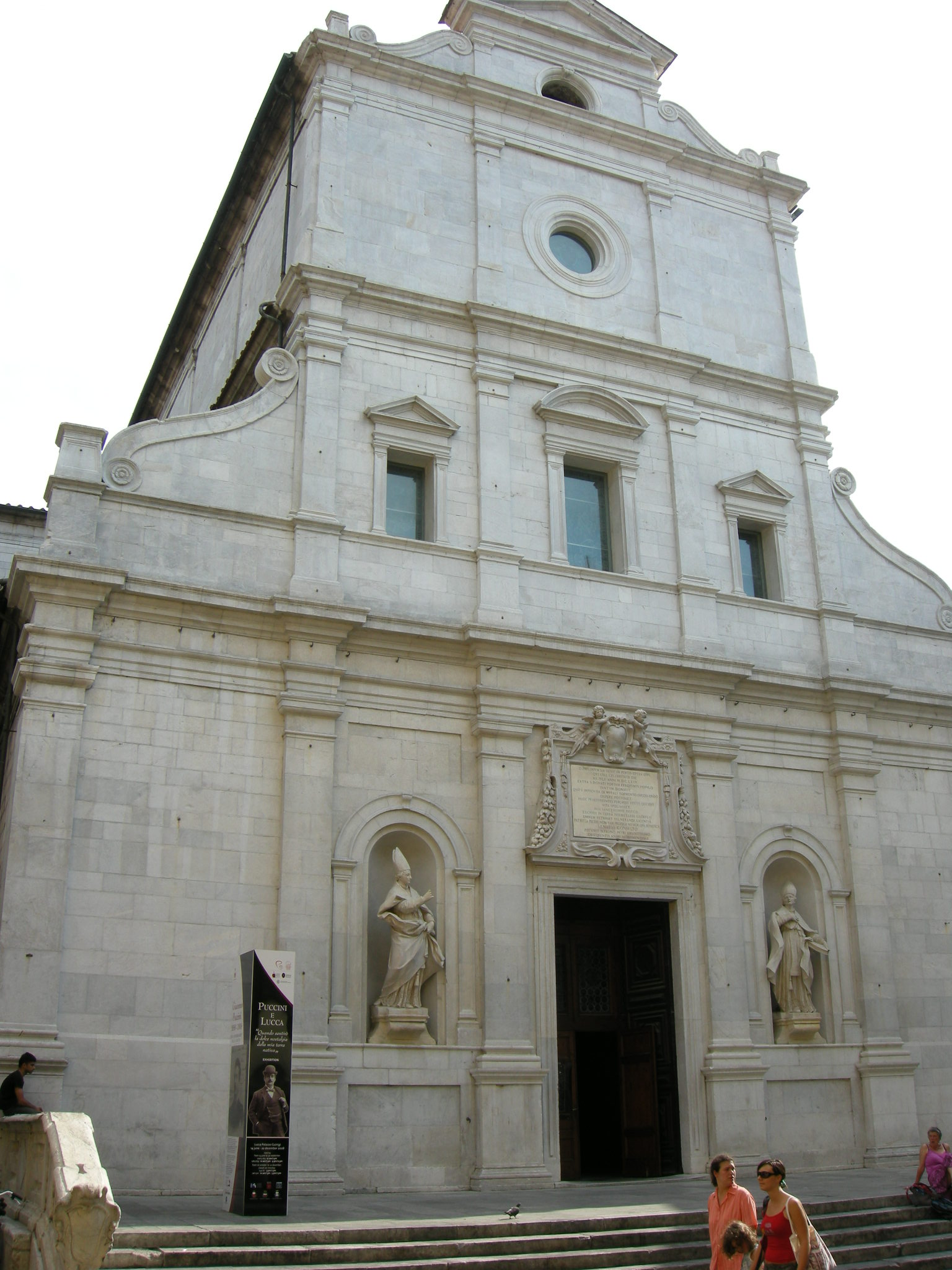
Facade of church

San Paolino or Santi Paolino e Donato is a Renaissance- style minor basilica church in Lucca, Tuscany, central Italy. It is dedicated to Saint Paulinus of Antioch, patron of the city.

== History ==
A church at the site was documented in 738, and named San Giorgio. After the year 1000, the church was rebuilt and dedicated to St Anthony. After 1261, the discovery of the relics of San Paolino, led to construction of a new church, in the process demolishing the adjacent church of San Donato. In 1515, the architect Baccio da Montelupo made the original designs for the present church, and these were completed by Bastiano Bertolani.

The entrance portal of the marble façade is flanked by niches containing statues (1710) of Saints Donato and Paolino. The interior has a marble choir by Vincenzo and Nicolao Civitali. The interior is richly frescoed.
