= Palazzo Guidiccioni =

16th-century palace in Lucca, Italy

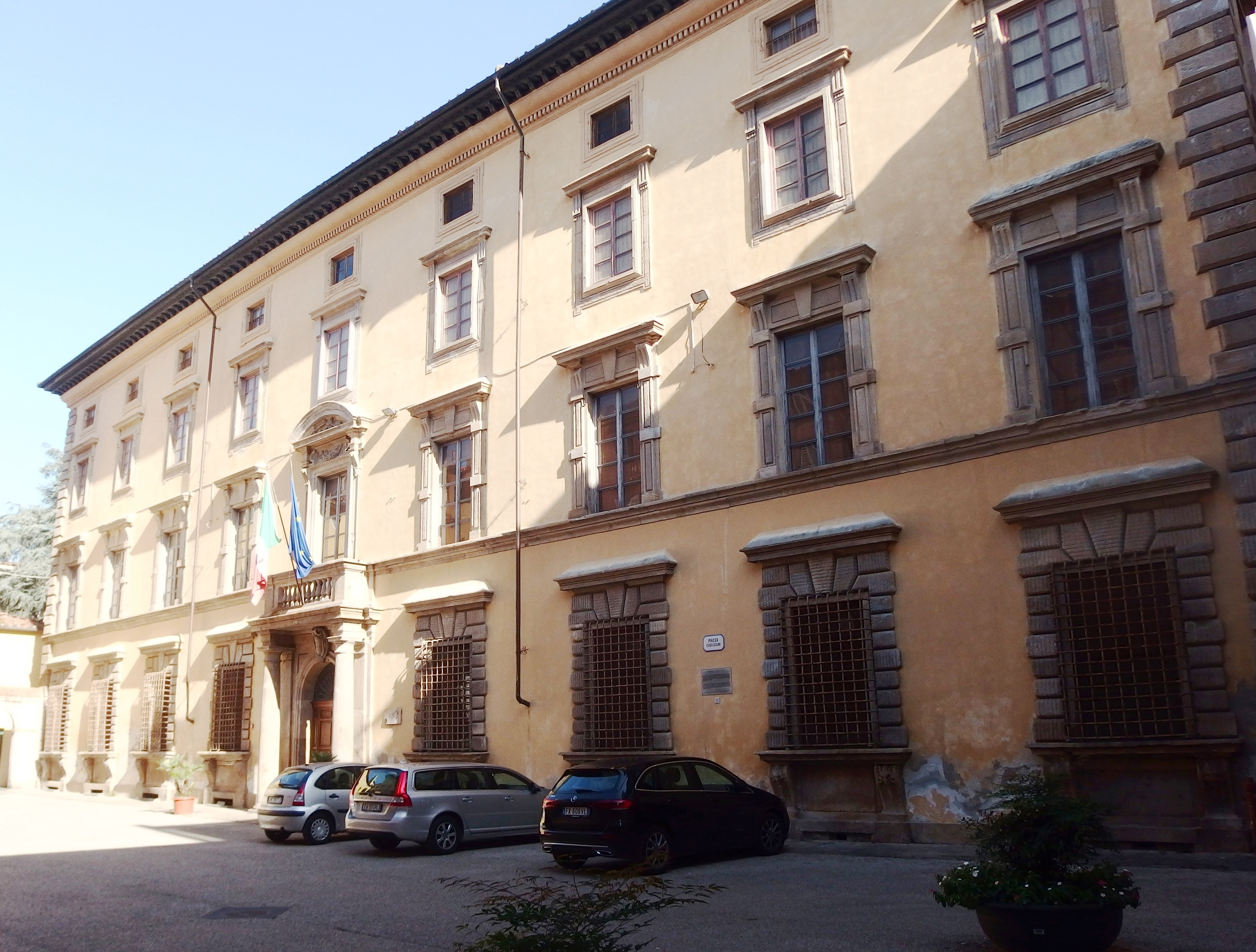
Palazzo Guidiccioni, Lucca, Italy

The Palazzo Guidiccioni is a 16th-century urban palace located in Lucca, region of Tuscany, Italy. The Guidiccioni had owned the site in the 8th century. Construction of the building we see today is attributed to Vincenzo Civitali. The palace was acquired by the government in 1822.

It houses the State Archives of Lucca.
