= Vincenzo Civitali =

Italian sculptor

Vincenzo Civitali (1523 - 1597) was an Italian Renaissance sculptor, jeweler, and architect, active in his native Lucca.

== Biography ==
He was the son of the sculptor and architect Nicolao, and the grandson of the sculptor Matteo. Vincenzo is said to have been sent to Rome to study there.

In Lucca, among the projects attributed to Vincenzo are the Funeral Monument to Guidiccioni in the church of San Francesco and being the sole builder of the Walls of Lucca. The Palazzo Guidiccioni of the same family is also attributed to him. He rebuilt the chapel of the Holiest Sacrament in the Lucca Cathedral.

He was dismissed from a role in building military fortifications by a disagreement with Francesco Paciotto in 1579. He moved to work with Alfonso II d'Este in Ferrara and was asked to design a fort in Monte Alfonso in Garfagnana. He resigned that post and moved in 1588 to help design the fortified walls of Lucca.
