= Boy Peeling Fruit =

Painting by Caravaggio

- Fanciullo che monda un pomo (Italian)
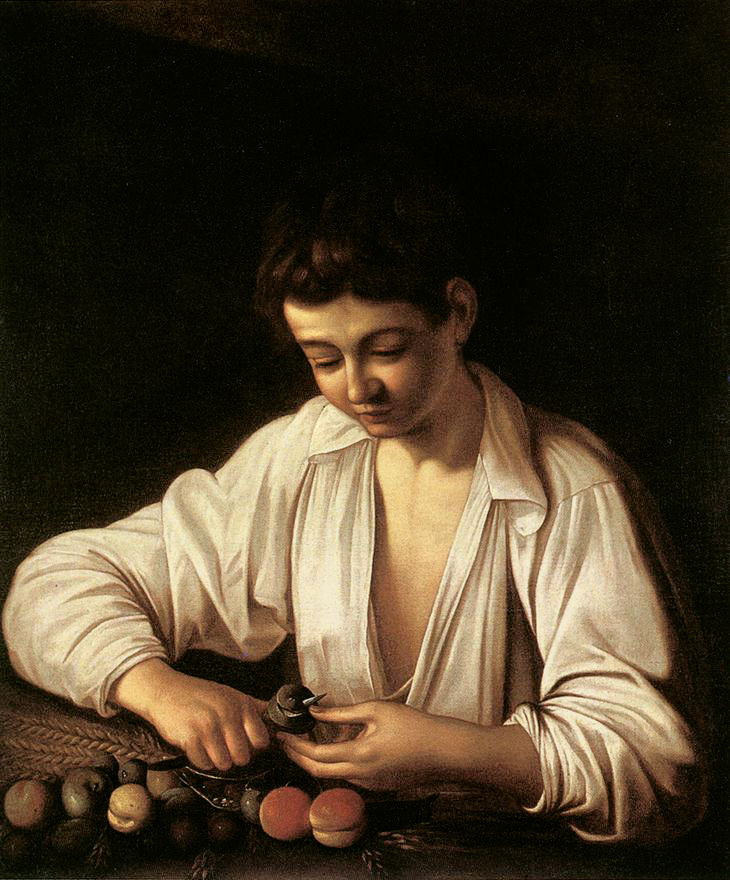
- Artist: Caravaggio
- Year: 1592–1593
- Medium: Oil on canvas
- Dimensions: 75.5 cm × 64.4 cm (29.7 in × 25.4 in)
- Location: Longhi Collection; Florence

Boy Peeling Fruit is a painting by the Italian Baroque master Michelangelo Merisi da Caravaggio (1571–1610) painted circa 1592–1593.

This is the earliest known work by Caravaggio, painted soon after his arrival in Rome from his native Milan in mid 1592. His movements in this period are not certain. According to his contemporary Giulio Mancini he stayed for a short time with Monsignor Pandulfo Pucci in the Palazzo Colonna, but disliked the way Pucci treated him and left after a few months. (Pucci fed his boarders exclusively on greens, and Caravaggio referred to him later as 'Monsignor Salad'). He copied religious pictures for Pucci, (none survive), and apparently did a few pieces of his own for personal sale, of which Boy Peeling a Fruit would be the only known example. The piece may also date from slightly later, when he was working for Giuseppe Cesari, the "cavaliere d'Arpino". As Caravaggio is said to have been painting only "flowers and fruit" for d'Arpino, this would again be a personal piece done for sale outside the workshop, but it was among the works seized from d'Alpino by Cardinal Scipione Borghese in 1607, together with two other early Caravaggios, the Young Sick Bacchus and the Boy with a Basket of Fruit. It is not known how these works came to be in Cesari's collection at the time.

The fruit being peeled by the boy is something of a mystery. Sources indicate it may be a pear, which is probably correct but has been questioned; it may be a nectarine or plum, several of which lie on the table, but these are not usually peeled; some have suggested a bergamot, a pear-shaped citrus fruit grown in Italy, but others object that the bergamot is sour and practically inedible.

Seen as a simple genre painting, it differs from most in that the boy is not 'rusticated,' that is, he is depicted as clean and well-dressed instead of as a 'cute' ragamuffin. An allegoric meaning behind the painting is plausible, given the complex Renaissance symbology of fruit. Caravaggio scholar John T. Spike has recently suggested that the boy demonstrates resistance to temptation by ignoring the sweeter fruits (fruits of sin) in favour of the bergamot, but no specific reading is widely accepted.

The model is thought to bear a resemblance to the angel in Caravaggio's Ecstasy of Saint Francis and to the boy dressed as Cupid on the far left in his Young Musicians, both about 1595 to 1597.

Several other versions of the work are known, all of which may be by Caravaggio; it has been suggested that at the early stage of his career, while he was still in the studio of Cavalier d'Arpino, Caravaggio's paintings were put in the studio's shop window, and if they attracted the attention of passing buyers, Caravaggio would feed the demand with additional versions. John Spike identified the likely original as a painting auctioned in London that year, although others have argued that either the Ishizuka version or that in the British Royal Collection could be the prototype. The version in the Royal Collection has been on display in the Cumberland Gallery of Hampton Court Palace since 2004. Other copies identified include models in private collections in Berlin and Rome.

== See also ==
List of paintings by Caravaggio

== Sources and references ==
- Caravaggio's fruit
- Caravaggio's secular paintings
- Peter Robb, M (1998) ISBN 0-312-27474-2ISBN 0-7475-4858-7
