= State Archives of Lucca =

State archival institution in Lucca, Italy

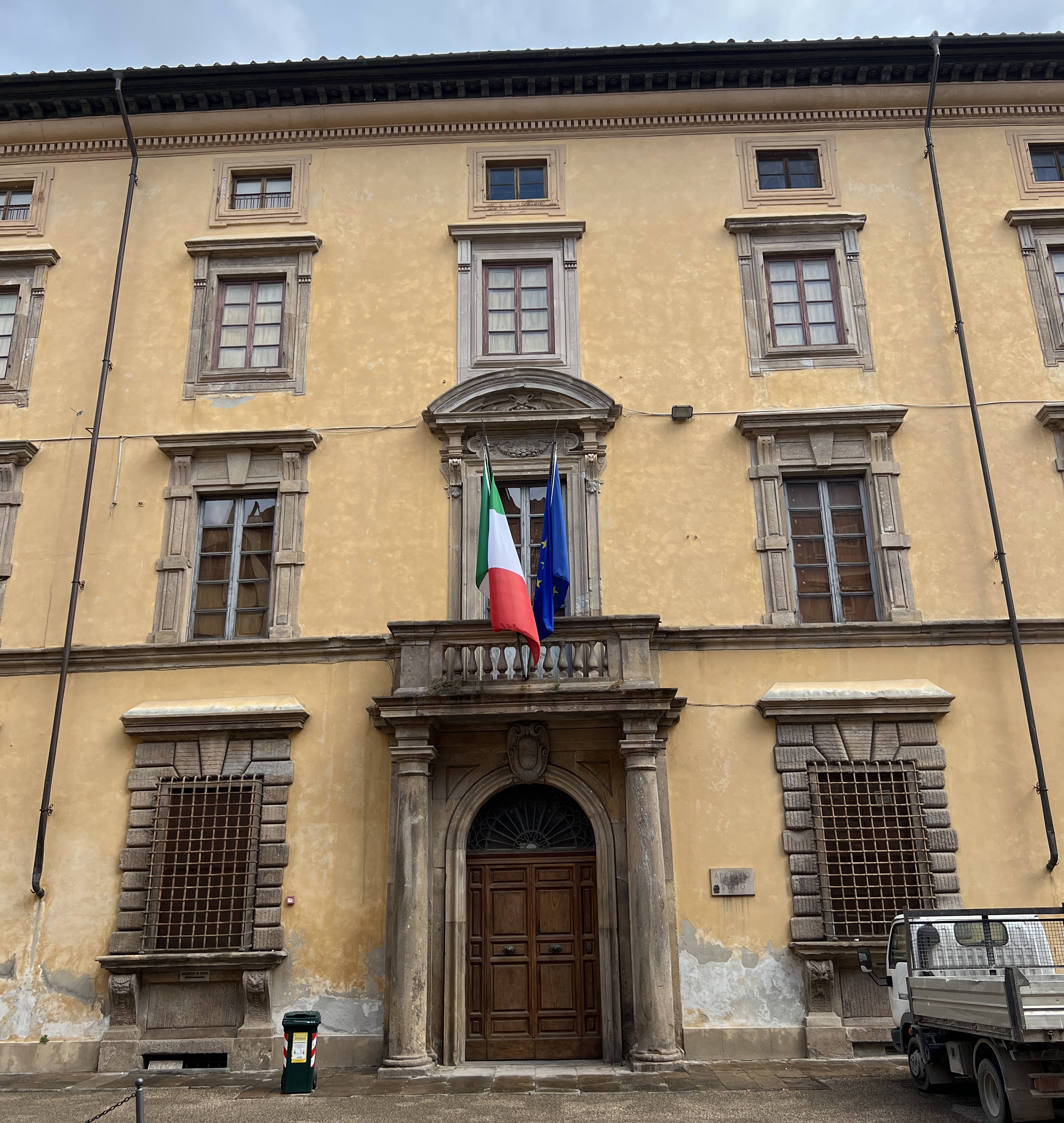
- Palazzo Guidiccioni
- Interactive map of State Archives of Lucca
- 43°50′38″N 10°30′17″E
- Location: Lucca, Tuscany, Italy
- Type: State archive
- Established: 1804
- Director: Maria Paola Bellini
- Website: http://www.archiviodistatoinlucca.beniculturali.it/

The State Archives of Lucca (Italian: Archivio di Stato di Lucca) is a state archive located in Lucca, Tuscany, Italy. It is a peripheral office of the Italian Ministry of Culture responsible for preserving historical records produced by state offices and other institutions in the province of Lucca.

Established in 1804 under the government of the Republic of Lucca, the archive preserves extensive documentary collections relating to the political, administrative, and judicial history of the city and its territory. The institute is particularly notable for the archival reorganisation carried out between 1872 and 1888 by the historian and archivist Salvatore Bongi, who systematically applied the "historical method" of archival arrangement, based on preserving the original order of records and reconstructing the institutional context of their production.

The archives are housed in the Palazzo Guidiccioni in Piazza Guidiccioni.

== Sources ==
- Maurizio Cassetti, ed. (2008). Repertorio del personale degli Archivi di Stato. Vol. I (1861–1918). Rome: Ministero per i beni e le attività culturali. ISBN 978-88-7125-294-0.
- Maurizio Cassetti, ed. (2012). Repertorio del personale degli Archivi di Stato. Vol. II (1919–1946). Rome: Ministero per i beni e le attività culturali. ISBN 978-88-7125-282-7.
