= Saint Francis of Assisi in Ecstasy (Caravaggio) =

Painting by Caravaggio

- San Francesco in estasi (Italian)
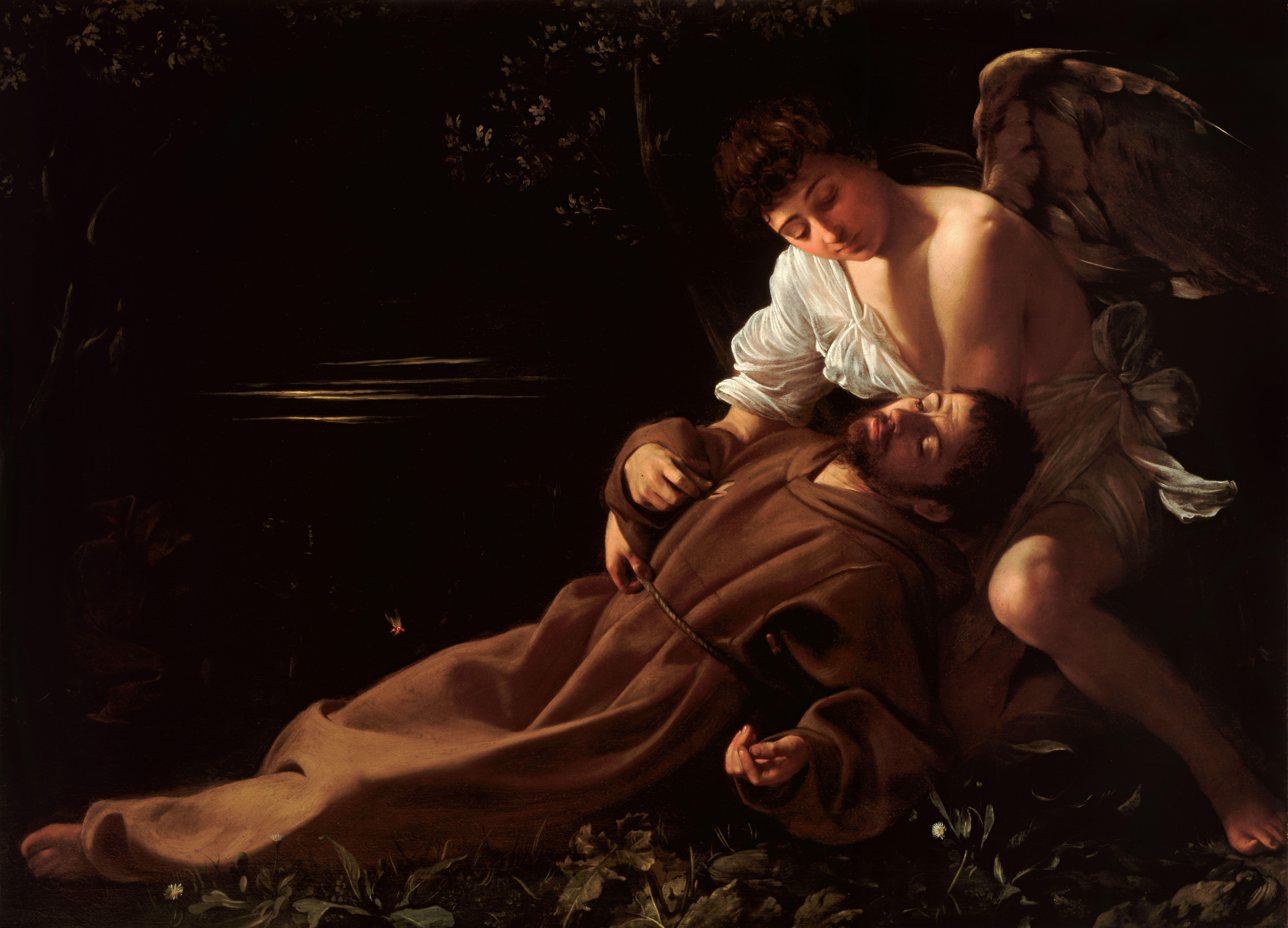
- Artist: Caravaggio
- Year: c. 1595
- Medium: Oil on canvas
- Dimensions: 92.5 cm × 127.8 cm (36.4 in × 50.3 in)
- Location: Wadsworth Atheneum; Hartford

Saint Francis of Assisi in Ecstasy (or The Ecstasy of Saint Francis) is an oil on canvas painting by the Italian Baroque master Michelangelo Merisi da Caravaggio, from c. 1595. It is held in the Wadsworth Atheneum, in Hartford, Connecticut.

== History and description ==
The painting was the first of Caravaggio's religious canvasses, and is thought to date from 1595, when he had recently entered the household of Cardinal Francesco Maria del Monte. It was presumably painted at the behest of del Monte, and is thought to be one of the first paintings done by the artist as "Del Monte's painter", as he is believed to have described himself over the next few years while living in Palazzo Madama. It shows Francis of Assisi (the Cardinal's name-saint) at the moment of receiving the signs of the Stigmata, the wounds left in Christ's body by the Crucifixion. The story is told by one of Francis' companions, Brother Leo. In 1224 Francis retired to the wilderness with a small number of his followers to contemplate God. On the mountainside at night Brother Leo saw a six-winged seraph (one of the higher Orders of angels) come down to Francis in answer to the saint's prayer that he might know both Christ's suffering and His love:

All of a sudden there was a dazzling light. It was as though the heavens were exploding and splashing forth all their glory in millions of waterfalls of colours and stars. And in the centre of that bright whirlpool was a core of blinding light that flashed down from the depths of the sky with terrifying speed until suddenly it stopped, motionless and sacred, above a pointed rock in front of Francis. It was a fiery figure with wings, nailed to a cross of fire. Two flaming wings rose straight upward, two others opened out horizontally, and two more covered the figure. And the wounds in the hands and feet and heart were blazing rays of blood. The sparkling features of the Being wore an expression of supernatural beauty and grief. It was the face of Jesus, and Jesus spoke. Then suddenly streams of fire and blood shot from His wounds and pierced the hands and feet of Francis with nails and his heart with the stab of a lance. As Francis uttered a mighty shout of joy and pain, the fiery image impressed itself into his body, as into a mirrored reflection of itself, with all its love, its beauty, and its grief. And it vanished within him. Another cry pierced the air. Then, with nails and wounds through his body, and with his soul and spirit aflame, Francis sank down, unconscious, in his blood.

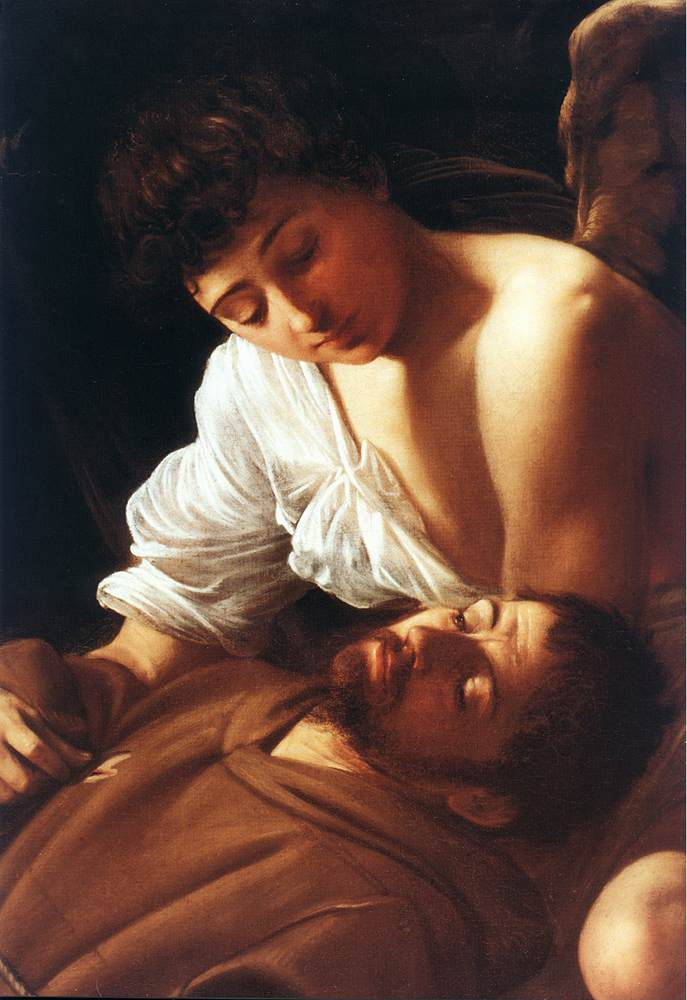
Saint Francis of Assisi in Ecstasy (detail).

Caravaggio's painting is less dramatic than the account given by Leo. The six-winged seraph is replaced by a two-winged angel, and there is none of the violent confrontation described by Leo – no streams of fire, no pools of blood, no shouts or fiery images of Christ. Just the gentle-seeming angel, bulking far larger than the unconscious saint, and Francis' companions in the middle distance, almost invisible in the darkness.

The subject had been a popular one ever since the 13th century: Giotto treated it about 1290, and Giovanni Bellini painted a famous version about 1480–85. Caravaggio's version is much more intimate and marks a sharp change of key: the saint, who has the features of del Monte, seems to sink back peacefully into the arms of a boy (who bears a marked resemblance to the boy in Boy Peeling a Fruit and to the winged Cupid on the far left of The Musicians, and even more to the boy being cheated in Cardsharps) wearing a sheet and some stage-prop wings. There is very little to indicate the subject beyond the saint's Franciscan robe – no sign of the Stigmata, or blood, except the wound in his heart, nor of the fearsome seraph. Yet the atmosphere remains genuinely spiritual, the two figures lit by an unearthly effulgence in the dark night-time landscape where strange glimmerings flicker on the horizon. The scene is at once real and unreal. Del Monte kept it till the end of his life, and several copies went into circulation and were greatly valued.

== See also ==
- List of paintings by Caravaggio
