= Nicolao Civitali =

Italian sculptor and architect

Nicolao Civitali (1482 - after 1560) was an Italian Renaissance sculptor and architect, active in his native Lucca. He was the son of the sculptor Matteo. His son, Vincenzo Civitali, was also a local engineer and architect.
