= Alessandro Ardente =

Italian painter

Alessandro Ardente (died 1595) was an Italian painter during the late-Renaissance period.

== Biography ==
Probably a native of Faenza, although sometimes thought to have been from Pisa or Lucca, he worked in a Mannerist style and enjoyed a long and prolific career. Ardenti’s earliest known work is a Nativity in the parish church at Antraccoli, near Lucca, signed Alexander Ardentius faventinus and dated 1539. Other extant dated paintings bearing the same signature are the Virgin and Child with Saints (1565; Lucca, San Paolino), the Madonna of Mercy (1565; Lucca, San Salvatore) and an Assumption (1567; Sesto, parish church). The signature Alexander Ardentius lucensis appears on a canvas depicting St. John the Baptist with St. Jerome and St Joseph in the parish church at Lunata, near Lucca. About 1572 Ardenti moved to Turin, where he was employed as a painter and sculptor to the House of Savoy, first by Duke Emanuel-Philibert and then by his successor Duke Charles-Emanuel I. Documents confirm Ardenti’s marriage in 1583 and a journey to Milan the following year. Ardente died in Turin on 20 August 1595. His widow and children received a pension after his death. While a noticeable hardness is evident in his work at Lucca, the Turin paintings reveal an affinity with the Roman school. Stylistic differences between some of the paintings possibly indicate the hands of two different artists, both named Alessandro Ardenti, perhaps a father and son.
