= The Musicians (Caravaggio) =

Painting by Caravaggio

- Concerto di giovani (Italian)
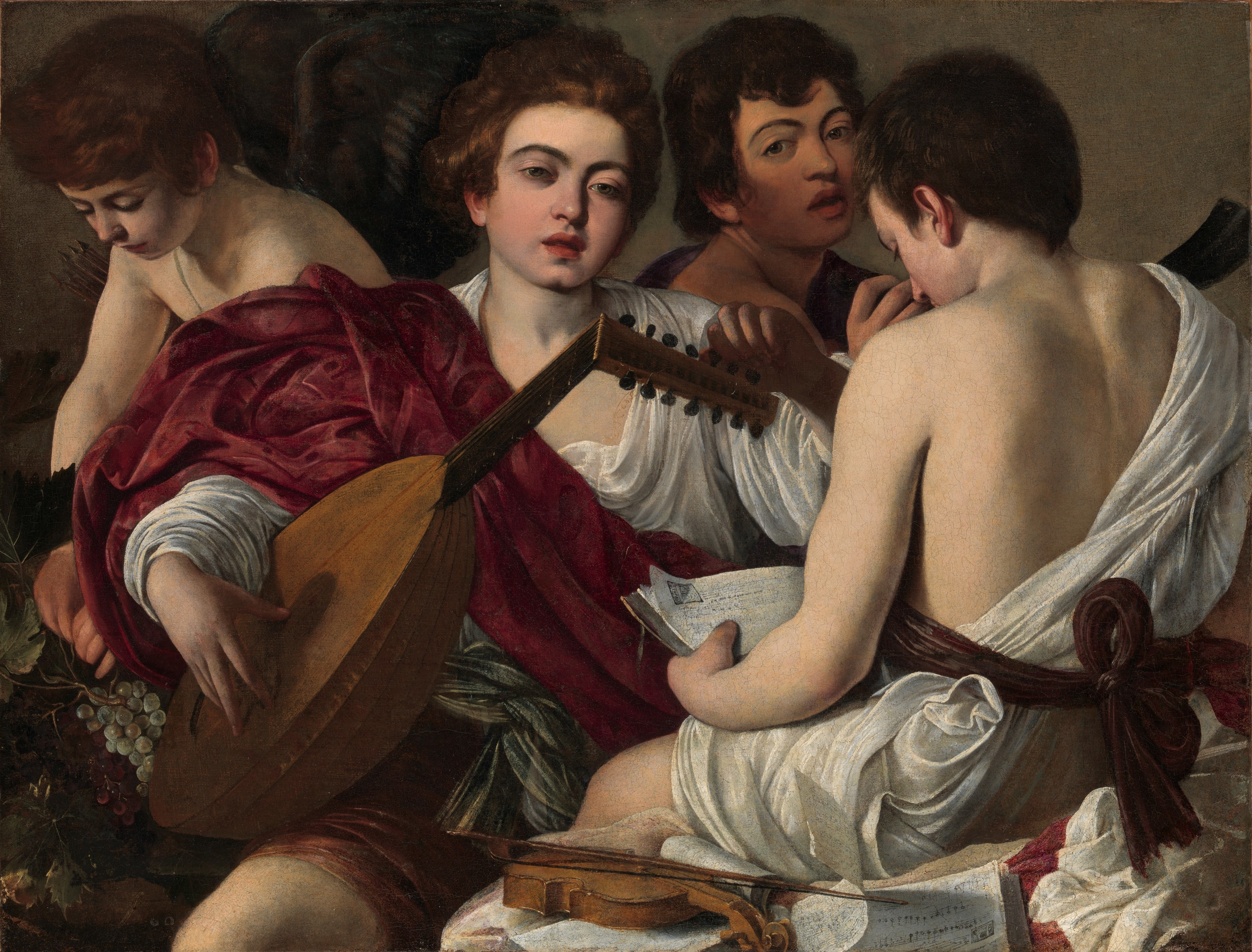
- Artist: Caravaggio
- Year: c. 1595; 431 years ago
- Medium: Oil on canvas
- Dimensions: 92 cm × 118.5 cm (36 in × 46.7 in)
- Location: Metropolitan Museum of Art, New York

The Musicians or Concert of Youths (c. 1595) is a painting by the Italian Baroque master Michelangelo Merisi da Caravaggio (1571–1610). The work was commissioned by Cardinal Francesco Maria del Monte, who had an avid interest in music. It is one of Caravaggio’s more complex paintings, with four figures that were likely painted from life.

== Patron ==
Caravaggio entered the household of Cardinal Francesco Maria del Monte sometime in 1595, and The Musicians is thought to have been his first painting done expressly for the Cardinal. His biographer, the painter Baglione, says he "painted for the Cardinal, youths playing music very well drawn from nature and also a youth playing a lute," the latter presumably being The Lute Player, which seems to form a companion-piece to The Musicians.

Cardinal del Monte owned various expensive musical instruments, which Caravaggio could use as models in his works for the wealthy patron.

Cardinal del Monte's impact on Caravaggio's artistic career during its early stages has been heavily studied due to his significant involvement as a supporter. Furthermore, his preference for particular artists, such as Andrea Sacchi, and active participation in the Accademia di San Luca are commonly recognized.

Del Monte's strong enthusiasm for music was viewed as a vital aspect of education for Renaissance individuals of high social status. According to a sixteenth-century manuscript detailing the life of a respected Italian nobleman and soldier, music was deemed necessary for aristocratic behavior. This would provide motivation for commissioning art and helping Caravaggio become immersed in the Baroque scene of music. The impact of del Monte's commissions would create an outlet for Caravaggio to gain first-hand experience in scenes often meant for the aristocracy to enjoy. Giving Caravaggio this perspective provided an accurate source for rendering and capturing the moods and emotions attached to the baroque movement and music.

=== Provenance ===
After Cardinal del Monte's death, this painting was sold on May 8, 1628 and changed hands a few more times before being inventoried in 1638 by Cardinal Richelieu and by the Duchesse d'Aiguillon in whose collection it remained until 1657. This painting disappeared at one point in time and the whereabouts were unknown. According to the catalog entry at the Metropolitan Museum of Art, New York, a museum benefactor, Jacob S. Rogers purchased it from a house sale in 1952.

It is now held in the Metropolitan Museum of Art, New York, where it has been since 1952. It underwent extensive restoration in 1983.

== Description and interpretations ==
The picture displays four boys in classical costume (Greek or Roman robes): three figures playing various musical instruments or singing and the fourth dressed as Cupid and reaching towards some grapes. The picture is an allegory relating music to the sustenance of love in the same way that food is the sustenance of life.

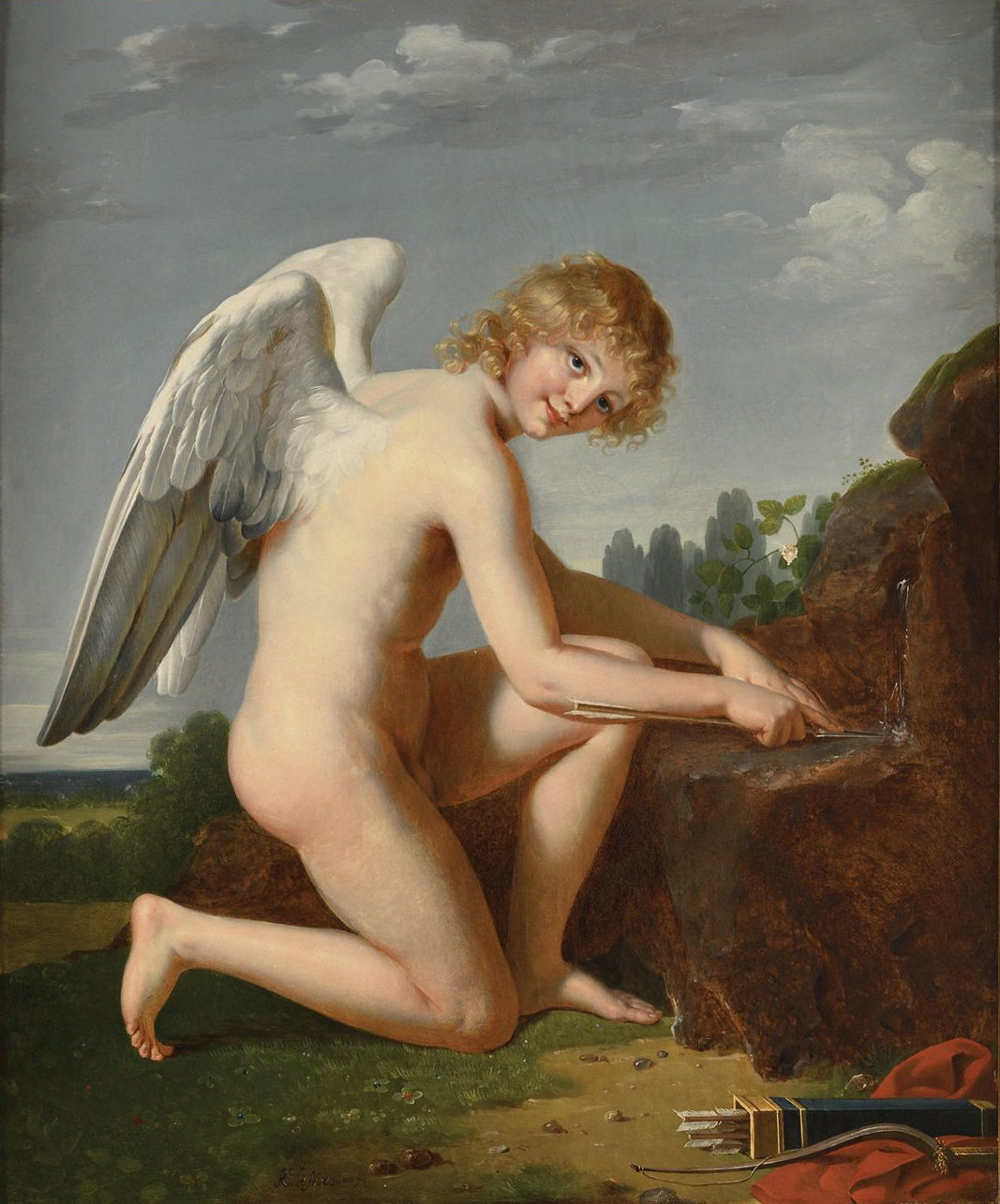
Cupid sharpening his arrows, painting by Robert Lefèvre exhibited at the Salon of 1798 (n°260)

This was one of Caravaggio's more challenging compositions and the artist placed the four figures closely together within the small space of the canvas—the placement of the figures in the composition displays a relaxed front and back formation of the male subjects. The painting was in poor condition, and the music in the manuscript has been badly damaged by past restorations, although a tenor and an alto part can be made out. Andrew Graham-Dixon notes that despite this damage, the work's originality remains undimmed.

=== Iconography and symbolism ===
Cupid is often referred to as an allegory for love, for this piece his presence conveys him as absent-minded while picking at his grapes. Perhaps this is an indication of Cupid's need for sustenance and a possible message about the center figure's need for love.

The figures are painted sitting closely together to create an intimate setting but this also provides a personal perspective for the viewer. The details of each figure can be seen more distinctly, dirt under their fingernails and their faces blushed and red.

The manuscripts show that the boys are practicing madrigals celebrating love, and the eyes of the lutenist, the principal figure, are moist with tears—the songs presumably describe the sorrow of love rather than its pleasures. The violin in the foreground suggests a fifth participant, implicitly including the viewer in the tableau.

=== Identity of the figures ===
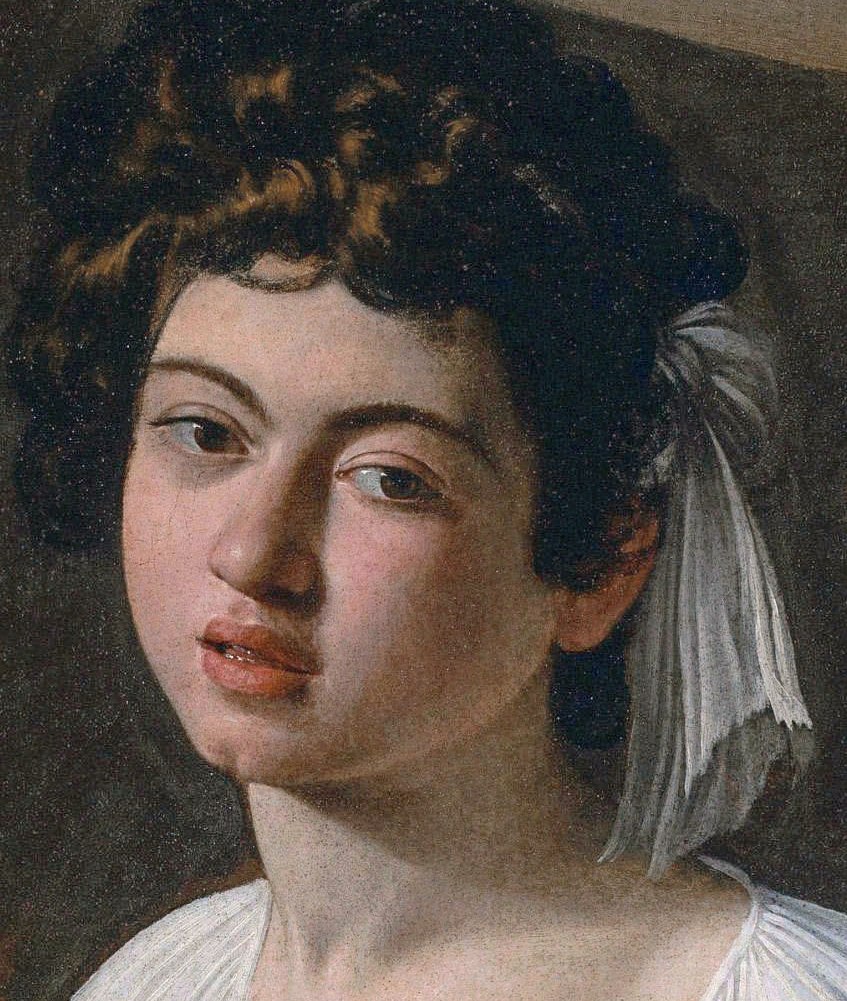
The Lute Player, 1596, oil on canvas, Caravaggio

Caravaggio seems to have composed the painting from studies of two figures. The central figure with the lute has been identified as Caravaggio's companion Mario Minniti, and the individual next to him and facing the viewer is possibly a self-portrait of the artist. The Cupid bears resemblance to the boy in Boy Peeling Fruit, done a few years before, and also to the angel in Saint Francis of Assisi in Ecstasy.

The individuals who modeled for Caravaggio were essential to his artwork. The depictions he created from live models maintained the unique features of each individual even when portraying characters from biblical or mythological stories. Caravaggio believed in the concept of "ritrarre dal naturale," or painting from life; rather than using the intellect or ideas as inspiration, Caravaggio often painted natural-looking figures from everyday life instead of idealized figures from the imagination. Caravaggio's style was not always accepted by the elites, buyers, and his fellow artists because of this.

He was known for painting his subjects and models right on to his canvases without sketching first. This was seen as unconventional for his time but he would break the boundaries of traditional Renaissance painting by creating works of art that depicted people in a way that was natural and reflected everyday people.

Caravaggio applied a precise approach when painting the models in his pieces, including non-human subjects such as still life. These models shared the same level of individuality as the human models but were subject to revision by the artist. The selection of human models appears to be based on their facial features and the characteristics associated with their appearance. Caravaggio used his models in repetitive roles, assigning them to roles that contradicted their physiognomy.

== Historical context ==
Scenes showing musicians were a popular theme at the time—the Church was supporting a revival of music and new styles and forms were being tried, especially by educated and progressive prelates such as del Monte. This scene, however, is clearly secular rather than religious, and harks back to the long-established tradition of "concert" pictures, a genre originating in Venice and exemplified in its earlier form by Titian's Le concert champêtre.

This painting falls into the period of Baroque art, which had a rich relationship with theater and music. Music and concerts became entertainment for people belonging to upper classes, like the aristocracy or people who held a high position or rank. Going to the opera or being able to view a live concert was very popular during the Baroque Period.

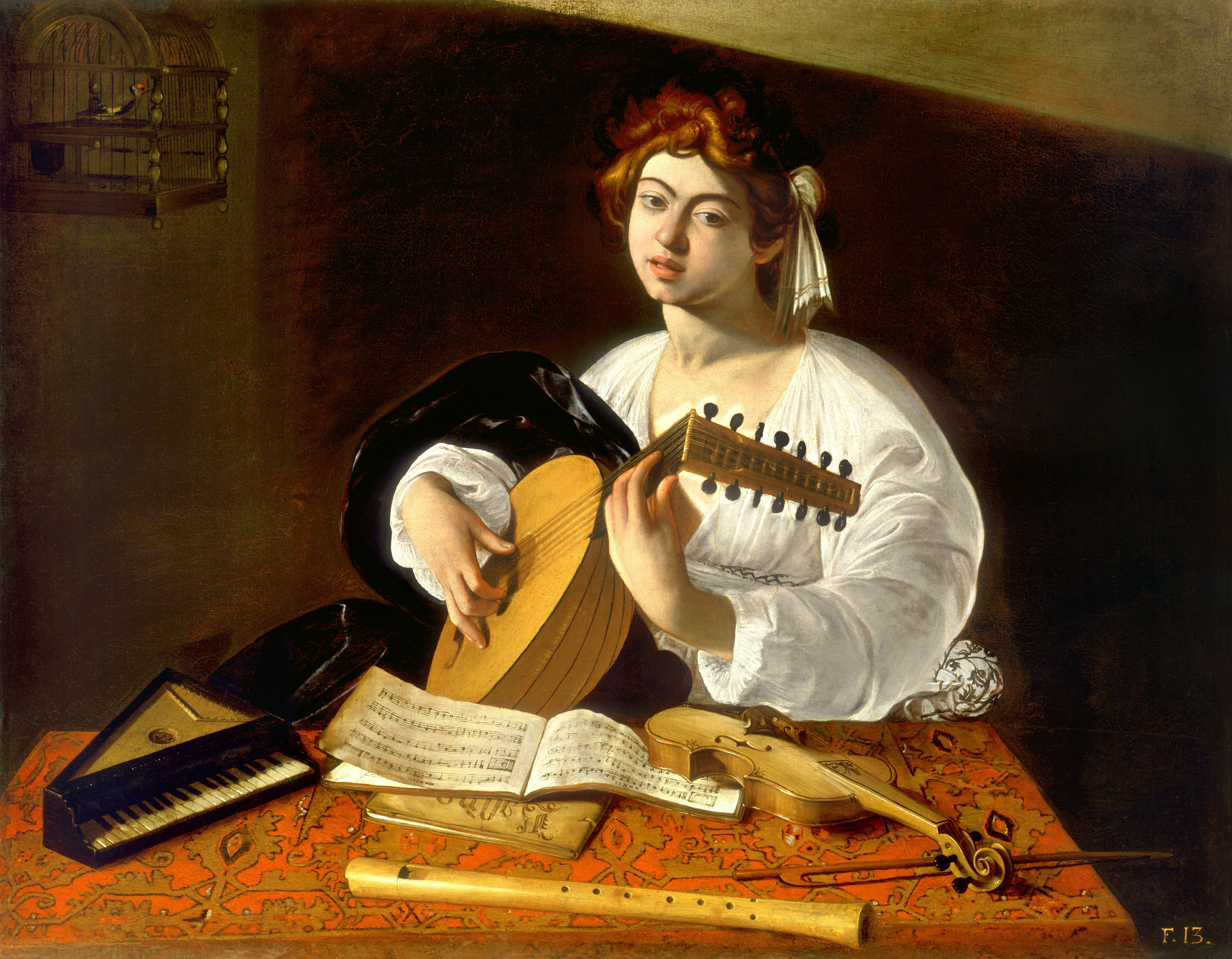
1596 Caravaggio, The Lute Player

The notion that experiencing various moods through music can promote emotional stability and overall well-being was widely held at this time. This is important in the painting; the mood and emotions conveyed on the face of the centered figure speaks largely to the importance of Baroque music. The rendering of instruments in the piece and the music sheets displayed are indicators of Caravaggio's ability to depict the important changes taking place within music and Cardinal del Monte's love for the emotion in Baroque music.

The importance of music was vital and created a pathway for Caravaggio to navigate Baroque music with the help of del Monte. Music proved to be important to both artist and patron when it came to artistic rendering due to the movement ability to showcase the patrons wealth and interests when he hosted visitors in his home. When visitors saw this painting or others including The Lute Player, it would speak largely to the Cardinal's taste, wealth and interests. This also bolstered Caravaggio in the genre of paintings of music and benefited his career.

== Recovering Lost Fictions ==
"Recovering Lost Fictions" is a project that took place in 1997, by contemporary artists Kathleen Gilje and Joseph Grigely. The project explored the history of Caravaggio's painting, and revealed information through X-rays and research of another history of the painting not previously known. Their work revealed that there was more than one copy of this painting. It also conveyed the relationship between the first and second painting. Their research also explored the x-rays taken of del Monte's version, which revealed Caravaggio had painted over an original scene that is described as an incident between the musicians. The project also included an installation created by the artists that displayed their research and resources such as x-rays, monographs and records related to the restoration of the painting. The installation was placed alongside the painting for its exhibition that ran from October 9 to December 28 of 1997. This project was also accompanied by a publication of the book Recovering lost fictions: Caravaggio's Musicians. The book was published by MIT List Visual Arts Center in 1997 and includes one essay by Joseph Grigely.

== Loan to Australia ==
During the COVID-19 pandemic, the museum began a skylight replacement project that resulted in gallery closures, in response the Met loaned major works from the European collection, including 'The Musicians', to Qagoma in an exhibition titled 'European Masterpieces'.

== See also ==
- List of paintings by Caravaggio
