= Venus, Adonis and Cupid =

Painting by Annibale Carracci

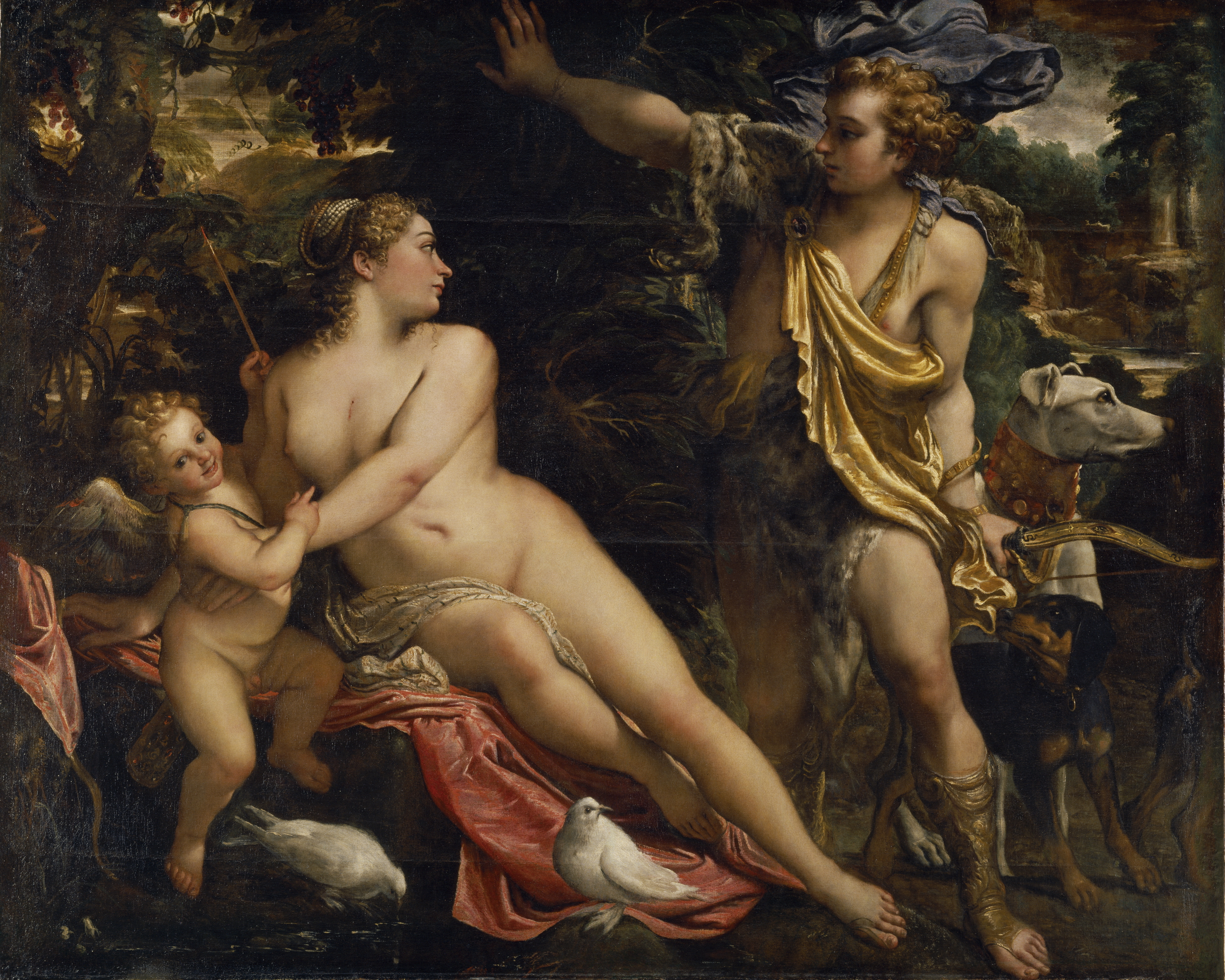
Venus, Adonis and Cupid by Annibale Carracci

Venus, Adonis and Cupid is a painting created c. 1595 by the Italian Baroque artist Annibale Carracci. The painting is in the Museo del Prado, Madrid. It entered the Spanish royal collection in 1664.

The painting has three main figures, arranged in a forest landscape: Venus holding Cupid who points at her and Venus looking at Adonis across from her as Adonis looks back. Adonis is accompanied by his hunting dogs as he moves the tree branches and reveals Venus. The painting is arranged diagonally, with loose and fine brushstrokes giving it a naturalistic look. The colors are muted throughout most of the piece but vivid in the figures, drawing the viewer's attention. The painting shows the influence of painters such as Titian and Correggio, as well as ancient Greek sculptures. The composition is influenced strongly by Veronese.

Annibale Carracci (1560–1609) and Caravaggio were among the most influential artists of their time, who through their artistic styles led to the transition from Mannerism to Baroque. Annibale Carracci and his brother Agostino established an academy of art called Accademia degli Incamminati, which pioneered the development of Bolognese Painting.

== Mythology ==
The myth of Venus and Adonis was first told in Ovid's Metamorphosis: Book X. This is the most widely accepted version of the myth. Adonis was a handsome young man, more beautiful than even the Gods, although his creation was from an incestuous union. Venus was playing with her son Cupid in the woods and was punctured in the chest by one of his arrows. The wound was deeper than she thought, and before it healed she witnessed Adonis. She immediately fell passionately in love with him and forgot about her other lovers and her life on Olympus. She followed him and helped him with his hunting, dressing like Diana. She warned him that "bravery is unsafe when faced with the brave. Do not be foolish, beware of endangering me, and do not provoke the creatures nature has armed, lest your glory is to my great cost." When Venus left by her swans to the skies, Adonis provoked a wild boar and was killed. She fled to his aid but was too late so she turned his blood into a flower, which would bloom each year to remind her of her grief and their love.

== The painting ==
Venus, Adonis and Cupid illustrates Ovid's myth. Annibale captures the scene when the lovers first meet. The blood from Cupid's arrow can still be seen on Venus's chest. The scene eliminates the dramatic and narrative elements and focuses on the emotional ones, portrayed through gestures and eye contact. The "sensuality of the encounter is conveyed through the three dimensionality of the volumes and the gentle chiaroscuro", particularly seen in Venus. Annibale was strongly influenced by Correggio in this element, as well as the use of gestures to engage the viewer. The scene is also directly correlated with Titian's poesia, a series of mythological paintings for Felipe II, among them Venus and Adonis. The use of the three figures as well as the poetic interpretation of the myth is reminiscent of Titian's painting. Annibale crosses the realm of artistic style between realism and ideal classicalism in this painting. His earlier works, such as The Bean Eater, reflect just one of Annibale's impressive range of artwork and his ability to produce realistic works. He paints genre scenes, landscapes, portraits, mythological/classical scenes, as well as caricatures and religious commissions.

== Figural composition ==
The figures of Venus, Adonis and Cupid are extremely detailed and have a classical element, as seen previously in works by Michelangelo and Raphael. The bodies of Cupid and Venus are twisted and the entire composition has a diagonal theme. Venus and Cupid are nude, while Adonis is draped in animal skins that reflect his nature as a hunter. He has a blue drape blowing in the wind and a yellow drapery across his body and he carries a bow and quiver in his left hand. Typically in Ancient Greece, Aphrodite, or Venus, was always portrayed nude, one of the key attributes that distinguish her as the goddess of love. Other female sculptures of the time were heavily clothed. Adonis and Venus are looking at each other, increasing the emotional tension of the scene and cupid is looking at us as if inviting the viewer into the scene. His hand appears to be pointing towards Venus, possibly at the wound in her chest. Cupid is holding the arrow that pierced Venus, the wound still evident in the middle of her chest. Cupid still has his baby fat and is chubby looking, whereas Adonis has a young muscular body which is characteristic of heroic male nudes of ancient Greek sculpture.

His later work on the Farnese Gallery ceiling incorporates these stylistic elements: the use of the diagonal, the full classical bodies with flowing locks of hair, and the partial nudity clad in drapery. Annibale spent many years in Rome studying Greek sculpture, and was particularly fascinated with Lacoon and his Sons and wrote to his brother about it. Venus's "voluptuous body" is drawn from Titian's ability to paint female nudes as seen in Venus and Adonis. Venus and Adonis (1553) by Titian shows a nude Venus clinging to Adonis, with them directly looking at each other. Cupid is in the background, with a simple landscape and Adonis holding the dogs. Annibale also draws the idea of a landscape behind the main composition from Titian as well. In Annibale's version, Adonis pushes aside the leafy foliage to reveal Venus.

== Composition ==
The figures are the primary focus and dominate the scene. The background is very detailed, depicting trees, leaves, a small creek, rocks and what appears to be ancient Roman ruins in the top right corner. The water along the bottom of the columns reflects the sky. The top left and right corners show openings from the forest giving more of a view as well as depth. There are two doves underneath Venus, a symbol for love. The left dove is drinking out of the creek that runs underneath them. Adonis has three hunting dogs, although the third dog is partly cut off, which illustrates that the scene is much bigger than portrayed.

== Artistic style ==
The background is done with loose brushstrokes whereas the main figures are very classical and ideal shown through intricate details and realism. Venus' hairpiece is made up of small beads and Adonis' quiver, sandals, and clothing have specific details that aid to his character. Even the dogs' collars are significant. Something peculiar is that Cupid's wings have a little red on them, possibly the blood from Venus' chest or just Annibale's way of showing reflection. The pink drapery underneath Venus, possibly representing love because it is a derivative of red, has loose areas of color throughout it. The three primary colors are displayed in the piece: yellow, blue, and pink and are the most vibrant of the piece, all in a pastel shade. All the draperies have lose white brushes on them in order to look like reflections of the light.

Annibale Carracci is probably most well known for his work on the Farnese Gallery Ceiling, which was commissioned a few years after this work. He incorporated elements from Venus, Adonis and Cupid into the ceiling including another image of Venus among other mythological tales. His use of dynamics, arrangement of the composition, the style of the bodies, eye contact and gestures are once again used to convey a deep emotional connection between the figures. Carracci also studied the works of Correggio in Parma, Veronese and Tintoretto in Venice and then Rome. Veronese's Venus and Adonis (1580) depicted the scene right before Adonis dies. Adonis is lying on Venus' lap after being wounded by the boar. Cupid Holds the dogs and Venus is glancing at him instead of looking at Adonis. Both Veronese's and Titian's Venus and Adonis paintings greatly influenced Annibale's Venus, Adonis and Cupid and aided the great artist in becoming one of the great masters of Baroque painting.
