= Villa Mazzarosa, Segromigno in Monte =

Villa near Lucca, Italy

Villa Mazzarosa is an early 17th-century country palace and gardens located in Segromigno in Monte, near Capannori, about 12 kilometers northeast of the city of Lucca in the region of Tuscany, Italy.

== History and description ==
The estate for this villa was owned by the Arnolfini, Orsucci and Lucchesini families, then became properties of the Mazzarosz family who completed most of the present building by 1634. Both the valley and the mountain facades have double flight of stairs. The present garden was designed in 1810 by Antonio Mazzarosa; in 1830 the Famedio, a neoclassic round tempietto used by the family as an exhibition site. The nymphaeum in the garden was designed originally in 1714 by Filippo Juvarra, but is now generally modified. The gardens include liriodendron, a camellia’s grove, and a citrus house. The gardens and villa were most recently refurbished by Antonio Mazzarosa.

The villa and gardens are open to tours. It lies close to Villa Mansi and Villa Torrigiani.
