= Ludwig Heinrich Buchholtz =

Prussian ambassador (1740–1811)

Ludwig Heinrich von Buchholtz (1740–1811) was a Prussian diplomat, who served as ambassador to the Polish-Lithuanian Commonwealth from 1780 to 1789, and again 1792 to 1794 (in the meantime, he was replaced by Girolamo Lucchesini). He was instrumental in the signing of the short-lived Polish-Prussian alliance.
