= Third Partition of Poland =

1795 division of Poland–Lithuania

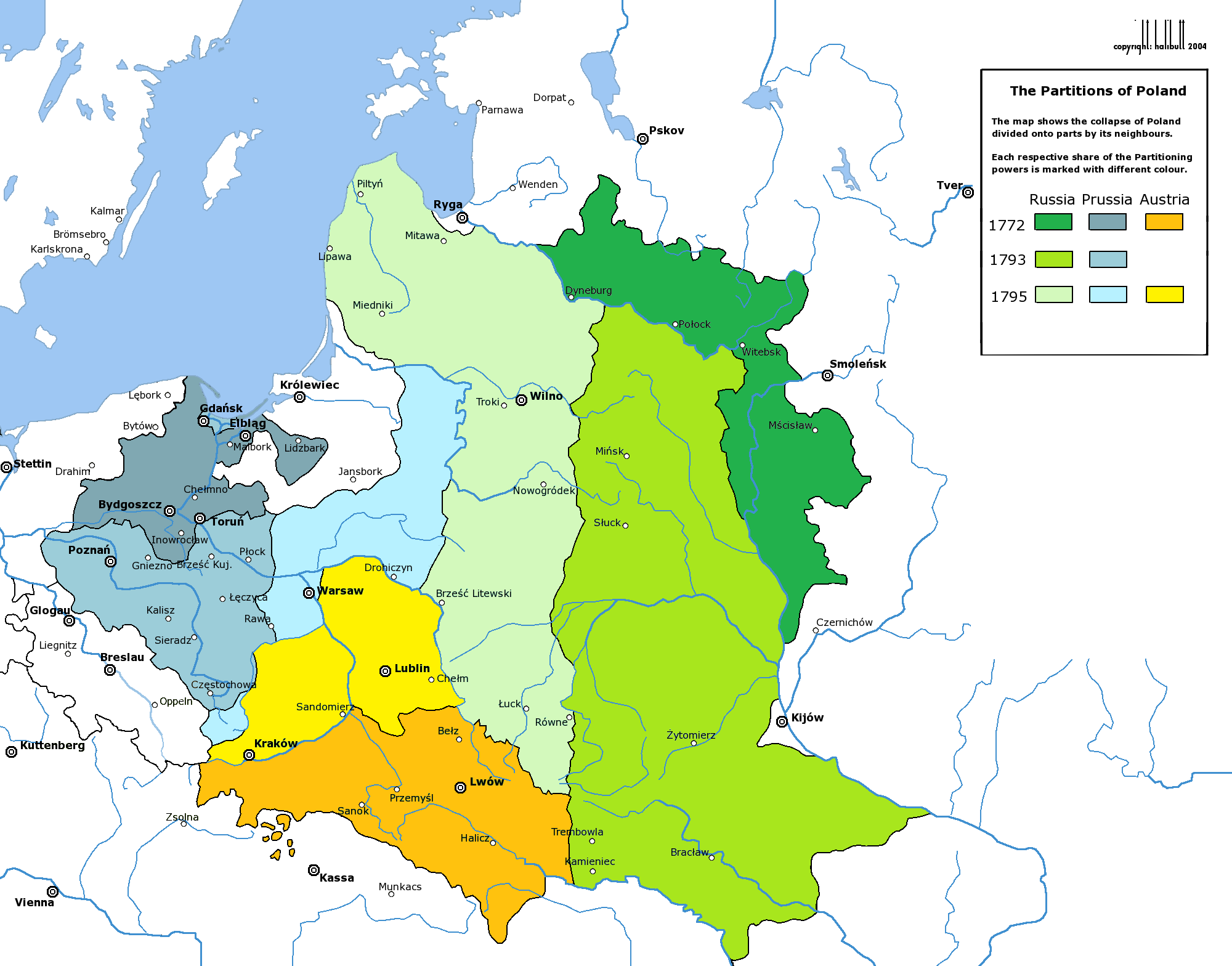
- Aftermath of the Third Partition of the Commonwealth, with the disappearance of sovereign Poland and Lithuania.

Population losses in the 3rd Partition
- To Austria: 1.2 million
- To Prussia: 1 million
- To Russia: 1.2 million

Final territorial losses
- To Prussia: Northern and Western Poland (Podlachia), Western Lithuania (Sudovia)
- To the Habsburg Monarchy: Southern Poland (Western Galicia and Southern Masovia)
- To Russia: Eastern Lithuania

The Third Partition of Poland (1795) was the last in a series of the Partitions of Poland–Lithuania and the land of the Polish–Lithuanian Commonwealth among Prussia, the Habsburg monarchy, and the Russian Empire which effectively ended Polish–Lithuanian national sovereignty until 1918. The partition was the result of the Kościuszko Uprising and was followed by a number of Polish–Lithuanian uprisings during the period.

== Background ==
Following the First Partition of Poland in 1772, in an attempt to strengthen the significantly weakened Commonwealth, King Stanisław August Poniatowski put into effect a series of reforms to enhance Poland's military, political system, economy, and society. These reforms reached their climax with the enactment of the May Constitution in 1791, which established a constitutional monarchy with separation into three branches of government, strengthened the bourgeoisie and abolished many of the nobility's privileges as well as many of the old laws of serfdom. In addition, to strengthen Poland's international standings, King Stanislaus signed the Polish-Prussian Pact of 1790. Angered by what was seen as dangerous, Jacobin-style reforms, Russia invaded Poland in 1792, beginning the War in Defense of the Constitution. Abandoned by her Prussian allies and betrayed by Polish nobles who desired to restore the privileges they had lost under the May Constitution, Poland was forced to sign the Second Partition in 1793, which ceded Dobrzyn, Kujavia, and a large portion of Greater Poland to Prussia and all of Poland's eastern provinces from Moldavia to Livonia to Russia, reducing Poland to one-third of her original size before the First Partition.

Outraged with the further humiliation of Poland by its neighbors and the betrayal by the Polish nobility, and emboldened by the French Revolution unfolding in France, the Polish masses quickly turned against the occupying forces of Prussia and Russia. Following a series of nationwide riots, on 24 March 1794, Polish patriot Tadeusz Kościuszko took command of the Polish armed forces and declared a nationwide uprising against Poland's foreign occupiers, marking the beginning of the Kościuszko Uprising. Catherine II and Frederick William II were quick to respond and, despite initial successes by Kosciuszko's forces, the uprising was crushed by November 1794. According to legend, when Kosciuszko fell off of his horse at the Battle of Maciejowice, shortly before he was captured, he said "Finis Poloniae", meaning in Latin "[This is] the end of Poland."

== Terms ==
Austrian, Prussian, and Russian representatives met on 24 October 1795 to dissolve the Polish–Lithuanian Commonwealth, with the three conquering powers signing a treaty to divide the region on 26 January 1797. This gave the Habsburg monarchy control of the Western Galicia and Southern Mazovia territories, with approximately 1.2 million people; Prussia received Podlachia, the remainder of Masovia, and Warsaw, with 1 million people; and Russia received the remaining land, including Vilnius and 1.2 million people. Unlike previous partitions, no Polish representative was party to the treaty. The Habsburgs, Russia, and Prussia forced King Stanislaus to abdicate and retire to St. Petersburg, where he died as a trophy prisoner in 1798. The victors also agreed to erase the country's name:

In view of the necessity to abolish everything which could revive the memory of the existence of the Kingdom of Poland, now that the annulment of this body politic has been effected ... the high contracting parties are agreed and undertake never to include in their titles ... the name or designation of the Kingdom of Poland, which shall remain suppressed as from the present and forever ...

== Aftermath ==
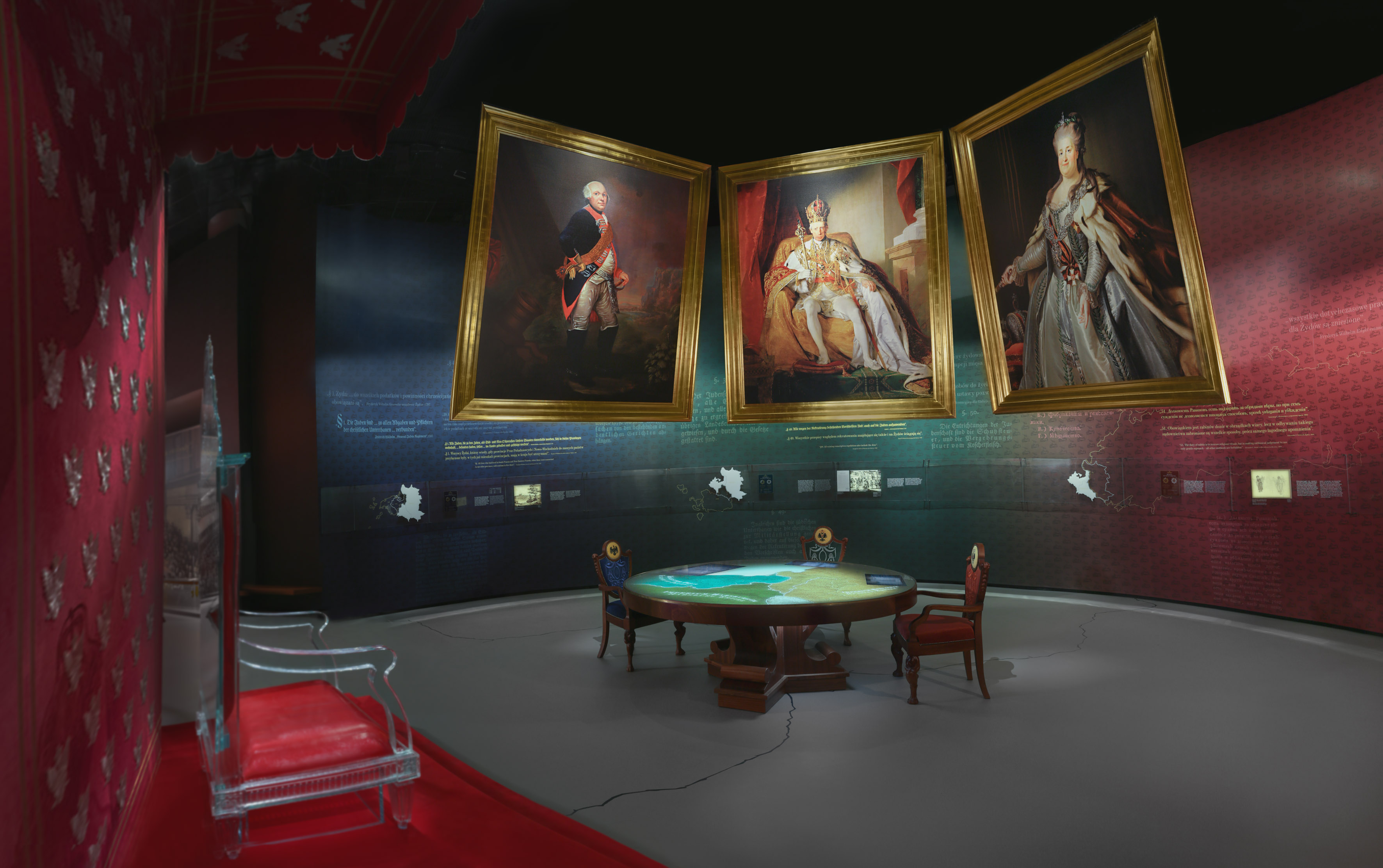
Part of the permanent exhibition dedicated to the partitions of Poland at the Museum of the History of Polish Jews in Warsaw

The Third Partition of the Polish–Lithuanian Commonwealth ended the existence of independent Polish or Lithuanian states for the next 123 years. Immediately following the Third Partition, the occupying powers forced many Polish politicians, intellectuals, and revolutionaries to migrate across Europe, in what was later known as the Great Emigration. These Polish nationalists participated in uprisings against Austria, Prussia, and Russia in former Polish lands, and many would serve France as part of the Polish Legions. In addition, Polish poets and artists would make the desire for national freedom a defining characteristic of the Polish Romanticist movement. Poland briefly regained semi-autonomy in 1807 when Napoleon created the Duchy of Warsaw, but this effectively ended with the Congress of Vienna in 1815. The Congress created the Kingdom of Poland, sometimes called Congress Poland, as a Russian puppet state. Even this, however, came to an end after a Polish insurrection in 1831, at which point Russia ended most of the kingdom's autonomy and exacted multiple punitive measures on the Polish populace. In 1867, Russia made Poland an official part of the Russian Empire, as opposed to a puppet state. Poland would not regain full independence until the end of World War I when the signing of the Treaty of Versailles and the collapse of the Austro-Hungarian Empire allowed for the resurrection of Polish national sovereignty.

On 29 August 1918, the Council of People's Commissars of the Russian Soviet Federative Socialist Republic denounced the partitions of Poland.

== See also ==
- Administrative division of Polish territories after partitions
- Administrative division of the Polish–Lithuanian Commonwealth in the course of partitions
- Fourth Partition of Poland
