= Bartolomeo Beverini =

Italian scholar and historian

- Born: May 3, 1629; Lucca, Republic of Lucca
- Died: 24 October 1686 (aged 57); Lucca, Republic of Lucca
- Occupations: Catholic priest; Historian; Poet; Classical Scholar; Translator
- Known for: Italian translation of the Aeneid; Annales lucienses
- Parent(s): Bernardo Beverini and Chiara Beverini (née Pierotti)

Academic work
- Discipline: Classics
- Sub-discipline: History of Rome, Latin language
- Institutions: University of Lucca
- Influenced: Sebastiano Paoli; Lazzaro Papi; Pietro Giordani; Cesare Lucchesini

Bartolomeo Beverini (3 May 1629 – 24 October 1686) was an Italian classical scholar, historian and poet.

== Biography ==
Beverini was born at Lucca on 3 May 1629. He is said to have been a finished scholar at fifteen; and at Rome, in his sixteenth year, he joined the Order of the Mother of God, taking vows in 1647. He taught theology in Rome, and later, rhetoric at the Collegio di S. Maria Corteorladini of Lucca. His numerous works are listed by Mazzuchelli. Among them is a vernacular translation of the Æneid, originally the fruit of only thirteen months' application, but subsequently corrected with care. It first appeared at Lucca in 1680, and has been reprinted several times; the last edition is that of Rome, 1700. The Latin poems of Beverini were published at Lucca in 1674: Carminum libri septem. Beverini's chief claim, however, upon the notice of general scholars, is founded upon a learned posthumous work, first published at Lucca in 1711, and often reprinted in collections, entitled, Syntagma de Ponderibus et Mensuris, in quo veterum Nummorum Pretium, ac Mensurarum Quantitas demonstratur. This is followed by a treatise on the Comitia of the Romans. Beverini was one of the chief correspondents of Francesco Redi.

== Works ==
- Beverini, Bartolomeo. Vita di S. Cecilia vergine e martire descritta dal padre Bartolomeo Beverini della Congreg. della Madre di Dio, con alcune annotationi historiche, e morali. Lucca: Iacinto Paci, 1663.
- Beverini, Bartolomeo (1666). Selectiores dicendi formulae ex triumviris latinitatis Plauto, Terentio, Arbitro collectae. Lucae: Paci. The work was first published anonymously in Lucca in 1666, then in Naples in 1689 by the printer Giacomo Raillard (again anonymously) and finally in Palermo in 1755.
- Beverini, Bartolomeo (1674). Carminum libri septem (in Latin). Lucae: Apud H. Pacium.
- Beverini, Bartolomeo (1674). Eneide di Virgilio. Lucca: appresso Iacinto Paci.
- Beverini, Bartolomeo (1674). Syntagma de ponderibus et mensuris, in quo veterum nummorum pretium, ac mensurarum quantitas demonstratur (in Latin). Lucae: Typis P. Frediani. This work contains two essays, one on the weights, measures and coinage of ancient Rome, and the other on the different types of Roman Comitia.
- Beverini, Bartolomeo (1714). Johann Georg Walch (ed.). Syntagma de ponderibus, et mensuris, quo veterum nummorum pretium, ac mensurarum quantitas demonstratur (in Latin) (2 ed.). Leipzig: Sumpt. Io. Ludovici Gleditschii & Maur. Georg. Weidmanni.
- Beverini, Bartolomeo (1829). Annalium ab origine Luciensis urbis libri XV (in Latin). Vol. 1. Lucca: typis Francisci Bertinii.
- Beverini, Bartolomeo (1829). Annalium ab origine Luciensis urbis libri XV (in Latin). Vol. 2. Lucca: typis Francisci Bertinii.
- Beverini, Bartolomeo (1830). Annalium ab origine Luciensis urbis libri XV (in Latin). Vol. 3. Lucca: typis Francisci Bertinii.
- Beverini, Bartolomeo (1832). Annalium ab origine Luciensis urbis libri XV (in Latin). Vol. 4. Lucca: typis Francisci Bertinii.

== Sources ==
- Lombardi Lotti, Mansueto (1935). Un dotto lucchese del Seicento: Bartolomeo Beverini. Lucca: Amedei.
- Hutton, James (1935). The Greek Anthology in Italy to the Year 1800. Ithaca: Cornell University Press. p. 372.
- De Blasi, Nicola (1967). "BEVERINI, Bartolomeo". Dizionario Biografico degli Italiani (in Italian). Vol. 9: Berengario–Biagini. Rome: Istituto dell'Enciclopedia Italiana. ISBN 978-88-12-00032-6.
- Onelli, Corinna (2011). "An innovative schoolbook: the Selectiores dicendi formulae (1666) of Father Bartolomeo Beverini". History of Education & Children's Literature. VI (1): 39–57. doi:10.1400/171290. ISSN 1971-1093.
- Rose, Hugh James (1848). New General Biographical Dictionary. Vol. IV. Fellowes.
