= Villa Mansi =

Villa in Tuscany, Italy

Coordinates: 43.8931°N 10.5908°E

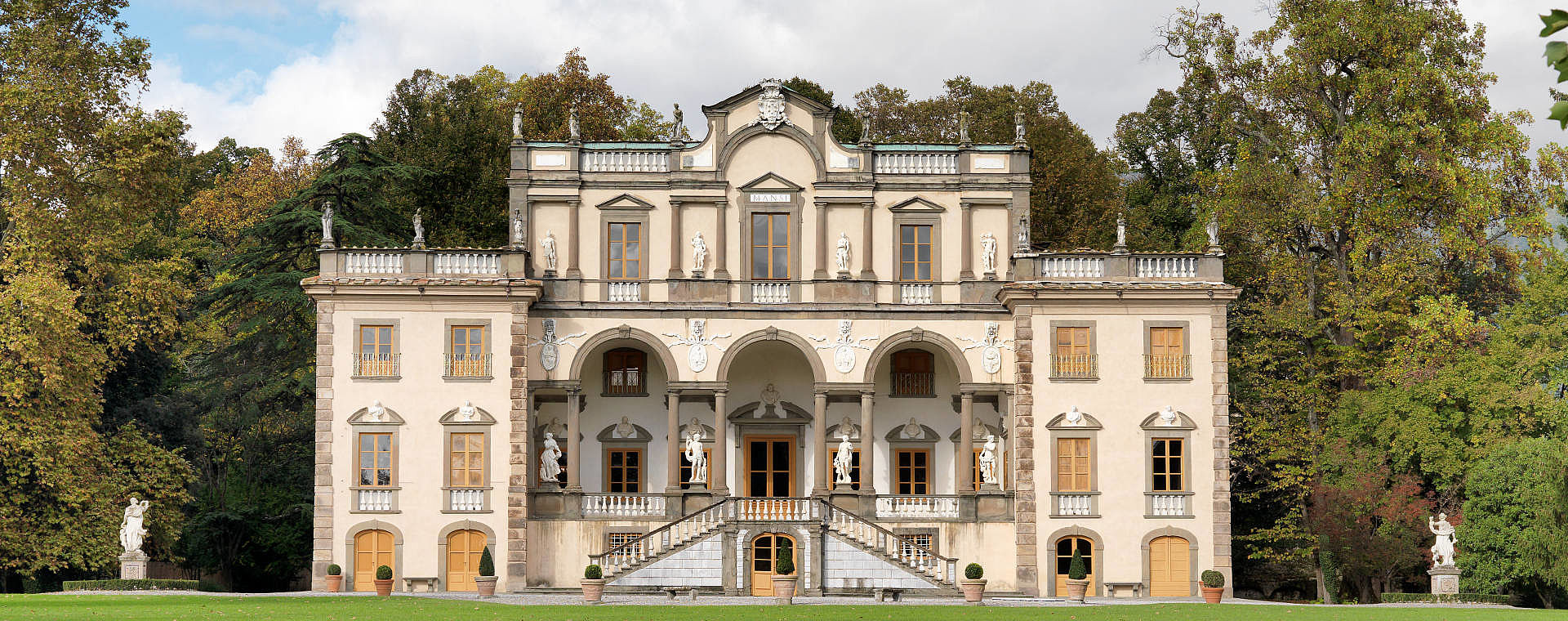

Villa Mansi is a country palace and gardens located in Segromigno in Monte, near Capannori, about 12 kilometers northeast of the city of Lucca in the region of Tuscany, Italy.

== Biography ==
The villa was initially constructed in the 16th century by the Benedetti family, who sold the villa to the Cenami family, who included the Abbot Paolo Cenami, in 1599. The architect Muzio Oddi rebuilt the villa and gardens starting in 1634. The unusual facade has two wings flanking a central portico with thin double columns, accessed by a double ramped stairwell. In 1675 the property was acquired by Ottavio Mansi, from a wealthy silk merchant family, and during the 18th century, still owned by this family, the villa underwent major refurbishment under the guidance of the architect Giusti, provided with Rococo touches such as statuary and a roofline balustrade. However, the gardens and fountains/water works were theatrical masterworks designed by Filippo Juvarra. The interiors were painted by Stefano Tofanelli, including mythologic themes such as the Trial of Midas, the Death of Marysias, and a large ceiling fresco depicting the Triumph of Apollo.

The villa and the gardens have been modified in the following centuries. The gardens acquired a more natural and less formal layout. The gardens still retain scenic setpieces with grottoes.

The villa and gardens are open to tours. It lies close to Villa Mazzarosa and Villa Torrigiani.
