= Camigliano, Capannori =

Camigliano
- Frazione
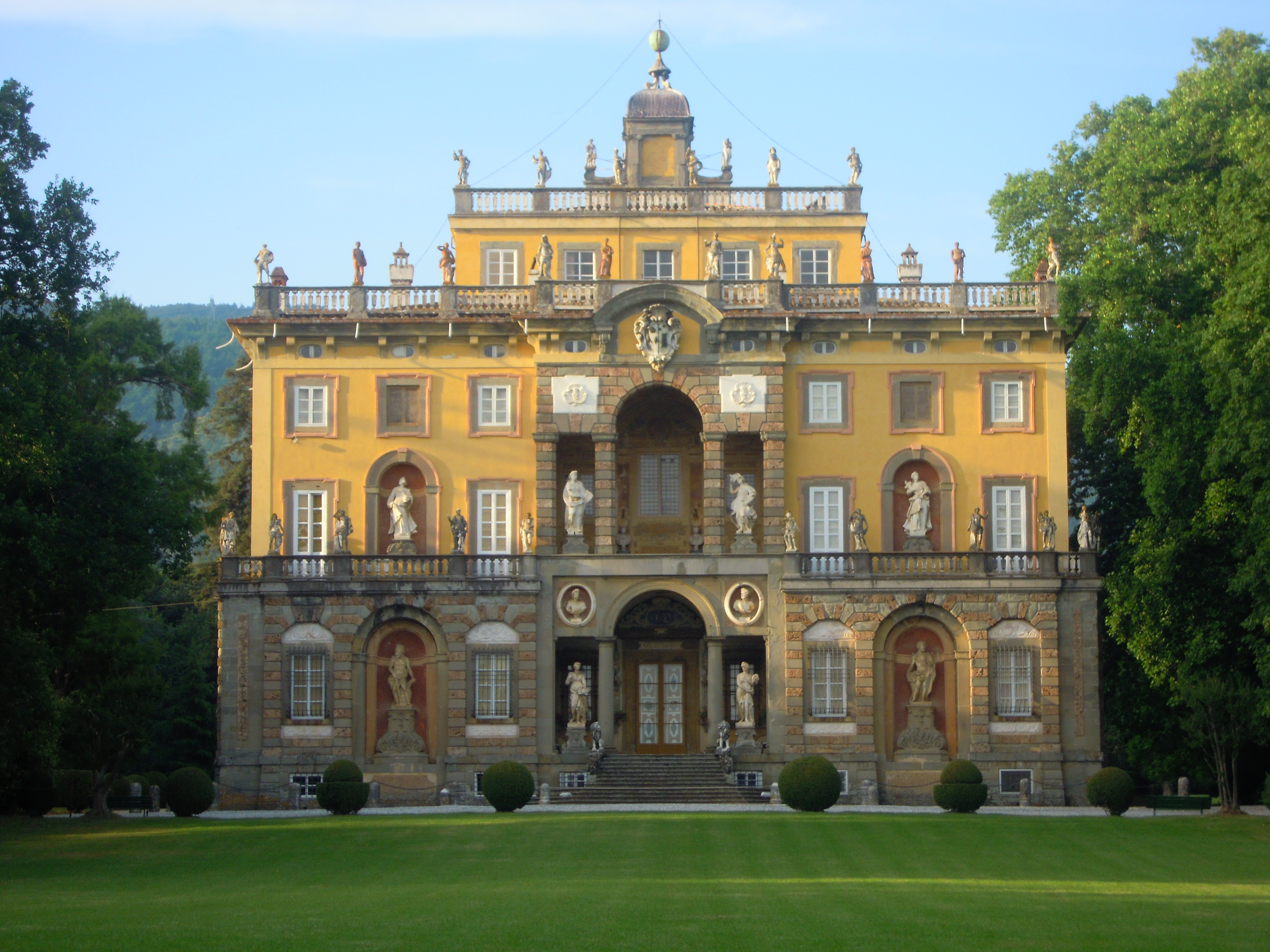
- Villa Torrigiani

- Location of Camigliano in Italy
- Coordinates: 43°53′01″N 10°36′07″E
- Country: Italy
- Region: Tuscany
- Province: Lucca (LU)
- Comune: Capannori
- Elevation: 121 m (397 ft)

Population (2018)
  - Total: 1,965
- Demonym: Camiglianesi
- Time zone: UTC+1 (CET)
  - Summer (DST): UTC+2 (CEST)

Camigliano is a village in Tuscany, central Italy, administratively a frazione of the comune of Capannori, province of Lucca. At the time of the 2018 parish census its population was 1,965.

== Main sights ==
- Church of San Michele (12th century)
- Villa Torrigiani (16th century)

== Bibliography ==
- Emanuele Repetti (1833). "Camigliano". Dizionario geografico fisico storico della Toscana. Vol. 1. Firenze. pp. 405, 439–440.
