= Polish–Prussian alliance =

1790 alliance between Poland–Lithuania and Prussia

The Polish-Lithuanian and Prussian Alliance was a mutual defense alliance signed on 29 March 1790 in Warsaw between representatives of the Polish–Lithuanian Commonwealth and the Kingdom of Prussia. It was signed in the brief period when Prussia was seeking an ally against either Austria or Russia, and the Commonwealth was seeking guarantees that it would be able to carry out significant governmental reforms without foreign intervention.

From the beginning, the alliance was much more valuable to the Commonwealth than to Prussia. Soon after the treaty was signed, the international situation, and changes within the Commonwealth, made the treaty much less valuable to the Prussian side. Meanwhile, the Commonwealth embarked on a series of major internal reforms, seeing the alliance as a guarantee that it had the backing of a powerful neighbour in the process, but in fact, Prussia felt that those reforms were not in its best interest and felt threatened by them. When Russia invaded the Commonwealth in May 1792, Prussia refused a request to honour the alliance and intervene, arguing that it was not consulted with regard to the 3 May Constitution, which invalidated the alliance. A few months later, in 1793, Prussia aided Russia in the suppression of the Kościuszko Uprising.

== Background ==
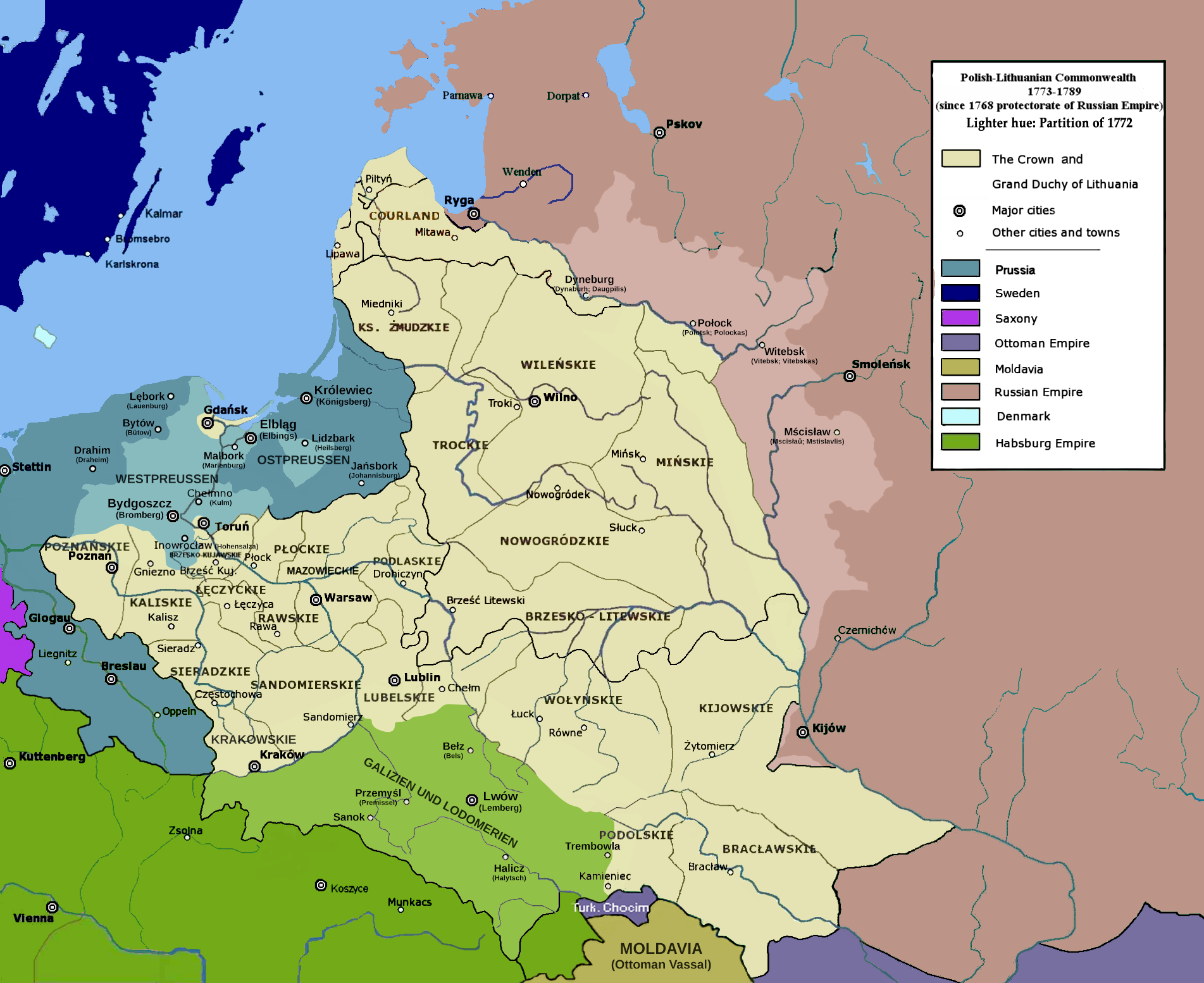
Polish–Lithuanian Commonwealth after the First Partition (1773–89) and surrounding countries (Prussia in gray blue)

The Polish–Lithuanian Commonwealth (also known as the Poland) had been a major European power since its formation in the late 16th century and was still one of the largest states in Europe in the latter part of the 18th century. Over time, its state machinery had become increasingly dysfunctional. By the early 17th century, the magnates of Poland and Lithuania controlled the state or rather managed to ensure that no reforms would be carried out that might weaken their privileged status (the so-called "Golden Freedoms").

Tentative reforms began in the late 18th century; however, any idea of reforming the Commonwealth was viewed with suspicion not only by its magnates but also by neighbouring countries, which were content with the state of the Commonwealth's affairs and abhorred the thought of a resurgent and democratic power on their borders. With an army numbering around only 16,000, Poland found that its neighbours could easily intervene directly: the Imperial Russian Army numbered 300,000, the Prussian Army and the Imperial Austrian Army 200,000. All of those powers had already annexed about a third of the Commonwealth territory and population (211,000 square kilometers (81,000 sq mi) and four to five million people) in the First Partition of Poland in 1772–1773.

However, events in the world appeared to play into the reformers' hands. Poland's neighbours were too occupied with wars to intervene forcibly in Poland, with Russia and Austria engaged in hostilities with the Ottoman Empire (the Russo-Turkish War (1787–92) and the Austro-Turkish War (1787–91)). The Russians also found themselves fighting Sweden (the Russo-Swedish War (1788–90)).

In the context of the Austrian Empire and the Russian Empire's war with the Ottoman Empire, Polish King Stanisław August Poniatowski, attempted to draw Poland into the Austro-Russian alliance since he saw a war with the Ottomans as an opportunity to strengthen the Commonwealth. Internal Russian politics prevented that plan from being implemented. Spurned by Russia, Poland turned to another potential ally, the Triple Alliance, represented on the Polish diplomatic scene primarily by the Kingdom of Prussia. That line of reasoning gained support from Polish politicians such as Ignacy Potocki and Adam Kazimierz Czartoryski.

Within the Triple Alliance, Prussia was hoping for some territorial gains in the Baltic region through war (with Russia), diplomacy (from the Commonwealth) or a combination. With regard to the Balkans, the Triple Alliance aimed at restraining Russia, as well as its ally, Austria, and there were expectations of a war between the Alliance and Russia (and possibly Austria) around 1791.

== Negotiations ==
Prussia tried to take the opportunity of the Russia's wars with the Ottoman Empire and Sweden to move the weak Commonwealth into its sphere of influence. Some factions in the Commonwealth deemed that as an opportunity to shake free from decades of Russian control. However, Prussia did not expect much from the alliance or even that it would pass. When the treaty was first proposed to the Great Sejm by Prussian Ambassador Ludwig Heinrich Buchholtz on 13 October 1788, Prussians expected that it would cause long and fruitless debate which the only outcome would be to ensure the weakening of the position of Russia and, to a lesser degree, Austria in Poland. Overall, for Prussia, the alliance with Poland was only one of several potential options, but for some Polish politicians it became a new and increasingly the only available strategy. The reception of Prussian proposal by the Sejm exceeded expectations, which has significantly strengthened the Patriotic Party. For the next year or so, the Prussians decided to delay taking any clear action, keeping their options open. Buchholtz was also reprimanded for allowing things to go too far, and another Prussian diplomat, Girolamo Lucchesini, was sent to Warsaw to aid him.

One of the Prussian requests to play for time to the Patriotic Party was that before the treaty was signed, more reforms within the Commonwealth government had to be seen. In October 1789, the changing international situation, primarily the military defeats of the Ottoman Empire, suddenly and temporarily increased the value of an alliance with Poland for Prussia. In the meantime, the previously antiroyalist Patriotic Party has begun drifting closer to the king. In February and March 1790, concrete proposals were exchanged between Warsaw and Berlin. Some difficulties were centred on Prussian demands for the cession of Gdańsk and Toruń and on tariffs, but the threat of a Polish-Austrian alliance, recently brought forward by Austria, caused Prussia to withdraw most of the demands that the Polish side found difficult to accept.

== Signing ==
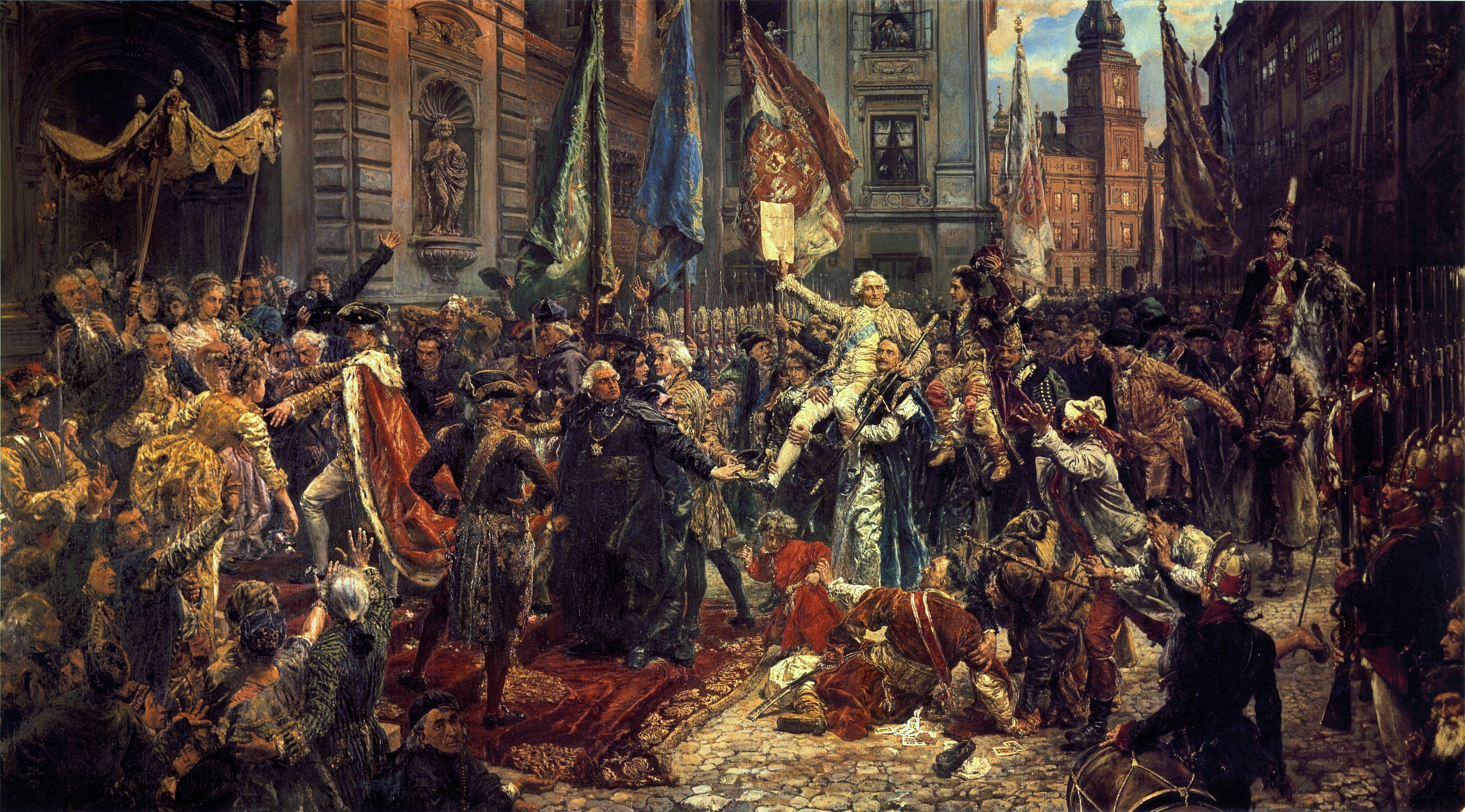
3 May Constitution, by Matejko, 1891. King Stanisław August (left, in regal ermine-trimmed cloak), enters St. John's Cathedral, where Sejm deputies will swear to uphold the new Constitution. In background, Warsaw's Royal Castle, where the Constitution has just been adopted.

The treaty was finally signed on 29 March 1790, and ratified on 23 April. It was a defensive treaty, as each country promised to aid the other in case of an invasion.

== Unravelling ==
Several factors, however, soon reduced the value of the treaty for Prussia. The Treaty of Reichenbach on July 27, 1790, meant that Prussia was no longer considering a war with Austria; the Polish–Prussian alliance was now only anti-Russian. Then, on September 9, the Great Sejm, despite some opposition, declared that Commonwealth territories could not be divided. As Prussia was expecting to receive Gdańsk and Toruń from the Commonwealth as compensation in a subsequent treaty, with the Commonwealth being compensated through territorial gains from another neighbour, the Sejm declaration, which meant that no territory could be traded to another state, made the Commonwealth a much less valuable party for Prussian long-term goals. Already, in the fall and the winter of 1790, Prussian diplomacy had begun negotiations with Russians and hinted at abandoning Poland.

Potocki attempted to offer another deal to Prussia, namely, to support Prince Louis Charles of Prussia for the Polish throne, but Frederick William II of Prussia, advised by Ewald Friedrich von Hertzberg, refused that offer, as it did not seem profitable enough to Prussia, which was interested more in territorial gains than in a potentially-strengthened Commonwealth, which could ask for the return of the territories lost in the First Partition. The passing of the Constitution of 3 May 1791, although officially applauded by Frederick Wilhelm II, who sent a congratulatory note to Warsaw, caused further worry in Prussia. The Prussian statesman Ewald von Hertzberg expressed the fears of European conservatives: "The Poles have given the coup de grâce to the Prussian monarchy by voting a constitution", elaborating that a strong Commonwealth would likely demand the return of the lands that Prussia acquired in the First Partition. Finally, Prussian-Russian relations stabilised with the end of the Triple Alliance, which was cemented by the British-Netherlands-Prussian-Russian treaty of 26 July 1791 in which the Triple Alliance de facto capitulated to all Russian demands. In the meantime, similar negotiations of a never-realised Polish–Swedish alliance fell through as well.

== Aftermath ==
The Treaty of Jassy in January 1792 ended the Russian war with the Ottomans, and in April, the First Coalition wars began, forcing Prussia to move the bulk of its forces west to deal with Revolutionary France. Russia, angered by Poland's attempt to move out of its influence, invaded Poland in May. Around then, Prussian policy was already set against Poland. Rather than discussing how to aid it, Frederic Wilhelm and his ministers were discussing how to convince Austria and Prussia to a new partition. Lucchesini has already made several declarations that Prussia could not aid the Commonwealth, and in June that year, Potocki's mission to Berlin received a confirmation, motivated on the grounds that the 3 May Constitution changed Poland so much that Prussia did not consider its obligations binding. Prussian Foreign Minister Friedrich Wilhelm von Schulenburg-Kehnert clearly and with rare candor told Potocki that Prussia did not support the constitution but could not say so initially to avoid any Polish-Russian reconciliation and would not help even as a mediator, as it is not in Prussian's interest of the state to see Poland so strengthened that it could later threaten Prussia.

In January 1793 a Prussian corps entered Greater Poland, it was not as a Commonwealth ally but instead to guarantee Prussia's share of spoils in the Second Partition of Poland. Prussian forces were acting in support of the Prussian-Russian Treaty on the partition that month. Prussian forces later assisted Russians in several key battles of the Kościuszko Uprising, such as in the defeat of Tadeusz Kościuszko's forces at the Battle of Szczekociny. By 1795, the Commonwealth would cease to exist, with Prussia acquiring Gdańsk, Toruń and other territories that it had desired (see Prussian partition).

== Historiography ==
The issue of the Polish–Prussian alliance was subject to a comprehensive study as early as the 1890s, when Polish historian Szymon Askenazy published his work on the subject (Przymierze polsko-pruskie, 1900) focusing on the diplomatic and international aspects. Askenazy argued that the alliance fell more by inept Polish diplomacy than the Prussian agenda of realpolitik, but that view is not supported by majority of historians, and noted by Jerzy Łojek, who admitted, in his Geneza i obalenie Konstytucji 3 maja (1986), that he shared Askenazy's minority viewpoint. The question of to what degree the alliance was realistic and to what degree it represented a Prussian diplomatic feint to mislead Commonwealth politicians is still debated by modern historians. Similarly, as Piotr Wandycz has noted, the advantages and disadvantages of the alliance have been debated by the historians for over a century.
