= Cesare Lucchesini =

Italian statesman and philologist (1756–1832)

- Born: June 2, 1756; Lucca, Republic of Lucca
- Died: 16 May 1832 (aged 75); Lucca, Duchy of Lucca
- Occupations: Statesman; Philologist
- Parent(s): Francesco Lucchesini and Maria Caterina Lucchesini (née Montecatini)
- Relatives: Girolamo Lucchesini (brother)

The Marchese Cesare Lucchesini (2 July 1756 – 16 May 1832) was an Italian statesman and philologist.

== Biography ==
Cesare Lucchesini was born in Lucca, the youngest of three brothers. His older brother Girolamo served as a diplomat for the Kingdom of Prussia.

In 1764 he enrolled in the Collegio of San Carlo, also called the Collegio dei Nobili of Modena, where he family had moved to work for the ducal court. In Modena, one of his teachers was Lazzaro Spallanzani. He completed his education at the Collegio Nazareno of Rome. Returning to Lucca in 1776, he fostered an interest in Greek literature. He also learned various eastern languages including Coptic, Syriac, Hebrew, and Arabic.

In 1792–1794, in service of the Republic of Lucca, he was appointed to a diplomatic post in Vienna. In 1798, he was sent to Paris to lobby for the Republic, threatened by the French Revolutionary armies. He was able to return to Lucca in 1800, and served in various ministerial positions in Lucca. In 1805, he served in a delegation sent by Lucca to the coronation of Napoleon as King of Italy. He served in various posts in the principality of Lucca under the rule of Elisa Bonaparte. During this period the former Accademia degli Oscuri was converted into the Istituto Napoleone. He easily transitioned to working in the subsequent Duchy of Lucca under the rule of Maria Luisa of Spain. However, as he became elder, he dedicated himself mainly to translations and writings about languages, arts, and chronicles of Lucca.

== Selected works ==
- Dell'origine del politeismo in Grecia; Congettura intorno all'alfabeto greco;
- Dell'istituzione della vera tragedia greca per opera di Eschilo (Aeschylus), reprinted in the third volume of Lucchesini's Opere.
- Saggio d'osservazioni sopra un'opera recentemente pubblicata col titolo: Feste e cortigiane della Grecia, Lucca, 1806.
- Della lingua italiana e delle altre lingue moderne d'Europa; Delle lingue antiche e delle altre moderne, che si chiamano orientali, Lucca, 1819; Lucca, 1826.
