= Girolamo Lucchesini =

Kingdom of Prussia diplomat (1751–1825)

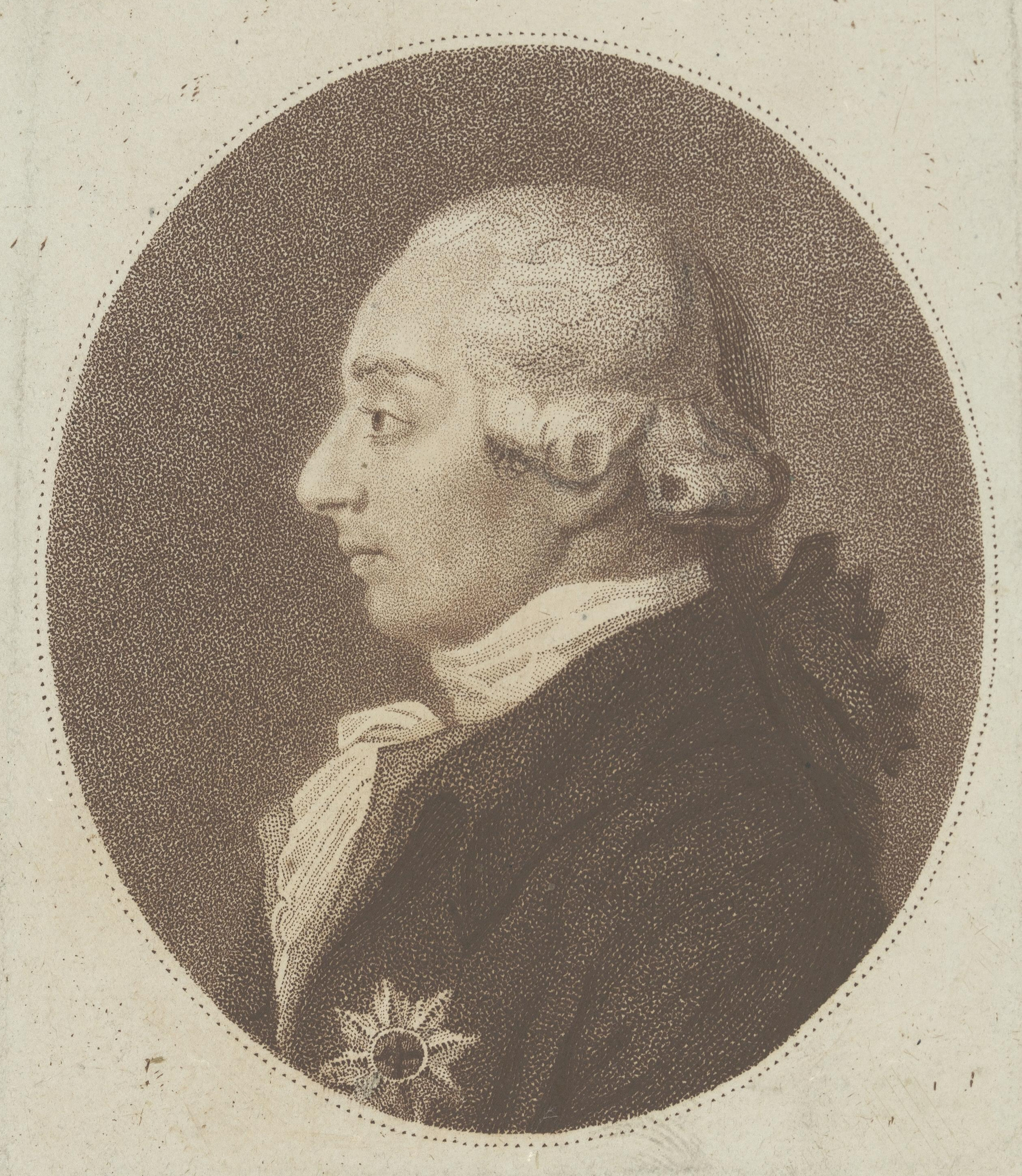
- Born: 7 May 1751; Lucca
- Died: 20 October 1825 (aged 74)
- Occupation: diplomat of the Kingdom of Prussia
- Notable work: published Salle cause et gli effetti della confederazione rizenana
- Father: Marquis Lucchesini

Girolamo Lucchesini (7 May 1751 – 20 October 1825) was a diplomat of the Kingdom of Prussia.

== Biography ==
Lucchesini was born at Lucca, the eldest son of Marquis Lucchesini. One of his younger brothers was the philologist Cesare Lucchesini.

In 1779 he went to Berlin where King Frederick the Great gave him a court appointment, making use of him in his literary relations with Italy. King Frederick William II, who recognized his gifts for diplomacy, sent him in 1787 to Rome to obtain the papal sanction for the appointment of a coadjutor to the bishop of Mainz, with a view to strengthening the German Fürstenbund. In 1788 he was sent to Warsaw, and brought about a rapprochement with Prussia and a diminution of Russian influence at Warsaw. He was accredited ambassador to the king and Poland on 12 April 1789.

Frederick William was at that time intriguing with the Ottoman Empire, then at war with Austria and Russia. Lucchesini was to rouse Polish feeling against Russia, and to secure for Prussia the concourse of Poland in the event of war with Austria and Russia. All his power of intrigue was needed in the conduct of these hazardous negotiations, rendered more difficult by the fact that Prussian policy excluded the existence of a strong Polish government.

A Polish-Prussian alliance was concluded in March 1790. Lucchesini had been sent in January of that year to secure the alliance of Saxony against Austria, and in September he was sent to Sistova, where representatives of the chief European powers were engaged in settling the terms of peace between Austria and Turkey, which were finally agreed upon on 4 August 1791. Before he returned to Warsaw the Polish treaty of which he had been the chief author had become a dead letter owing to the engagements made between Prussia and Austria at Reichenbach in July 1790, and Prussia was already contemplating the second partition of Poland. He was recalled at the end of 1791.

In July 1792 he joined Frederick William in the invasion of France. He was to be Prussian ambassador in Paris when the allied forces should have reinstated the authority of King Louis XVI. He was opposed alike to the invasion of France and the Austrian alliance, but his prepossessions did not interfere with his skilful conduct of the negotiations with Kellermann after the allies had been forced to retire by Dumouriez's guns at Valmy, nor with his success in securing the landgrave of Hesse-Darmstadts assistance against France.

In 1793 he was appointed ambassador to Vienna, with the ostensible object of securing financial assistance for the Rhenish campaign. He accompanied Frederick William through the Polish campaign of 1793 to 1794, and in the autumn returned to Vienna. His anti-Austrian bias made him extremely unpopular with the Austrian court, which asked in vain for his recall in 1795.

In 1797, after a visit to Italy in which he had an interview with Napoleon at Bologna, these demands were renewed and acceded to. In 1800 he was sent by Frederick William III. on a special mission to Paris. Despatches in which he expressed his distrust of Bonapartes peaceful professions and his conviction of the danger of the continuance of a neutral policy were intercepted by the first consul, who sought his recall, but eventually accepted him as regular ambassador (1802). He consistently sought friendly relations between France and Prussia, but he warned his government in 1806 of Napoleon's intention of restoring Hanover to George III and of Joachim Murat's aggressions in Westphalia. He was superseded as ambassador in Paris in September just before the outbreak of war. After the disaster of Jena on 14 October he had an interview with Geraud Duroc near Wittenberg to seek terms of peace. After two unsuccessful attempts at negotiation, the first draft being refused by Napoleon, the second by Frederick William, he joined the Prussian court at Königsberg only to learn that his services were no longer required. He then joined the court of Elisa, grand duchess of Tuscany, at Lucca and Florence, and after Napoleon's fall devoted himself to writing.

He published in 1819 three volumes, Salle cause et gli effetti della confederazione rizenana, at Florence, but revealed little that was not already available in printed sources. His memoirs remained in manuscript. His despatches are edited by Bailleu in Preussen und Frankreicli (Leipzig, 1887, Publikationen aus den preussischen Staatsarchiven).
