= Villa Torrigiani =

Villa near Lucca, Italy

Coordinates: 43°53′14″N 10°36′32″E

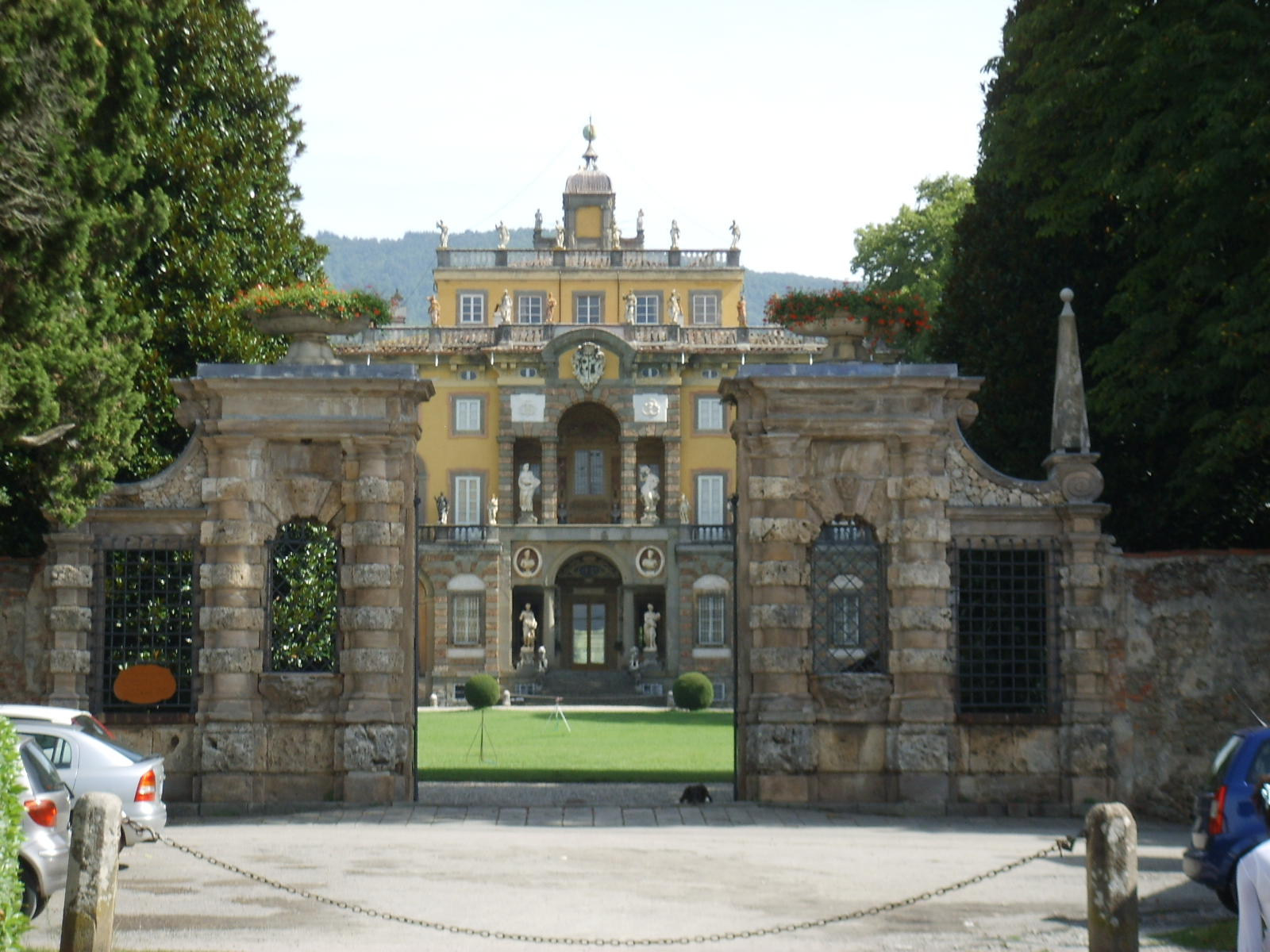
Villa Torrigiani

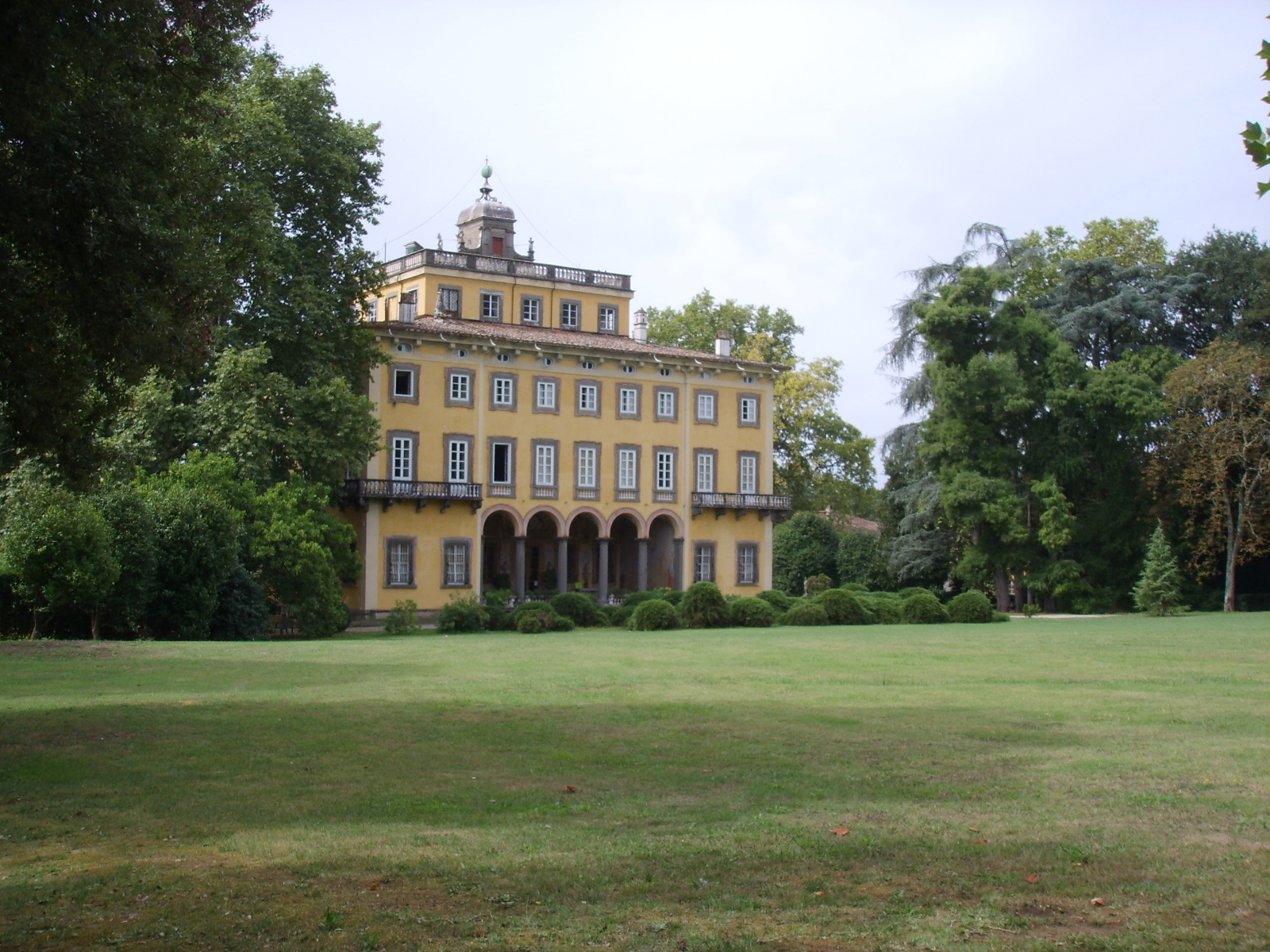
Back

The Villa Torrigiani is located in the hamlet of Camigliano, in Capannori (Lucca). It is a historical villa, dating from the second half of the sixteenth century.

== History ==
The first mention of the villa dates back to 1593, as belonging to the Buonvisi family. It was bought later by Nicola Santini, into whose family it passed.

Santini rebuilt the south facade in the Baroque style at the end of the seventeenth century, probably in imitation of the architecture of Versailles where he was ambassador to the Republic of Lucca. The rebuilding involved the addition of two wings to the villa, and the modification of the front by the addition of a massive scale range leading to a serliana, duplicated on the upper floor with two balconies, decorated with statues. He also laid out new gardens. At the front, parterres were arranged around two pools. At the rear, a fountain was built as the focus of the garden, and another sunken 'garden of Flora' was laid out to the east.

In 1816 Victoria Santini married into the eponymous Torrigiani family, who uprooted the existing garden to make an 'English style' park. Only the garden of Flora survived. Now the villa is owned by Fabio Colonna di Stigliano.

== Architecture ==
The villa stands out from other villas in Lucca and in Tuscany by the multicoloured facade of the main building obtained using different materials: stone grey and tuff alternating yellow pillars and arches, marble statues of white, ochre plaster at the bottom with the upper part in white. Even the use of parapets on the windows or openings are original elements, which are found also at the nearby Villa Mansi. The person responsible for this decoration was the Bolognese architect Alfonso Torregiani. The facade at the back is of late Renaissance style, characterized by a large portico of the Tuscan order.

Inside there is an elliptical staircase, decorated with stucco and other ornamentation. There is a private theatre.

== The park ==
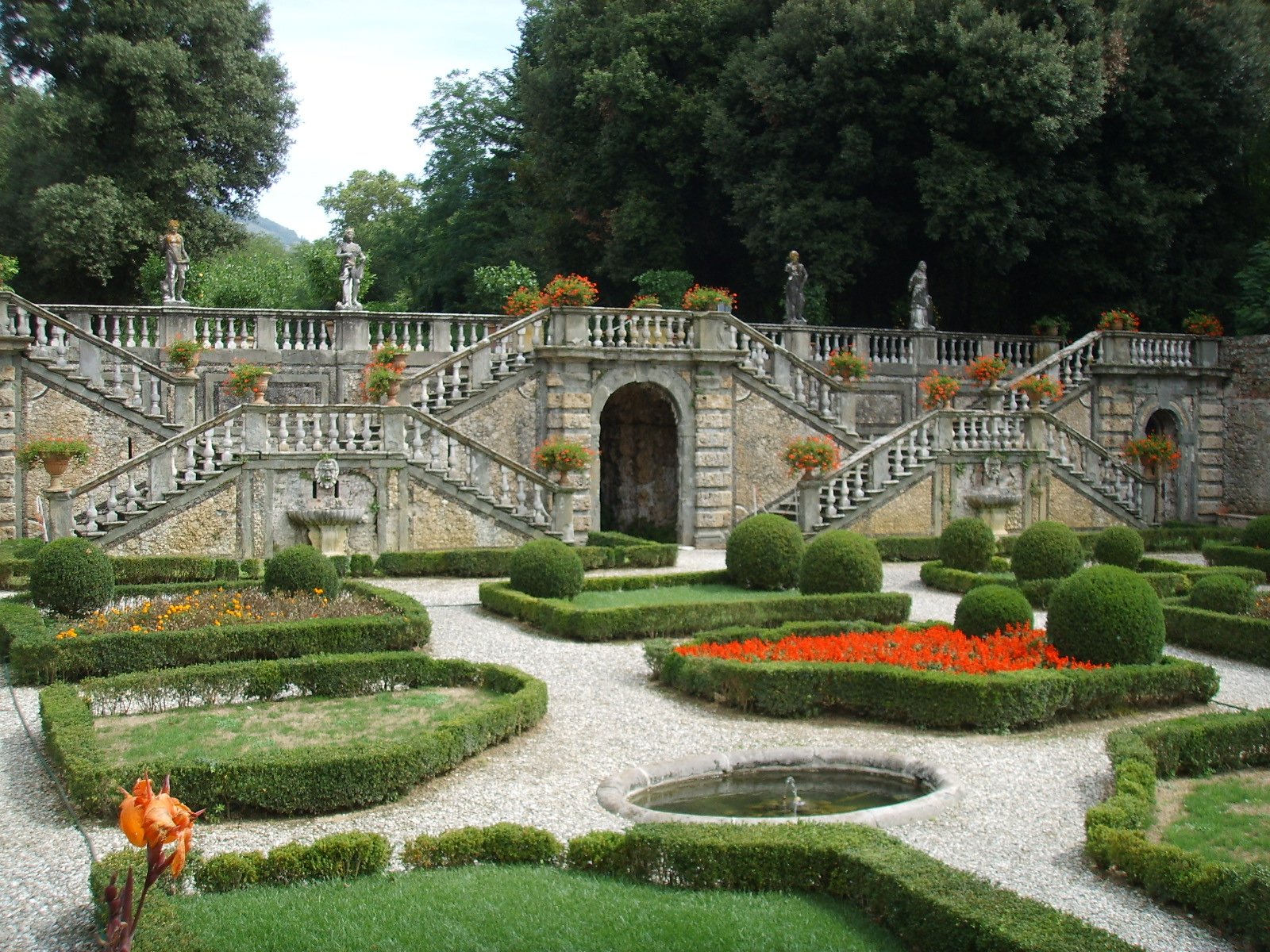
The secret garden and stairway concealing the nymphaeum

The surviving layout of the garden dates back to the Santini family in 1650.

The main axis of the villa is highlighted by a row of magnificent cypress trees, approximately 700 metres, which complement the facade of the villa. At the end of the avenue, near a majestic gate that enters the house, there is a small village, once intended for the servants.

There is a small garden, enclosed by a network and used as an aviary, a fish farm with jets of water, and the secret garden of Flora with an Italian nymphaeum. The heart of the park is the Nymphaeum of Winds, named for the statues personifying the winds, where the paths converge.

There are a number of giochi d'acqua by means of which the marquis would bemuse unwary guests, chasing them into the garden from the upper terrace. Once there, they would try to shelter in the Temple of Flora, only to find themselves soaked by water pouring from the domed ceiling.

In Florence the house at the Garden Torrigiani is sometimes referred to as Villa Torrigiani. At Scandicci (Florence) there is another Villa Torrigiani in Renaissance style, home today to a winery.

== Other pictures ==
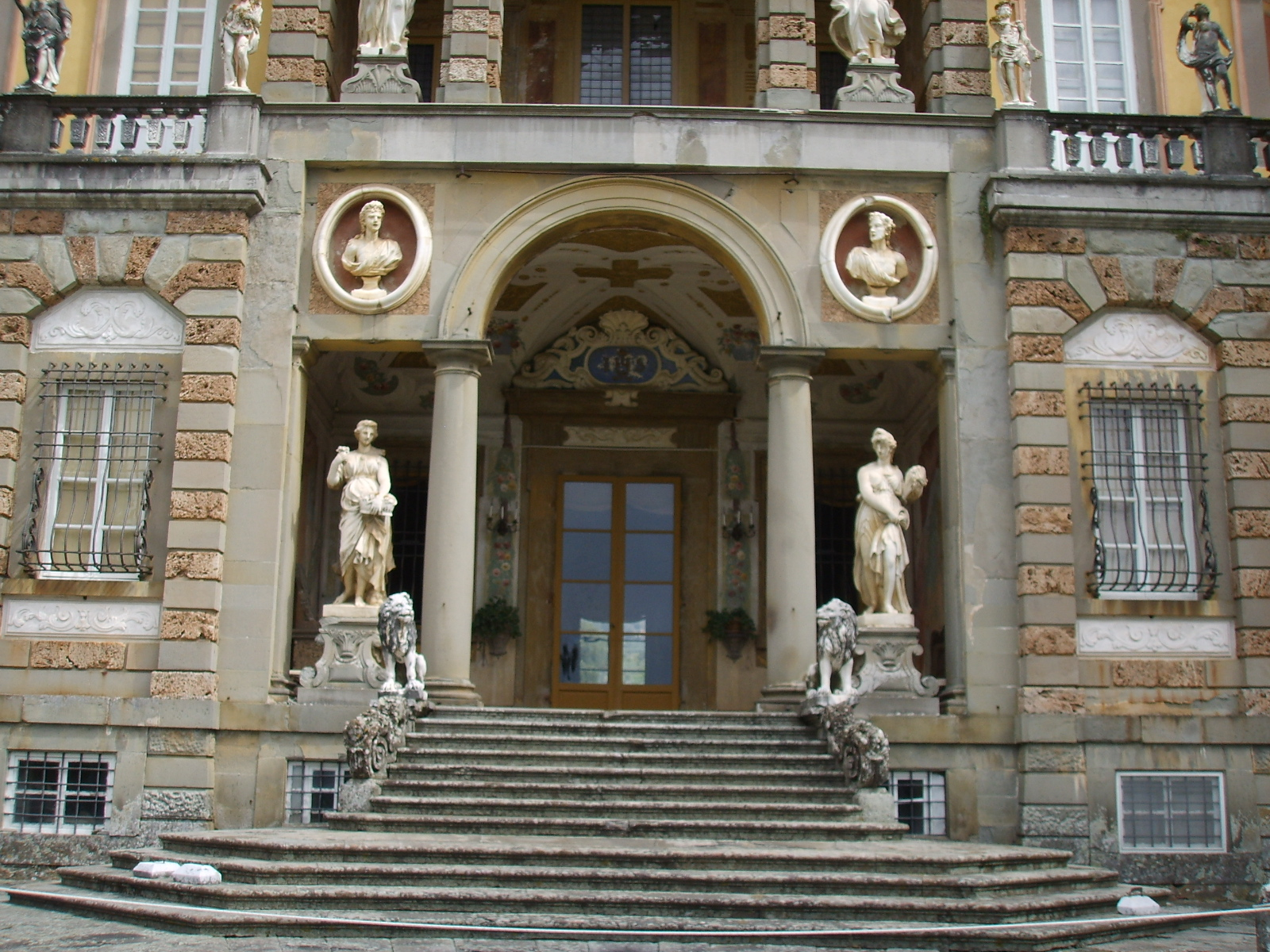
Façade detail

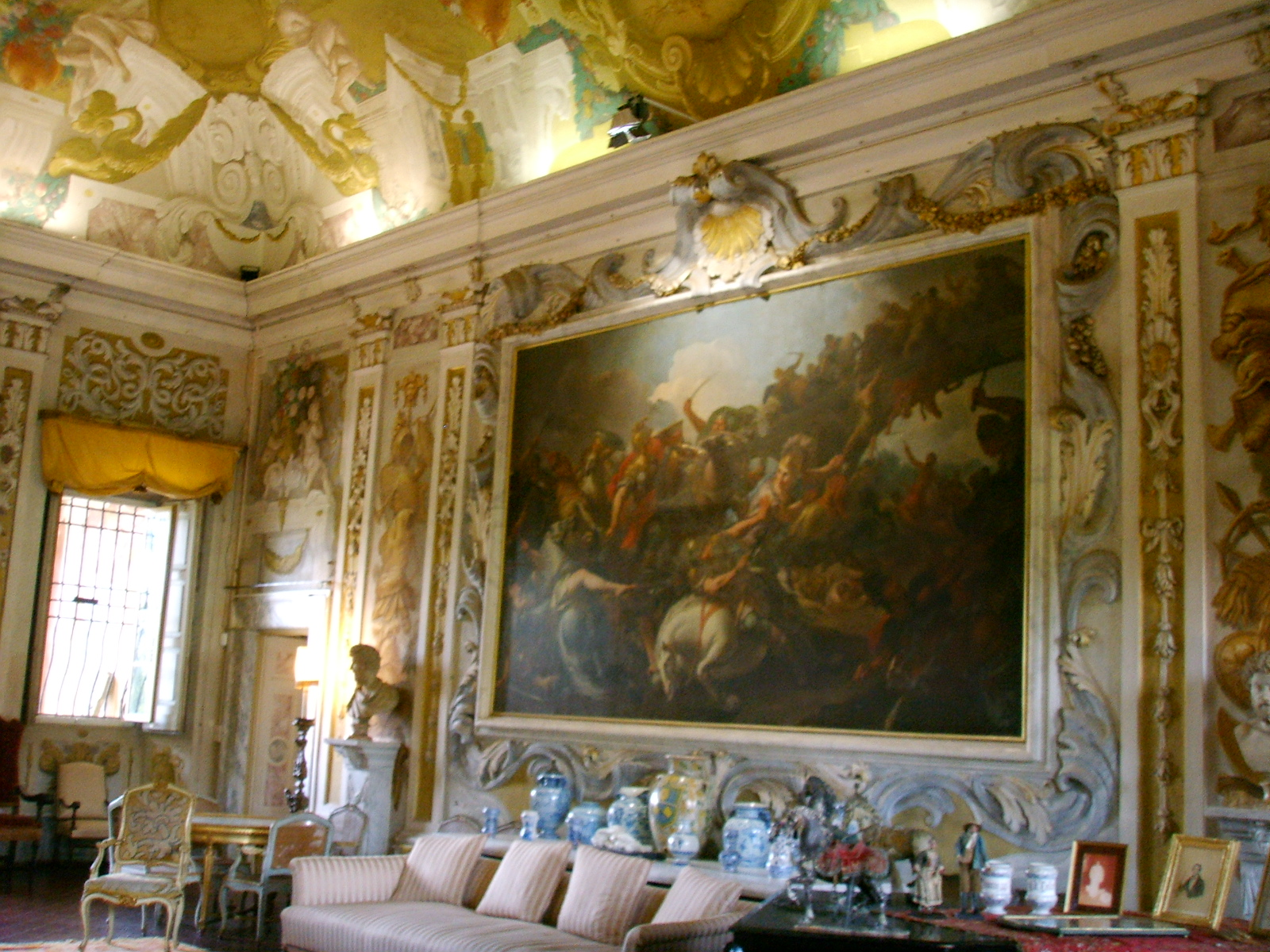
The central hall

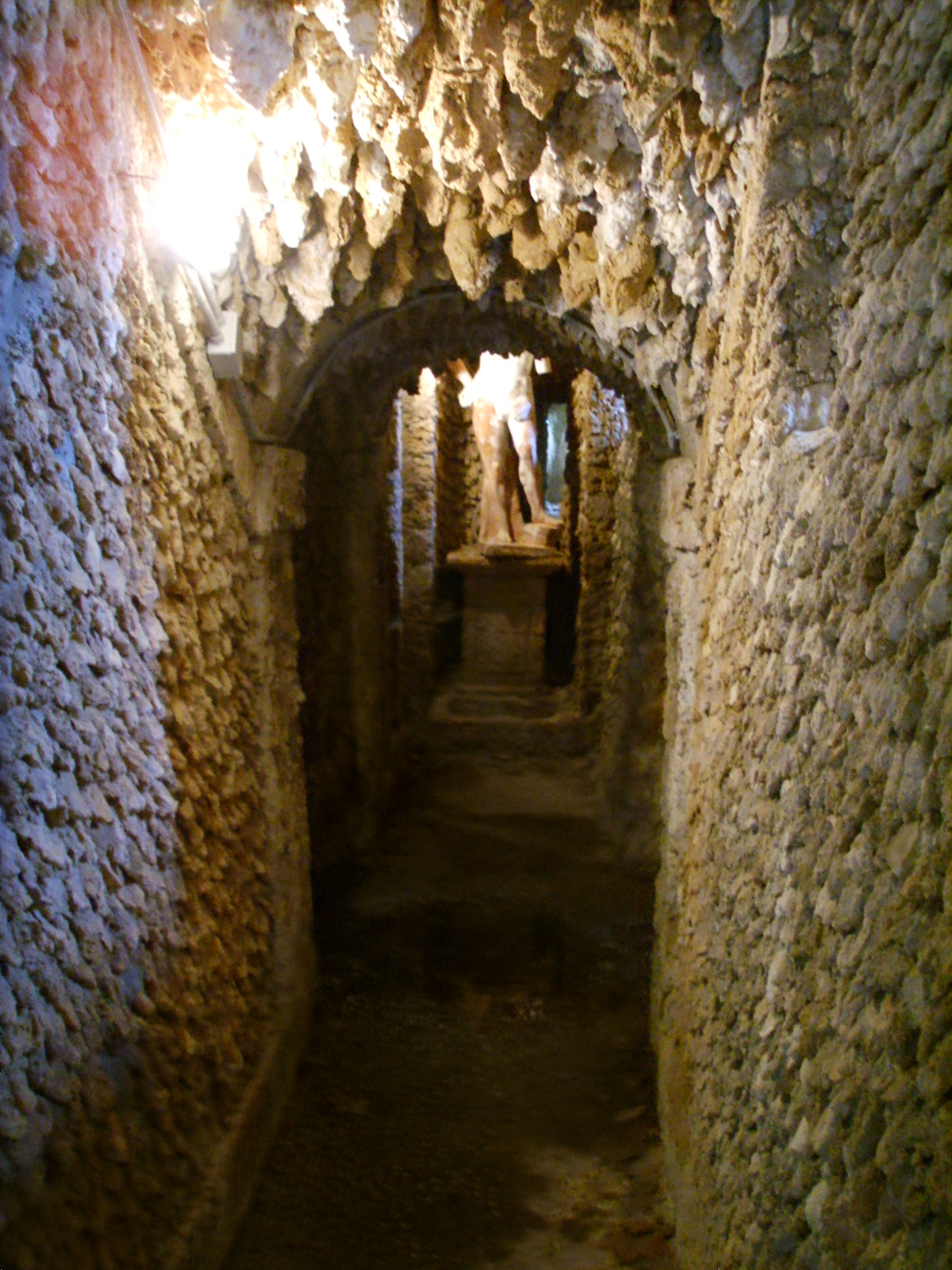
The Nymphaeum wind

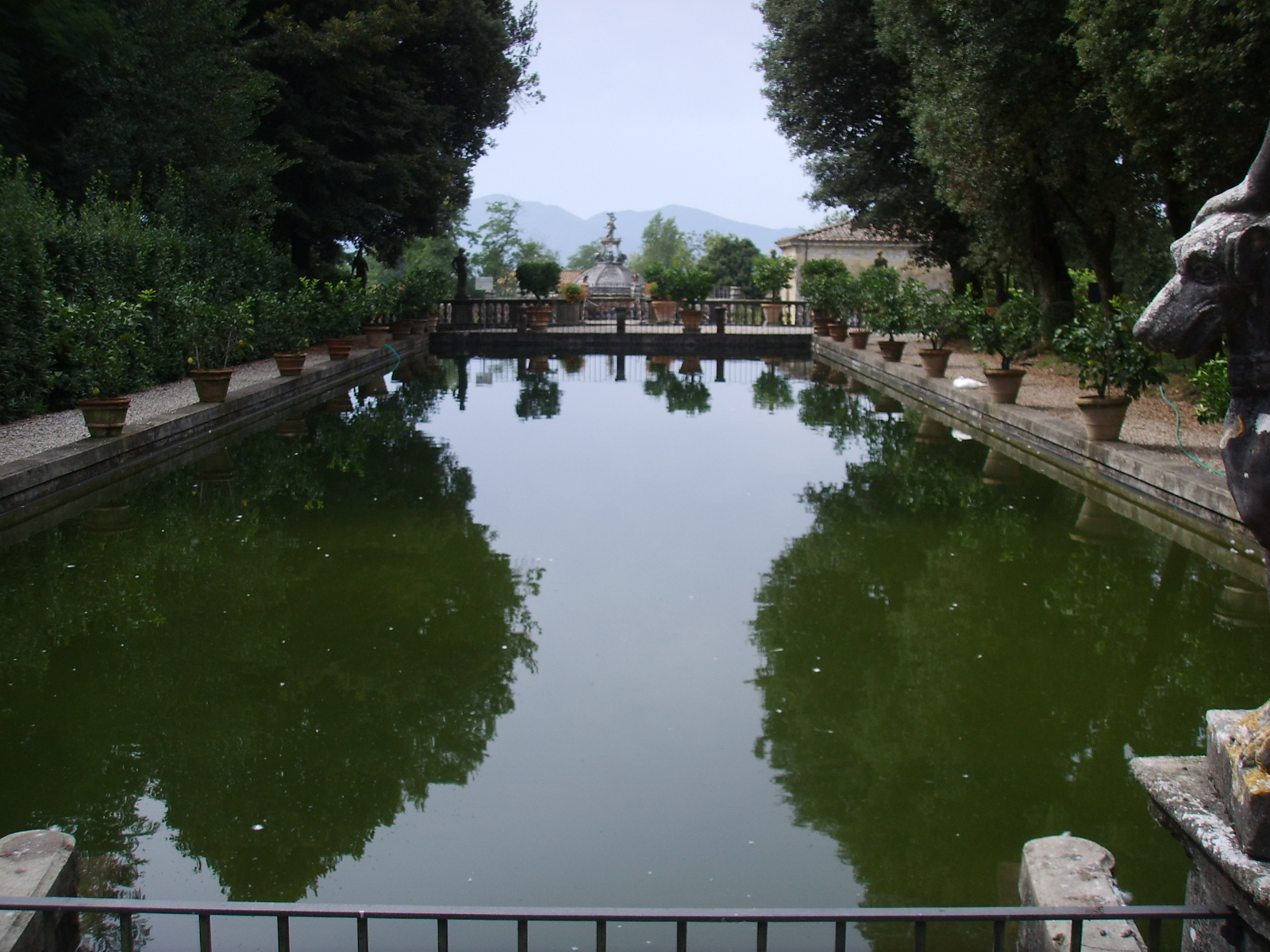
The Fishpond
