= Second Partition of Poland =

1793 division of Poland–Lithuania

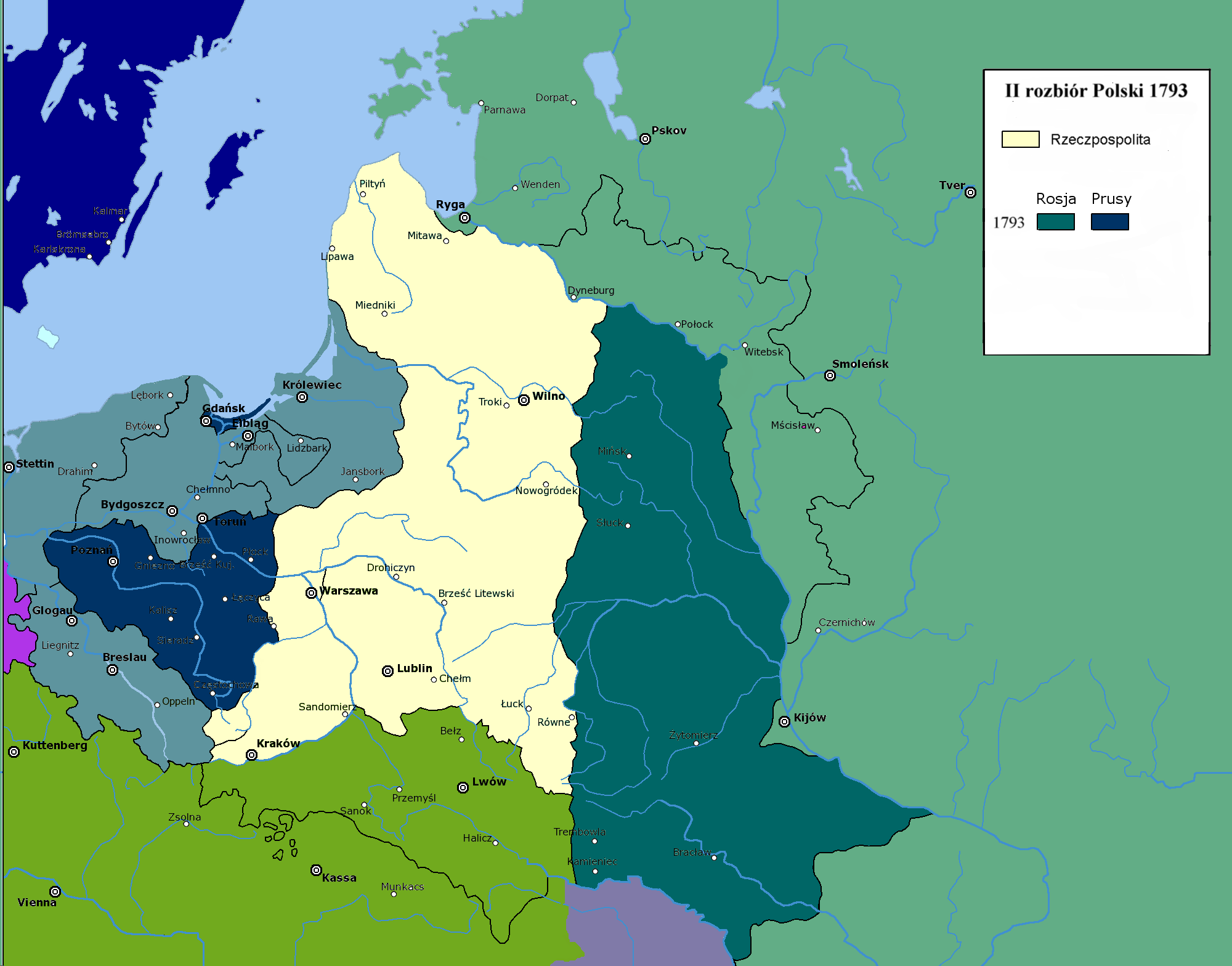
- The Polish–Lithuanian Commonwealth after the Second Partition (1793)
- Cumulative losses
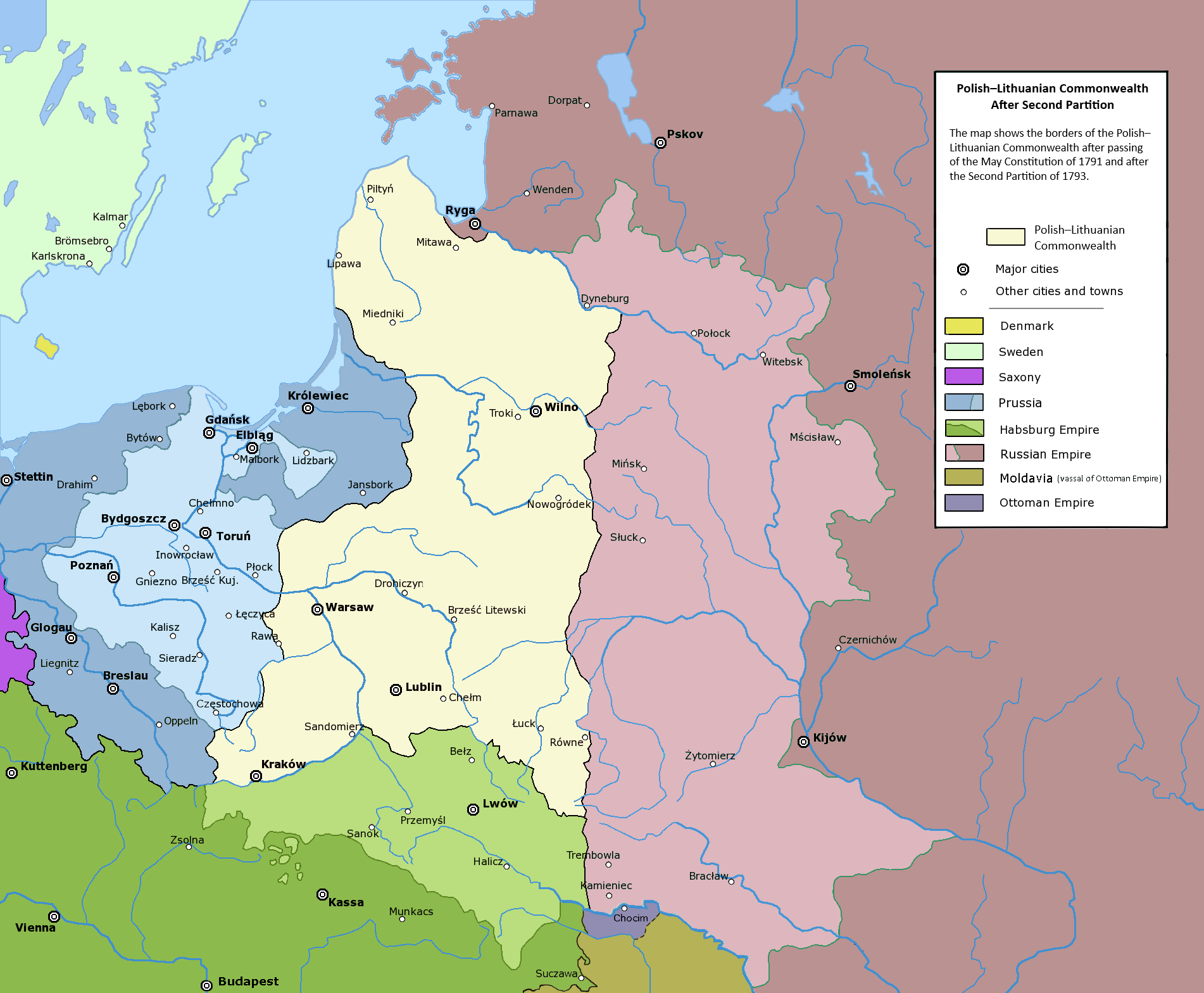
- The Polish–Lithuanian Commonwealth after the first two partitions

Territorial losses
- Total: 307,000 km^{2}
- To Prussia: 58,000 km^{2}
- To Russia: 250,000 km^{2}

The 1793 Second Partition of Poland was the second of three partitions (or partial annexations) that ended the existence of the Polish–Lithuanian Commonwealth by 1795. The second partition occurred in the aftermath of the Polish–Russian War of 1792 and the Targowica Confederation of 1792, and was approved by its territorial beneficiaries, the Russian Empire and the Kingdom of Prussia. The division was ratified by the coerced Polish parliament (Sejm) in 1793 (see the Grodno Sejm) in a short-lived attempt to prevent the inevitable complete annexation of Poland, the Third Partition.

== Background ==
By 1790, on the political front, the Commonwealth had deteriorated into such a helpless condition that it was forced into an alliance with its enemy, Prussia. The Polish-Prussian Pact of 1790 was signed, giving false hope that the Commonwealth might have at last found an ally that would shield it while it reformed itself. The May Constitution of 1791 enfranchised the bourgeoisie, established the separation of the three branches of government, and eliminated the abuses of the Repnin Sejm. Those reforms prompted aggressive actions on the part of its neighbours, wary of the potential renaissance of the Commonwealth. The Empress Catherine II was angered; arguing that Poland had fallen prey to the radical Jacobinism then at high tide in France, Russian forces invaded the Commonwealth in 1792.

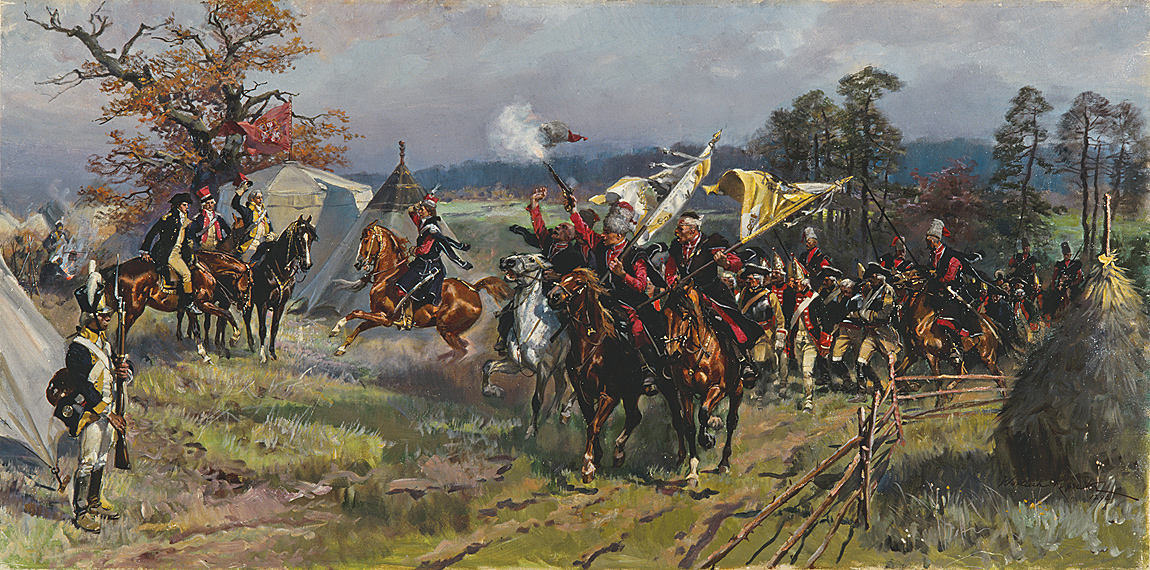
Scene after the battle of Zieleńce 1792, Polish withdrawal; painting by Wojciech Kossak

During the Polish–Russian War of 1792 in Defense of the Constitution, the Polish forces supporting the Constitution fought against the Imperial Russian Army, invited by the pro-Russian alliance of Polish magnates, known as the Targowica Confederation. The conservative nobility (see also, szlachta) believed that the Russians would help them restore their Golden Liberty. Abandoned by their Prussian allies, the badly outnumbered Polish pro-Constitution forces fought under Prince Józef Poniatowski a defensive war with some measure of success, but were ordered to abandon their efforts by their supreme commander, King Stanisław August Poniatowski. The King decided to join the Targowica Confederation, as demanded by the Russians.

Russia invaded Poland to ensure the defeat of the Polish reforms, with no overt goal of another partition (it viewed Poland as its protectorate, and saw little need to give up chunks of Poland to other countries). Frederick William II of Prussia, however, saw those events as an opportunity to strengthen his country. Frederick demanded from Catherine that for his country's abandoning Poland as a close ally, for Prussian participation in the War of the First Coalition against revolutionary France, because Russia had encouraged Prussian participation, and because Prussia had recently suffered a major defeat at the Battle of Valmy, Prussia should be compensated – preferably with parts of the Polish territory. Russia soon decided to accept the Prussian offer.

== Partition treaty ==
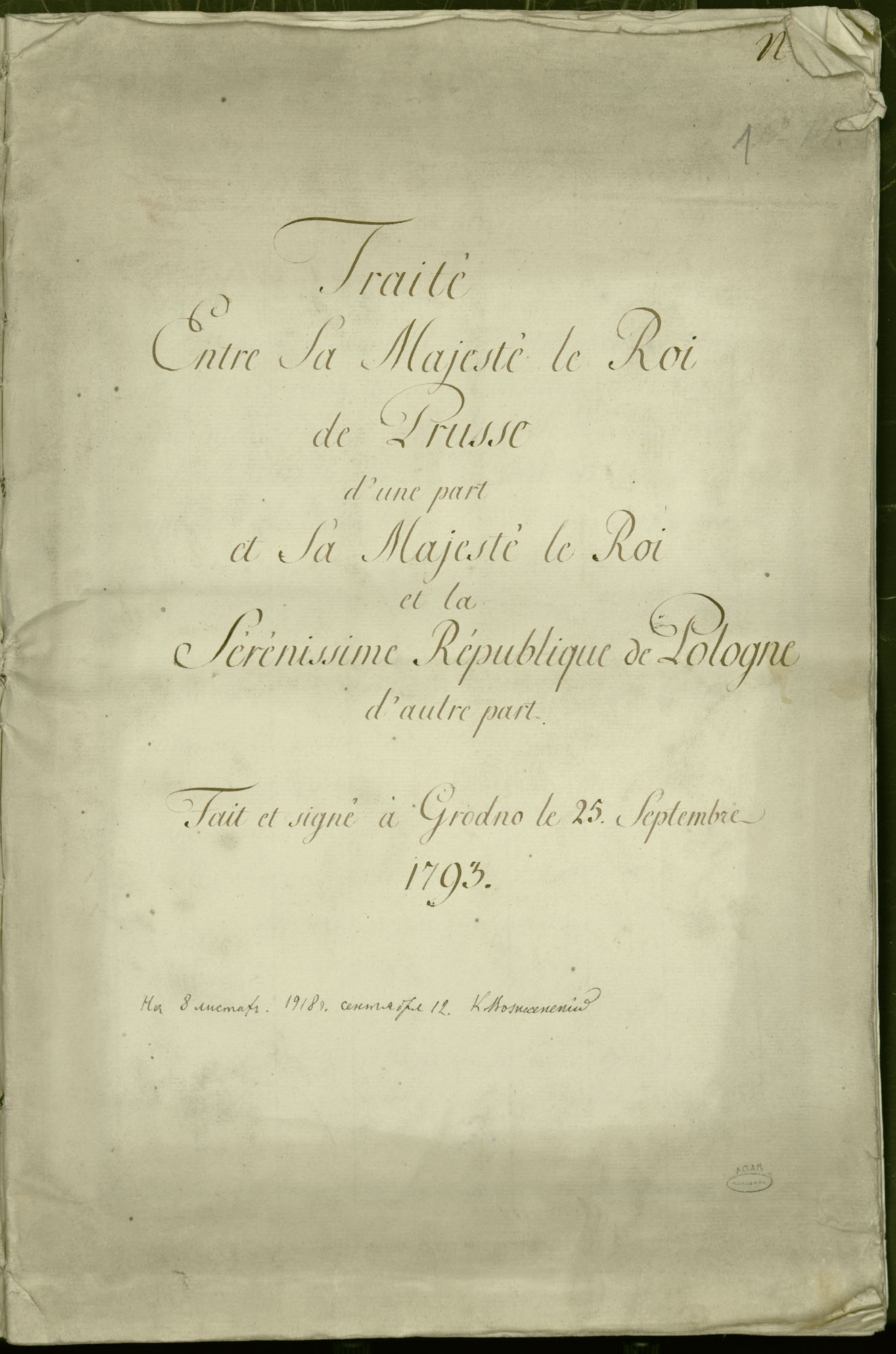
The Treaty of Grodno between Prussia and Poland (a French edition), later referred to as the Second Partition Treaty

On 23 January 1793, Prussia signed a treaty with Russia, agreeing that Polish reforms would be revoked and both countries would receive broad swaths of Commonwealth territory. Russian and Prussian troops took control of the territories they claimed, with Russian troops already present, and Prussian troops meeting only limited resistance. In 1793, deputies to the Grodno Sejm, the last Sejm of the Commonwealth, in the presence of Russian forces, agreed to the Russian and Prussian territorial demands. The Grodno Sejm became infamous not only as the last sejm of the Commonwealth, but because its deputies had been bribed and coerced by the Russians (Russia and Prussia wanted legal sanction from Poland for their demands).

Imperial Russia annexed 250,000 square kilometres (97,000 sq mi), while Prussia took 58,000 square kilometres (22,000 sq mi). The Commonwealth lost about 307,000 km^{2}, being reduced to 215,000 km^{2}.

=== Russian Partition ===
Russia received the Kiev Voivodeship, Bracław Voivodeship, Podole Voivodeship and Minsk Voivodeship, and parts of the Vilnius Voivodeship, Nowogródek Voivodeship, Brest Litovsk Voivodeship and the Volhynian Voivodeship. This was accepted by the Grodno Sejm on 22 July. Russia reorganized its newly acquired territories into Minsk Viceroyalty and Izyaslav Viceroyalty (which in 1795 was split into Podolian and Volhynian Viceroyalties).

=== Prussian Partition ===
Prussia received the cities of Gdańsk (Danzig) and Toruń (Thorn), and Gniezno Voivodeship, Poznań Voivodeship, Sieradz Voivodeship, Kalisz Voivodeship, Płock Voivodeship, Brześć Kujawski Voivodeship, Inowrocław Voivodeship, Dobrzyń Land, and parts of the Kraków Voivodeship, Rawa Voivodeship and Masovian Voivodeship. This was accepted by the Grodno Sejm on 23 September or 25 September (sources vary). Prussia organized its newly acquired territories into South Prussia.

The Commonwealth lost about 5 million people; only about 4 million people remained in the Polish–Lithuanian lands.

What was left of the Commonwealth was a small buffer state with a puppet king, and Russian garrisons keeping an eye on the reduced army.

== Aftermath ==
Targowica confederates, who did not expect another partition, and the king, Stanisław August Poniatowski, who joined them near the end, both lost much prestige and support. The reformers, on the other hand, were attracting increasing support. In March 1794 the Kościuszko Uprising began. The defeat of the Uprising in November that year resulted in the final Third Partition of Poland, ending the existence of the Commonwealth.

== See also ==
- Subdivisions of the Polish–Lithuanian Commonwealth
- Subdivisions of the Polish–Lithuanian territories following the partitions
- Third Partition of Poland
