= Regional Museum of Messina =

Museum in Messina, Sicily, Italy

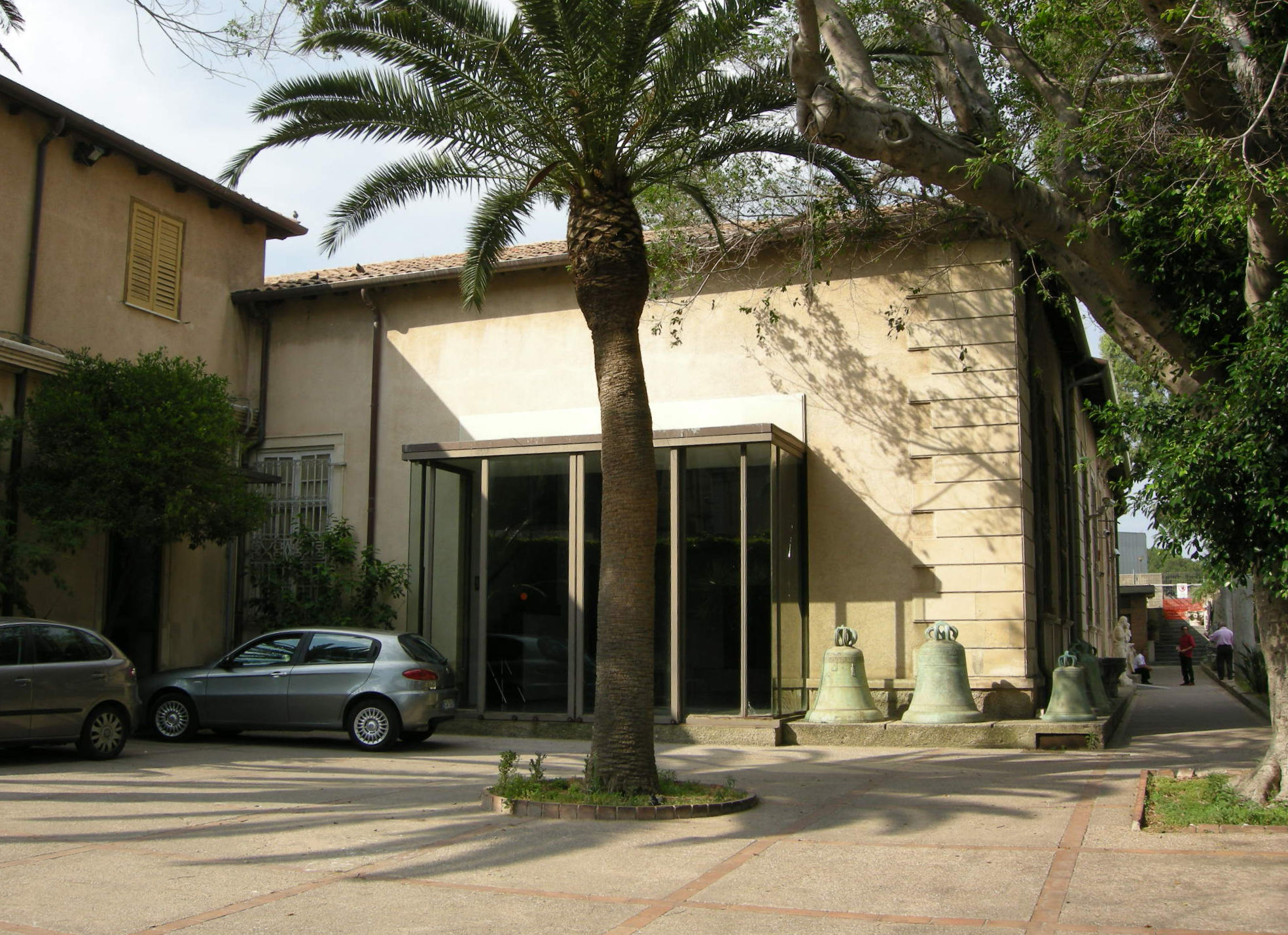
- Location: Viale della Libertà 465; Messina 98121, Sicily, Italy
- Coordinates: 38.216693°N 15.563947°E
- Director: Arch. Maria Mercurio
- Public transit access: Messina tramway: Museo; ATM bus: line 1-Shuttle and panoramic line 21
- Website: Museo Regionale Accascina Messina

The Museo Interdisciplinare Regionale (MuMe), or Regional Museum of Messina (Italian - Museo regionale interdisciplinare di Messina), is an art museum located on the northern coast of the city of Messina, Sicily, Italy. MuMe illustrates the development of art and culture in Messina from the 12th to the 18th centuries, with outstanding figures such as the renowned artists Andrea della Robbia, Antonello da Messina, Girolamo Alibrandi, Caravaggio (Michelangelo Merisi), and Polidoro da Caravaggio.

Until 2017 it was housed in the former Barbera-Mellinghoff silk-mill, a late 19th-century building chosen for it after the 1908 Messina earthquake. Since 2017 it has been housed in a nearby complex designed in the 1970s.

== Building ==
The building housing the museum was originally the Barbera-Mellinghoff spinning-mill, a late 19th-century construction chosen after the great earthquake of 1908 to be the site of the future museum, which was refurbished and finally opened in 1922. Over the years the building has been considerably restructured in order to guarantee the exhibits the best possible conditions for their preservation; the last major work was carried out in the 1980s. A new large complex of buildings near the present site was completed in 2010s.

== Collections ==
The original collections came from the Museo Civico. After the earthquake in 1908 these were expanded by the addition of paintings, sculptures and precious decorative works from damaged or destroyed buildings, thus creating a collection of paintings and sculptures by internationally known and local artists, together with a variety of other objets d'art.

== Exhibition ==
The museum was organized on historicistic principles: each area contains the most important works of the same period, regardless of their typological class.

- Rooms 1-2 works of the Norman-Swabian period
- Rooms 3-4 sculptures and paintings of the 15th and 16th century
- Room 4 "Saint Gregory Polyptych" by Antonello da Messina
- Rooms 5-8 Paintings, sculptures, funerary monuments and works of decorative art of the 16th century
- Room 6 "Scylla" by G. A. Montorsoli
- Rooms 9-11 17th-century art and culture
- Room 10 Caravaggio works
- Room 12 18th-century art and culture in Messina
- Room 13 "The treasury" silversmithry, cribs, church ornaments, pottery

== History ==
=== Origins ===
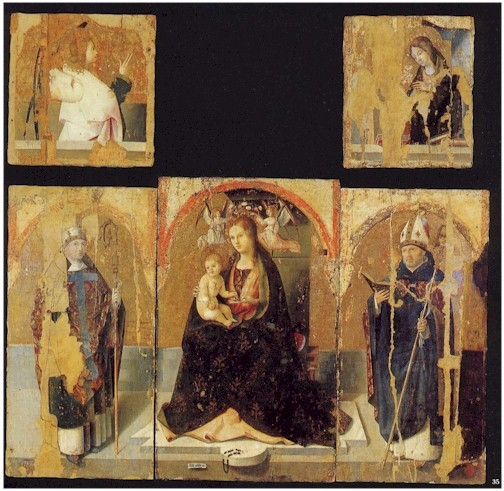
Antonello da Messina, Madonna of the Rosary

The first nucleus for the museum's collection came with various private collections of conservative taste. First opened in 1806 as the Museo civico peloritano by the Reale Accademia Peloritana "to end the despoliation of art", its formation was the idea of its first director Carmelo La Farina. It housed the Alojsio, Arenaprimo, Ciancialo, Grosso-Cacopardo and Carmisino family collections as well as a collection of 14th- to 18th-century paintings owned by the city's senate, which also part-funded its running costs.

It was initially based on via Rovere, near the Archivio degli atti notarili, before being moved to former university buildings, then (after its massive expansion from the collections of religious corporations suppressed by the 1866 liquidation laws) in 1884 to a building on via Peculio Frumentario and from 1891 to 1908 to the former monastery of San Gregorio.

=== The site of the former monastery ===
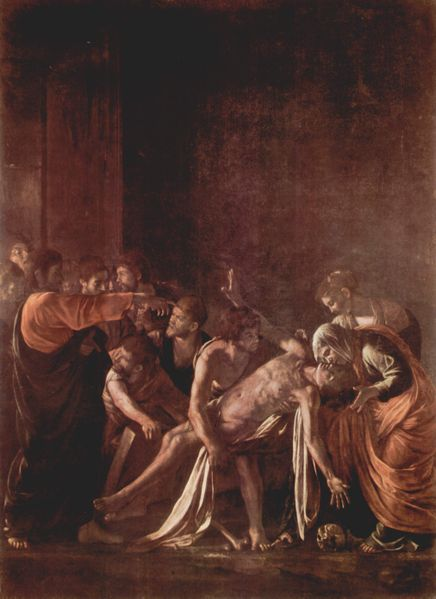
Michelangelo Merisi da Caravaggio Resurrection of Lazarus

In the rooms of the former monastery, following acquisitions and hereditary legacies, a copious amount of heterogeneous materials were formed and sedimented: in addition to the movables and objects of cultural use, coming from the ecclesiastical heritage, and the oil paintings from various eras and schools, also a rich numismatic collection, typologically classified into Mamertine, Greek and Roman Republican coins from the 2nd to the 1st century, mostly coming from the collection of Grosso-Cacopardo and his heirs purchased and donated to the Museum by the Municipality of Messina.

Also noteworthy are: the collection of seventy-four enamelled maiolica vases with reliefs – made between the end of the 15th century and the beginning of the following century, by the factories of Urbino, Casteldurante and Faenza – coming from the pharmacy of the civic hospital of Messina, a collection of arms, the complete collection of the Gazzetta Britannica, a newspaper from the time of Joachim Murat, various manuscripts, five Latin codices probably coming from the Benedictine Library destroyed in 1848 and, finally, a large number of engravings by Alojsio Iuvara, by Raimondi, parchments from 1200 to 1500, sarcophagi and marble sculptures from various periods.

This necessarily incomplete list of the collections contained in the Civic Museum, in addition to being justified by the loss of much material in the 1908 earthquake, also tends to underline what is peculiar to most post-unification Italian civic museums, that is, their functional specificity as places of storage and collection with essentially protective and representative purposes.

=== The Municipal Commission ===
The need for a more organic and scientific organization of the material emerged in the founding act of a municipal commission that met in 1890. This commission, which included Arenaprimo and Antonio Picciotto, the future director of the museum, among its members, drafted an initial report that same year, outlining the criteria adopted for the organization of the art gallery.

After considering the aesthetic value and the notable quantity of paintings from the Messina school, the report highlights the need for "this school to be represented with all its characteristic features and in its entirety in its development, gathering all the elements that are useful in revealing its artists, whether fellow citizens or foreigners, and in all its periods of splendor and decadence." Since it would be deplorable "if the Messina art gallery were to be proud only for the panels of the famous school of the Antonimi," it is necessary that "alongside the works of those greats, for reasons of art and history, there must be those of the mediocre, of those who suffered from their lack of talent, or who, while giving proof of it, were always overwhelmed by the bad taste of the era."

=== The exhibition criteria ===
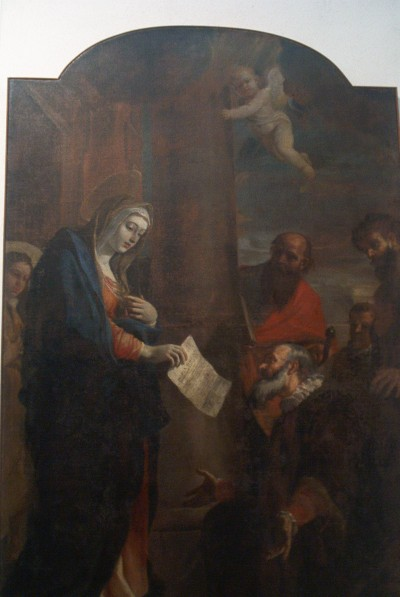
Mattia Preti Madonna della lettera

It is highly significant that, along with these exhibition criteria – which not only concern paintings of greater aesthetic value, but also take into account works classified as mediocre or from historical periods considered decadent (such as, for example, the Baroque taste of the 17th century) – the document highlights the educational and cultural function of the museum which "rather than focusing on curiosity with continuous links to teaching, must return to true educational utility, offering us, through monuments, paintings, and utensils, a complete and genuine image of the culture, art, and life of previous centuries." Selective criteria, however, resurface in the evaluation of contemporary art and genre painting. The former should be displayed "distinct and segregated," the latter so that it "forms a separate section."

Thus the suspicion resurfaces that the very display of works considered minor, a criterion in itself very noble, rather than deference to the historical rigor of documentation and respect for the work of art itself, hides with intellectualistic subtlety of the 19th century, the less noble intent, of making the "major works" stand out more; proof of this is that for the masterpieces "a so-called hall of honor will be established", a privilege and prerogative that still, in some museums, tend to separate and distinguish the excellent works.

La Corte-Cailler is also responsible for a manuscript work on the museum, as well as a series of articles published in various editions from 1902 to 1903 in the Archivio Storico Messina, in which he reports on new acquisitions and the definitive arrangement of the hall of honor. In the manuscript, the author, after some historical notes, describes the existing rooms and sets out, from a design perspective, a long series of works to be carried out for the construction of new rooms in which to accommodate the materials lying in storage and transfer the marble works still accumulated in the University premises.

The manuscript – published, as mentioned, in the magazine (under the heading "news") and in part in the daily newspaper Il Paese in 1908 – constitutes the first scientific and systematic work on the works contained in the museum, for which it includes the cataloguing card with particular attention to the paintings. It also provides biographical information on the artists for a total of one hundred and one biographies.

The lack of staff, the cramped spaces, and the overcrowding of materials, however, remained unsolved problems until, as La Corte-Cailler reports, the superintendent of museums and works of art of Sicily, Antonio Salinas, himself, outraged by the neglect in which the museum had been left by the Municipal Administration, signed a forceful protest to the Ministry of Education in 1907. A commission was then convened to study a permanent arrangement and the possibility of moving it to another location.

=== Earthquake and recovery ===
The rebuilding plans were cut short by the 1908 earthquake, in which the museum collapsed and some artworks were lost.

However, the renovation plans were thwarted by the disastrous earthquake of 1908, which caused the museum's collapse and the loss of several works. The exceptional nature of the situation, the improvisation, and the urgency of the intervention led to a selective approach to the recovery and first aid operations. The major works were placed indoors, while the others were placed in makeshift shelters and on the esplanade.

The need for rapid reconstruction was immediately felt and in 1909 the Inter-ministerial Commission, in a ranking of public works to be built, placed the Civic Museum in fifth place.

For two years, from 1909 to 1911, the recovery work of the collapsed material continued and was collected in rented warehouses in the area destined to house the new museum – the esplanade of San Salvatore dei Greci –, in the general in the warehouses of the Customs House and among the ruins of the church of Santa Maria Alemanna.

To much of this material, consisting of architectural and decorative fragments, the public authorities – as Superintendent Rao clearly denounces in a 1915 report – give a significant contribution "with the systematic demolition of monumental parts deemed a danger to public safety, even where they could have been saved, the art material found in the Museum's Depot comes either from the recovery made from the rubble, or from the demolition and dismantling of monumental buildings that could not be preserved".

In a letter dated December 28, 1912, Salinas commissioned the architect Francesco Valenti to draw up a project for the construction of a new museum in the Salvatore dei Greci area.

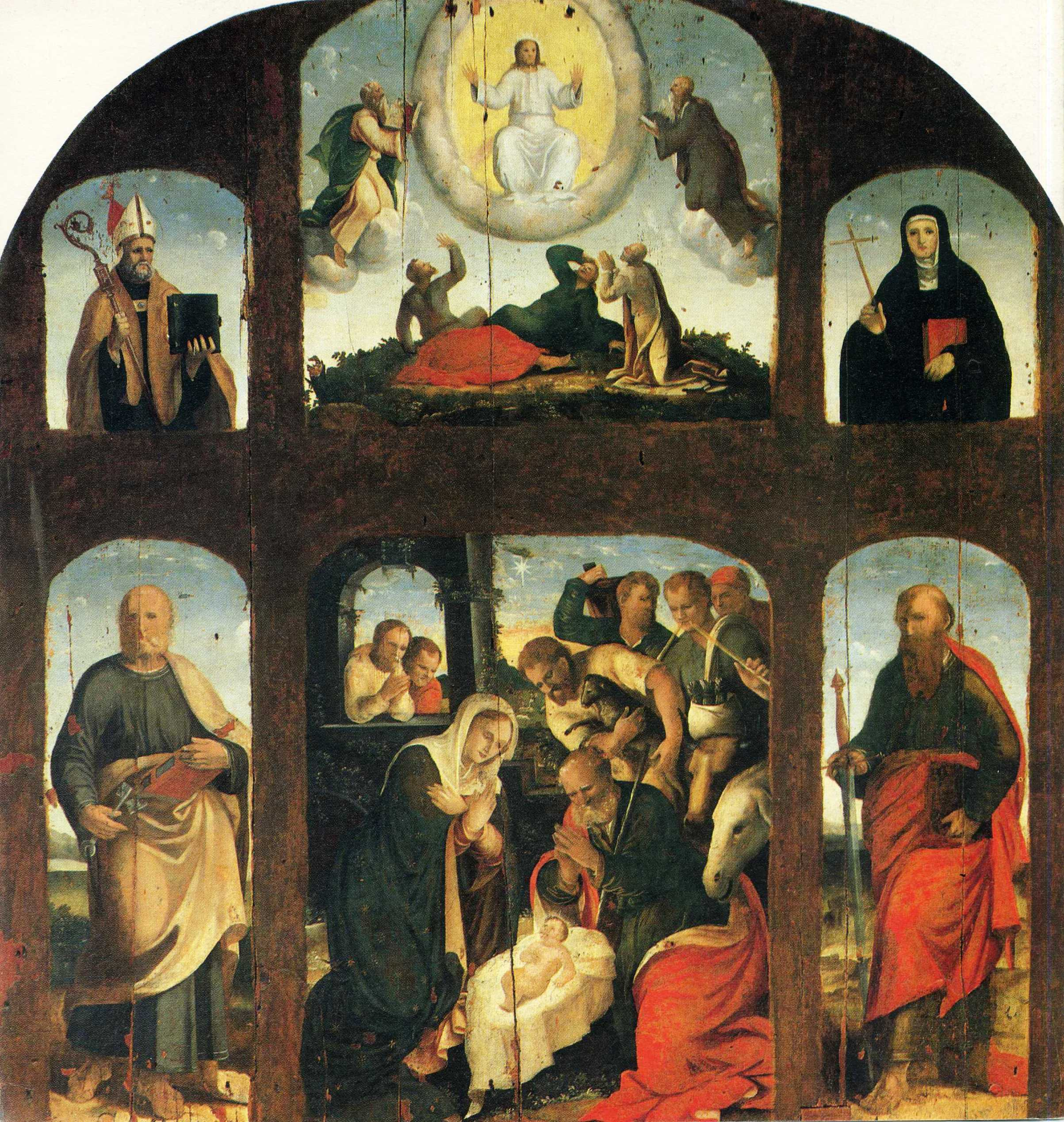
Unknown 17th-century Nativity and on the sides St. Peter and St. Paul, above Transfiguration, and on the sides St. Benedict and St. Scholastica Lentini Church of the Holy Trinity and St. Marziano

The project signed by Valenti and approved by Salinas included, in summary:

- a courtyard with the reconstruction of the cloister of San Domenico,
- two courtyards with elements of the cloister of San Francesco,
- a portico with columns from the University,
- chapels reconstructed with mixed marble from the churches of Santa Teresa, Carmine, San Paolo, Santa Caterina di Valverde, San Nicolò and the Oratorio della Pace,
- a chapel reconstructed with marble elements from the church of San Gregorio,
- doors from the University and Grano palaces, the churches of Santa Maria di Valverde, Santa Maria di Basicò and Santa Maria La Scala,
- original windows from the church of Montevergine and the Grano and University palaces,
- small windows from medieval buildings, etc.

Presented to the Superior Council of Public Works, the project raised some doubts of an exclusively economic nature, so much so that the superintendent of monuments of Palermo, who succeeded Salinas, Rao, re-presented it in January 1915, sharing its design approach.

After various bureaucratic hurdles, the project was approved in its general outline a year later. Resubmitted with the requested modifications in 1925, it remained substantially unchanged; one modification concerned the abolition of the chapels.

The permanent exhibition "1908 CittàMuseoCittà" opened to the public November 202 contributing to understanding of Messina before and after the 1908 earthquake.

=== Nationalisation ===
Meanwhile, in November 1914, a royal decree nationalized the Civic Museum. During these same years, the need for a definitive arrangement was recognized by many.

Enrico Mauceri, who became director in 1922, was responsible for the initial arrangement of the premises – although inadequate in the former silk mill –, the arrangement and display of the materials and a first inventory register.

=== 1939 plan ===
Mauceri's direction lasted until 1929, the year in which he published a short guide. In the following decade, nothing was done for the reconstruction. In 1939 Armando Dillon, superintendent of the monuments of eastern Sicily, was charged with drawing up a project to adapt the premises of the Monte di Pietà into a suitable location for the Museum. The approved project was about to be put into execution in 1941, when the outbreak of war blocked the work.

Since German and English troops were housed in the San Salvatore esplanade, the artistic material left unattended was subject to theft, as had already happened once before the war in 1939. At the end of the conflict, most of the movable works of art, housed in makeshift places, returned to the former silk mill building, but no inventory was carried out.

=== Post-war restoration ===
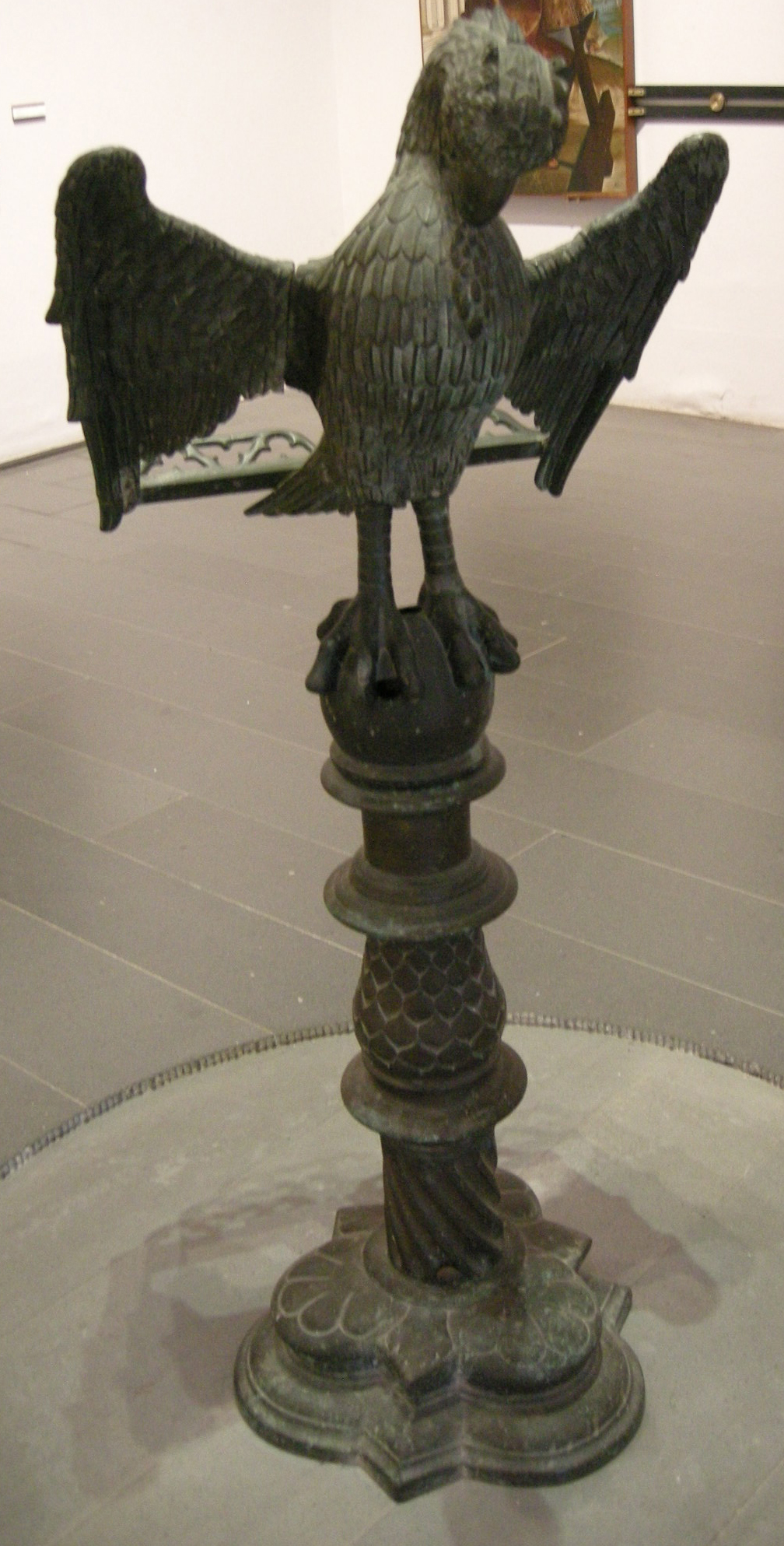
Pelican lectern of the Renan school, 16th century

In October 1949, Maria Accascina took over the direction of the Museum. During this period, a summary restoration of the building was carried out, a survey of the paintings (displayed in the rooms and piled up in the warehouses), the ceramics, the coins, and the sacred furnishings was carried out, and three sections were created for the exhibition: the art gallery, ancient, medieval, Renaissance, and Baroque sculpture. Finally, a selection of the materials in the esplanade was carried out, reconstructing portals and sculptures from the 15th century, and the photographic documentation of almost all the most valuable paintings and marbles was carried out.

In 1954, the Museum was thus able to reopen its doors, even if the problems of its definitive arrangement and those relating to security remained unresolved: for example, the discovery of a theft of paintings and their consequent replacement with fakes, which occurred in 1951, caused a great resonance in public opinion and a question to the Chamber of Deputies.

=== 1956 and 1961 plans ===
In 1959, the architect Aldo Grillo, superintendent of monuments of Lazio, following the assignment he had taken on six years earlier, presented a project to the General Directorate of Antiquities and Fine Arts of the Ministry of Education, for the expansion of the existing building.

The project, the first draft of which dates back to 1956, calls for the elevation of the current site and the construction of an additional structure connected to the pre-existing building by a gallery. In this complex, the basement level will be used for storage, the mezzanine level for a conference room, the first floor for an art gallery and offices, and the two floors above will be used for a restoration laboratory, storage, services, etc. The outdoor space will include a pavilion for temporary exhibitions and an open-air theatre.

The proposal by the architect Grillo – which encompasses materials and functions in a rigid structure, and seems to compromise the free and articulated rotation of the exhibition and, therefore, the mobility of the arrangement, the primary characteristic of a modern museum – was not accepted by the Ministry, which left the presentation in 1961 of a project developed by Franco Minissi without follow-up.

=== 1960s plans ===
From 1965 to 1967, a series of proposals substantially modeled on Grillo's project followed, presented by acting director Giuseppe Scavizzi.

The series of design projects culminated in 1968 with the development by Aldo Grillo and Giuseppe Scavizzi of a preliminary design, differing from previous ones only in terms of the greater space available. The project was to be financed by the Cassa per il Mezzogiorno and the Sicilian Region. However, the latter declined all liability.

That same year, director Giuseppe Consoli organized a painting restoration workshop.

Given the impossibility of raising the entire sum, in 1969 the Regional Department for Tourism of the Sicilian Region submitted a request for authorization to finance the construction in lots; however, this request was met with an unfavorable opinion from the Higher Council of Antiquities and Fine Arts; a year later the architect Grillo declined the assignment for the executive design.

=== 1970s plans ===
Around 1971-72, the Cassa per il Mezzogiorno allocated a sum of approximately one billion lire and the Ministry of Education entrusted the architects Scarpa and Calandra with the drafting of a building program for the construction of the new headquarters in the area of the San Salvatore esplanade. This program, submitted to the Ministry's Superior Council of Antiquities and Fine Arts, was approved.

After approximately three years, the preliminary design for the building was formalized. Its construction, due to the rising costs that had occurred in the meantime, would have required a cost of four billion. After the Cassa refused to contribute to the costs, the Museum, "regionalized" in 1977, was taken over by the Sicilian Region, which, in the winter of two years later, authorized the financing of the project.

This project envisages, as can be seen from the technical information provided by architect Roberto Calandra, a building consisting of a low central core, of a quadrangular shape, delimited on one side by a series of structural elements placed perpendicularly, suitable for housing service rooms, restoration laboratories and a library useful for consulting the rare manuscripts and codices owned by the Museum. The central body intended for the exhibition ends in a trilogy of apsidal elements.

The exhibition layout is structured as a series of dialectical-comparative itineraries of diverse materials, following a flexible and interpretive approach—thus allowing for the possibility of "borrowing" stylistic and formal relationships between the works on display from time to time—offering, even to non-experts, the most suitable interpretation for an immediate understanding of the complementarity of artistic phenomenological processes within the island and/or continental context at a given historical moment.

Furthermore, the simultaneous optical perception, through large windows overlooking the external area in front of the building, of the architectural fragments placed on inclined planes – "as if recomposed on a lectern" and placed next to each other (not welded) in such a way as to suggest the original compositional unity – would allow, in addition to the recovery of the architectural heritage, knowledge through comparative parameters of the changes in Messina's culture over the centuries.

The arrangement of the materials in a certain chronological order would act in a dual sense: internally, suggesting the routes, and externally, in the corresponding stages of the second circuit, allowing, for example, the observation of a 16th- or 17th-century painting beyond the stained-glass windows, while simultaneously enjoying the view of a Renaissance portal or a baroque architraved window. In this way, through the linking of the images of the figurative and monumental products, a unified visualization of a historical period and a culture would be created simultaneously.

At the end of the building, in the internal spaces delimited by semicircular walls that would allow for a plurality of observation points, the final works of a historical-cultural itinerary would be placed, without isolating them from the museum context (such as for example the polyptych by Antonello or the canvases by Michelangelo Merisi da Caravaggio).

In a slightly off-centre area of the exhibition hall, illuminated by skylights in a reciprocally illusory game of interior/exterior, Montorsoli's statue of Neptune would be placed, in an arrangement which – allowing, through intersecting planes, the enjoyment of a triple possibility of views, in a plurality of approaches, (from below as it was originally, at the height of the facial contours and from above) – comes close to the solution adopted by Scarpa for the arrangement of the statue of Cangrande in the restoration of Castelvecchio in Verona.

Finally, the area below would house the architectural and decorative fragments that could in no way be linked to new figurative entities. These, finally placed indoors, would not only be accessible to the eye, although separated from the walkways, but also be able to re-establish the internal/external dialectic with other monumental works located outdoors.

In 1977 responsibility for the museum passed to the Regione Siciliana and it took on its present name. In 1984 it was rearranged chronologically.

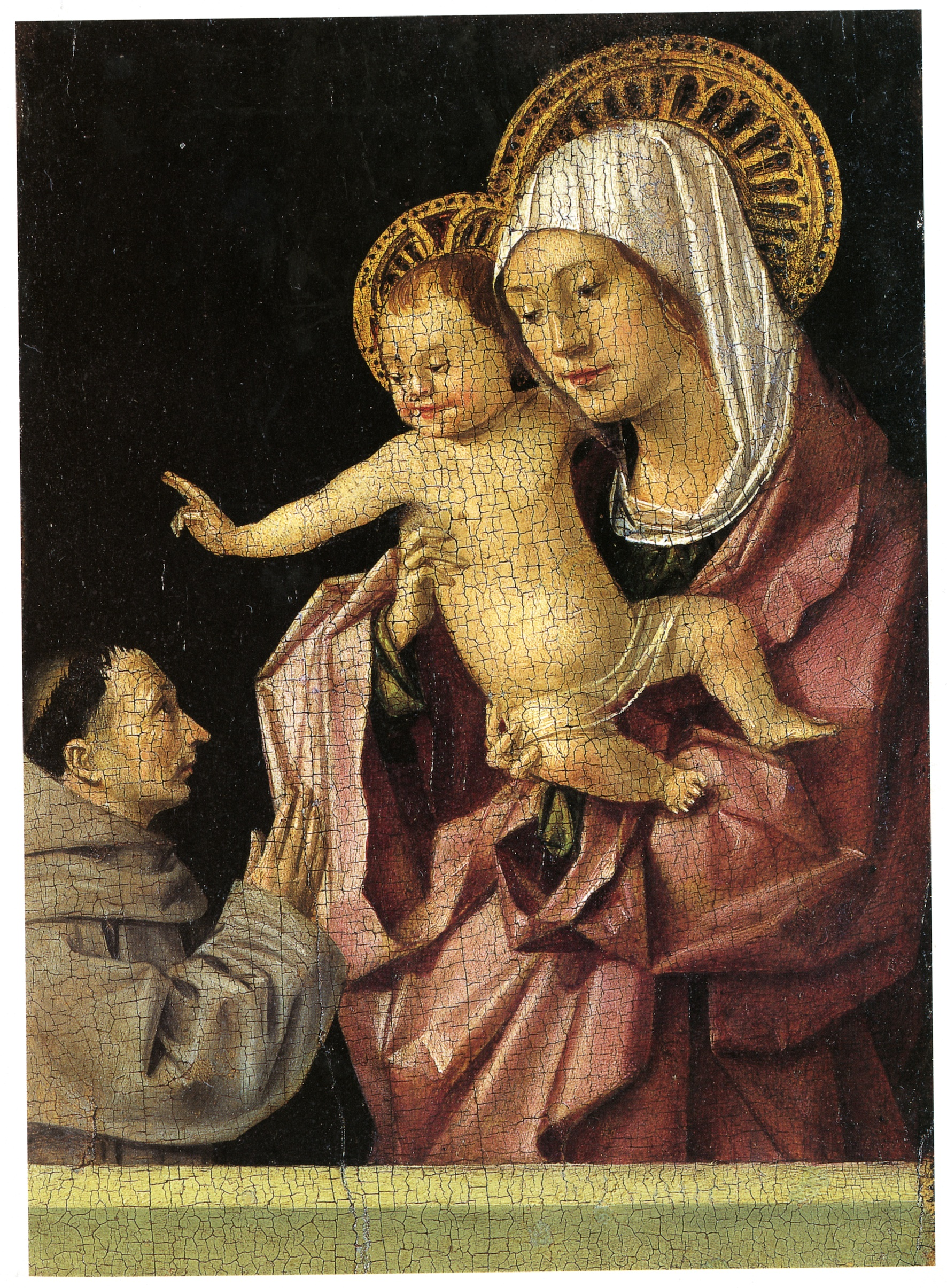
Antonello da Messina, Madonna with Child in Pieta

=== Basile-Manganaro plan ===
The Scarpa-Calandra project and the optimal solutions it proposed (among many, the recovery of the architectural heritage without the distorting criterion of restoration) were, however, never implemented.

Meanwhile, the judging committee, charged with examining the designs for the new Museum submitted to the tender-competition announced by the Municipality of Messina, approved the one signed by architects F. Basile and M. Manganaro, which is currently under construction.

While awaiting the final completion of the complex, the existing building was recently completely renovated, drawing on data and specifications from the Scarpa-Calandra master plan. The new layout, which internally renovated the old building, was overseen by Museum Director Francesca Campagna Cicala and architect Antonio Virgilio.

In the fourteen exhibition rooms, modern display criteria for the rich collection have been prioritized, rather than the previous classification of the arts by sector. In other words, a non-selective, but homogeneous vision of figurative art has been adopted, one that finally encompasses all genres and materials within the historical framework of art.

"The criterion," states the Cicala Campaign, "arises from the very nature of the museum's collections, whose heterogeneous provenance and differentiated collection criteria are fundamentally characterized as documentation of local artistic production and the history of culture and taste. In this way, the continuity of historical values is believed to acquire greater prominence, where the particular artistic interest that a piece may assume is not isolated, but dialectically placed to compose the recovery and valorization of a context—spatial and timeless—that produced them... (and) play a political and, above all, economic role of great importance within the Mediterranean Sea."

If "the Museum is nothing more than the apparatus that transforms the results of scientific research into general culture," the Messina Museum must also regain a pilot function of cultural aggregation and stimulation within the urban context.

In this regard, initiatives are planned by the director and aimed at stakeholders such as educational institutions, organizations, and associations.

The architectural renovation of the Museum consists of a rational internal layout that identifies uses and functions.

The basement houses the laboratory and an equipment storage room, the heating and electrical systems, the display bases for the statues of Scylla (monster) and Neptune, archaeological finds, and architectural fragments. The ground floor houses the offices, the library, the exhibition of archaeological and medieval, Byzantine, Norman, and Renaissance materials, the conference room, and the rooms named after Antonello and his school, the Flemish, Caravaggio, and Mannerist artists, in a layout that also leaves room for contemporary artistic expressions, from sculpture to the decorative arts.

The upper floor will also feature a display that, focusing on goldsmith's work, textiles, majolica, and other so-called minor art objects, will bring them together with the figurative art from the 17th to 19th centuries currently stored in storage.

However, in addition to these materials, numerous fragments of architectural and sculptural decoration from the civil and religious buildings destroyed by the earthquake also await relocation: columns, cornices, "mixed" decorated panels, statues, friezes, coats of arms, and heraldic insignia, currently lying in the outdoor spaces around the Museum. Sculptural reliefs, some from the Cathedral, bearing the mark of local stonemasons from the 12th and 13th centuries, a capital with stylized acanthus leaves, marble panels, holy water fonts, capitals, and a mortar with lion heads, have recently been placed along the entrance avenue.

=== Completion ===
The works, started in 1984, were completed in 1995, followed by further interventions, which ended in 2013, following funding of three million euros from the European Union. Although completed, however, the building opened to the public (initially partially) only on December 9, 2016. On June 17, 2017, the museum completed its opening with all its exhibition spaces renovated.

=== 2026 theft ===
On 15 August 2026, three panels of the San Gregorio Polyptych and a double-sided panel of the Madonna with Child and Christ in Pietà, all attributed to Antonello da Messina, were stolen from the museum in an overnight heist. According to the museum's director Marisa Mercurio, the theft was thought to have occurred around 21:50 local time. For some reason, the theft did not trigger the museum's alarms. Mercurio described it as "a great loss for the museum, for the city, the community and the art world".

== Collections ==
The museum illustrates the course of figurative art in Messina from the 12th to 18th centuries, including paintings, sculptures and decorative art in chronological sequence. Their artists include Antonello da Messina, Mattia Preti, Caravaggio, Girolamo Alibrandi, Vincenzo Catena, Annibale Carracci and Francesco Laurana.

From the precious cathedral treasury come the 'flowering branch' in gold, enamel, pearls and emeralds from a late 17th-century goldsmith in the city, though only the early 14th- and 17th-century Sicilian jewels from the two crowns of the sacred images are displayed.

=== Marble work ===
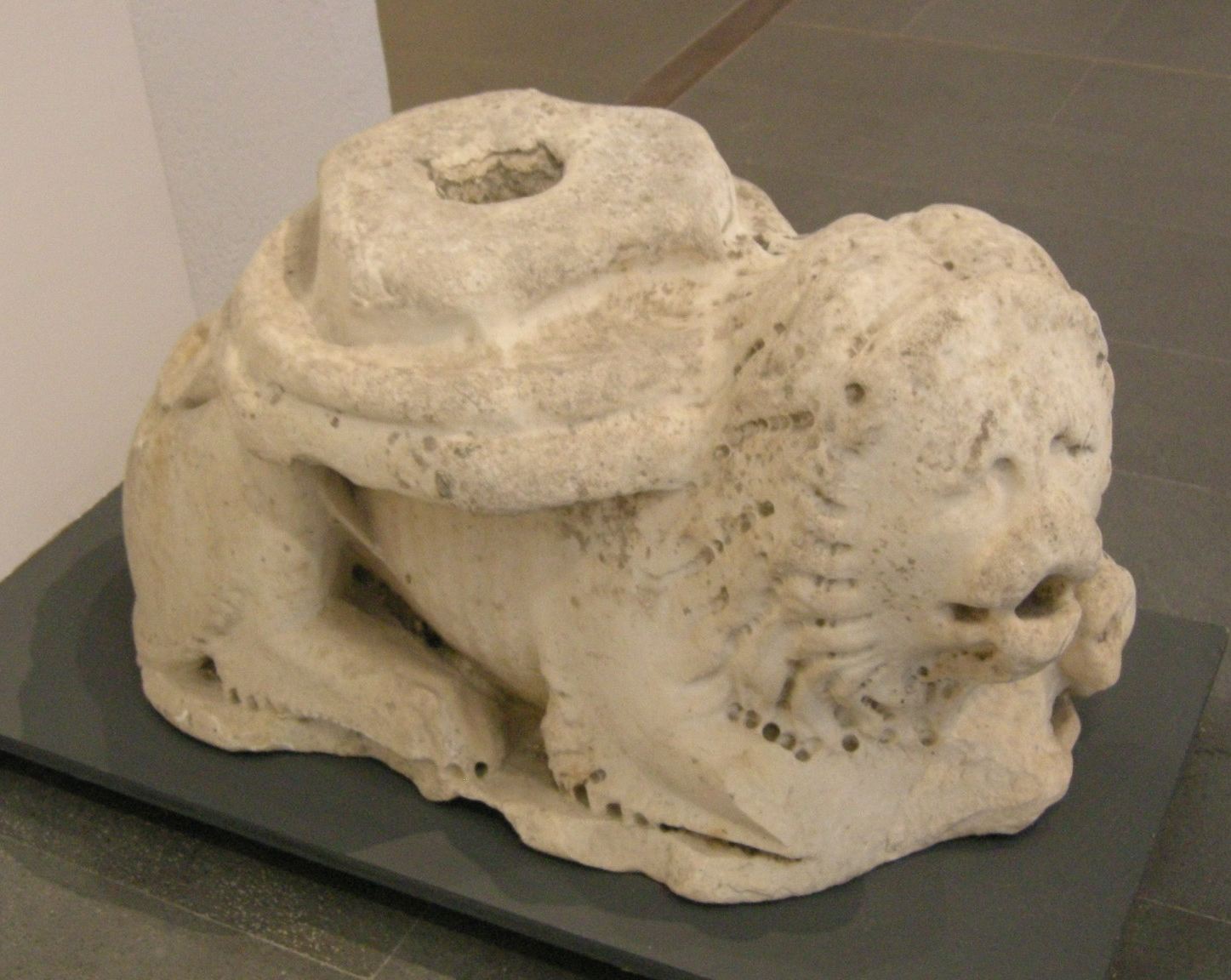
Column-bearing lion. Anonymous artist, 12th-13th century.

The Museum houses notable examples of marble production. The cylindrical capital with acanthus leaves, palmettes, and volutes, and the Corinthian capital with tracery and geometric friezes of lozenges in the abacus, are by Byzantine craftsmen.

The pair of pilasters with Kufic inscriptions and phytomorphic motifs is attributed to artists of the Norman period (11th century). A century later, the Gandolfo baptistery, signed and dated (1134), with four small heads worked in the round, was created. Also from the same period, the marble capital with acanthus leaves and tendrils is attributed to Norman craftsmen, while the capital with birds and human faces is Gothic (art).

From the church of San Nicolò and attributed to local 15th-century craftsmen, the holy water stoup with half-length depictions of saints along the outer band is also on display.

Furthermore, in the internal atrium of the Museum, several portals from destroyed churches have been reconstructed, such as the 14th-century portal of the church of Santa Maria della Scala, with vine shoots and bunches of grapes on the jambs and in the architrave. The portal, with fluted columns on a high base decorated with a grotesque motif and phytomorphic scrolls, the sarcophagus, with zoomorphic and ribbon-like ornamentation alternating with herms, and the marble tombstone with sea monsters date to the 16th century and display a distinctly late-Mannerist taste.

Of particular note are the "mixed marble panels," the work of craftsmen from Messina, who combined the local chromatic and illusionistic perspective experiences of Roman and Neapolitan Baroque with local tones. A notable quantity of these polychrome marble inlays, a vestige of the decorative richness of the interiors of the city's churches since the early 17th century, was collected in the Museum after the 1908 Messina earthquake.

=== Inlays ===
Messina was probably the first Sicilian city to host Byzantine artisans skilled in inlay work, in which the "mischio" technique was used to compose elaborate designs. This consisted of inserting flakes and tesserae of marble of different colors (mostly of local origin) and a particular bluish glassy substance typical of the Messina area.

The examples of marble inlay in the Museum come largely from the destroyed churches of San Nicola and San Gregorio: the "inlaid columns" along the shaft and base (17th century), the frontal with floral motifs, birds, and the bishop's coat of arms in the center within two panels bordered by bands of contrasting colors, the group of marble inlay panels with lapis lazuli and vitreous paste stones, and the panel with a large heraldic emblem.

Two "inlay panels" also date to the first half of the 17th century: one with a perspective motif, a laid table, and a paneled floor, and the other with a central fountain and leaping fish (currently stored).

Finally, a wall panel with inlaid marquetry and illusionistic effects is exhibited, depicting a revolving cloister door on whose shelves are placed various everyday objects.

=== Woodwork ===
The wooden material includes the 13th- and 14th-century tempera painted beams from the ceiling of the Messina Cathedral, depicting "Warrior Angels," "Saint George," and "Jonah Emerging from the Whale's Mouth."

Also on display are works created using the mosaic technique by Messina mosaicists: the "Madonna Enthroned," from the Angevin period, but with a Byzantine influence in its "shining gold" (Consoli), and the 13th-century "Madonna della Ciambretta," a work by Byzantine and local craftsmen working together at that time.

The Stationary Cross, attributed to the workshop of Giunta Pisano, also dates back to that period. There is also a polychrome wooden crucifix, probably by a mid-15th-century artist. Another exhibit on display is the funerary ark of Francesca Lanza Cybo (1618) in gilded bronze, marble, wood and embossed copper.

=== Church furniture ===
Among the sacred furnishings, noteworthy are: an unpublished gradual from 1481 by a Dalmatian friar, coming from the church of Santa Maria di Gesù Inferiore, the tunic with embroidery of peacocks, heads and birds in polychrome silk on an ivory background, the 17th-century antependium known as the Ciambretta worked with embroidery in gold and silver threads, beads, corals and semi-precious stones, the 18th century antependiums in silver plate and embossed copper, the 17th-century processional cross with the Crucifix and the Immaculate Conception in embossed and chiselled silver plate, the reliquary arm of Saint Albert from the 16th and 17th centuries, the cross-shaped reliquary in silver and rock crystal, the 18th-century monstrance in silver and gilded copper with a globe surmounted by a pelican.

Also made by 15th-century Messina craftsmen are the bronze processional cross with figures of prophets and saints engraved on enamel, and the pyx, dated 1614, crafted in repoussé and chasing, both unpublished.

From the workshop of Francesco Donia comes the chalice, dated 1667, richly crafted with winged heads, ovoid shields, scrolls alternating with crowns, and lanceolate leaves on the base's edge. The gilded silver tiaras from the 16th and 17th centuries are also the work of local craftsmen. Finally, also from the second half of the 17th century and originating from the church of San Paolo, is the valuable bronze and coral cross, which has many similarities with similar examples from the Trapani school.

Not on display but still worth mentioning are the frontal - in embossed silver plate with all-round reliefs of crown-holding angels with scenes from the life of Saint Benedict within a central polylobed panel and portraits of Saints of the order in oval medallions (1714) - and the head of a Saint (Camillus or Gaetano) in silver finished with a burin from the 18th century.

The pillory of the Messina Senate, coming from the Palazzo Senatorio, has found an excellent location. It is carved and worked in the round with gilded wood friezes, a valuable work by Domenico Biondo, with scenes painted in fresco by Letterio Paladino (1742).

=== Other valuable works ===
The following valuable works are on display in the rooms currently being set up on the upper floor:

- the silver altar card dated 1693,
- the chiseled gilt silver peace sign depicting the Pietà (17th century), the silver, crystal, and gilt bronze reliquary with silver winged heads (17th century),
- the majolica tile (17th century) depicting Saint John the Baptist,
- the walnut casket with mother-of-pearl and ivory inlays (18th century),
- the carved and gilded console table with a gilded globe (18th century),
- the alabaster statuette of Saint Michael the Archangel (18th century),
- the embossed silver ciborium door depicting the Supper at Emmaus (18th century),
- the silver and rock crystal reliquary (17th century),
- the vase of Caltagirone and the polychrome majolica,
- the silver chalice with turned stem (17th century),
- the monstrance in silver and gilded copper with angel holding the sphere, gilded copper rays and bronze cherubs (18th century), and so on.

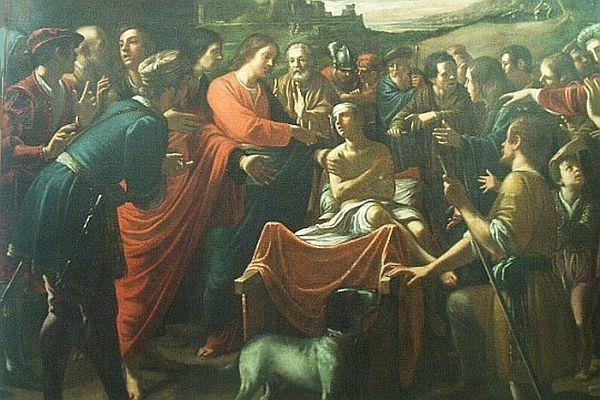
Mario Minniti Miracolo della vedova di Naim

However, to display all this and other material preserved in the warehouses, simply renovating the existing building is not enough; the opening of the permanent facility is essential, provided that it meets—without prejudice to the essential functions of conservation, protection, and documentation—the needs of a layout according to current exhibition methods and the criteria for the distribution of internal spaces.

In this way it will not only be possible to compare the decorative works of art with the figurative ones, from the Flemish school panels to the polyptych by Antonello da Messina, from the Montorsoli sculptures to the canvases by Michelangelo Merisi da Caravaggio, but – once relationships of complementary knowledge have been established – finally recompose the historical-cultural fabric of the territory into a unitary solution.

The museum provides courses in order to train professionals in restoration of artifacts and artwork.

=== Paintings ===
Caravaggio

- Adoration of the Shepherds
- Raising of Lazarus

Antonello da Messina

- San Gregorio Altarpiece
- Madonna and Child with a Franciscan

Colijn de Coter

- Deposition

Mattia Preti

- Madonna of the Letter

Mario Minniti

- The Widow of Nain
- Beheading of St John the Baptist
- Circumcision of Christ
- Madonna of the Rosary

Antonello de Saliba

- Madonna with Jasmine
- St Dominica
- St Catherine of Alexandria

Girolamo Alibrandi

- Last Judgement

Alessandro Allori

- Madonna dell'Itria (Our Lady of the Way)

Letterio Subba

The Goddess Calypso Welcoming Telemachus

Cupid and Psyche

Orion, Founder of Messina The Nymphs Lapizia and Fetusa Receiving the First Hare Killed by Orion

Foundation of the Compagnia dei verdi

L'Addolorata

Mary Magdalene at Christ's Feet

Nativity of the Virgin

Embassy of the citizens of Messina to the Virgin Mary

Matthias Stomer

Mucius Scaevola in the Presence of Lars Porsena

Adoration of the Shepherds

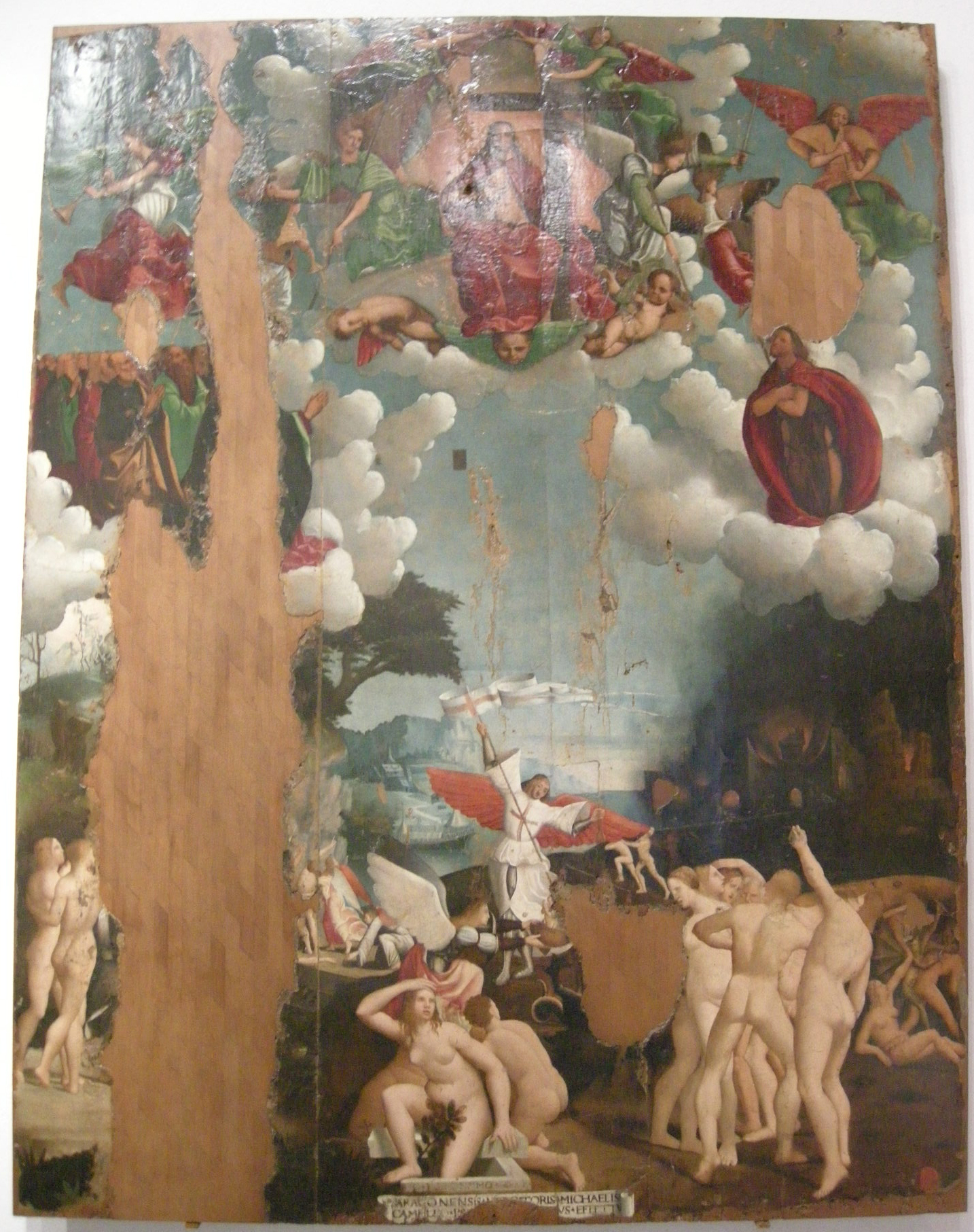
Girolamo Alibrandi, Last Judgement

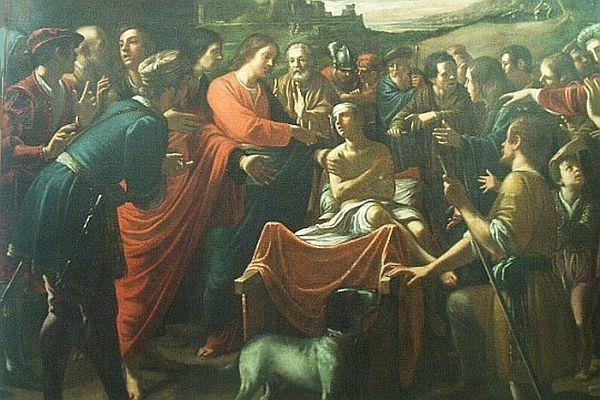
Mario Minniti - The Widow of Nain

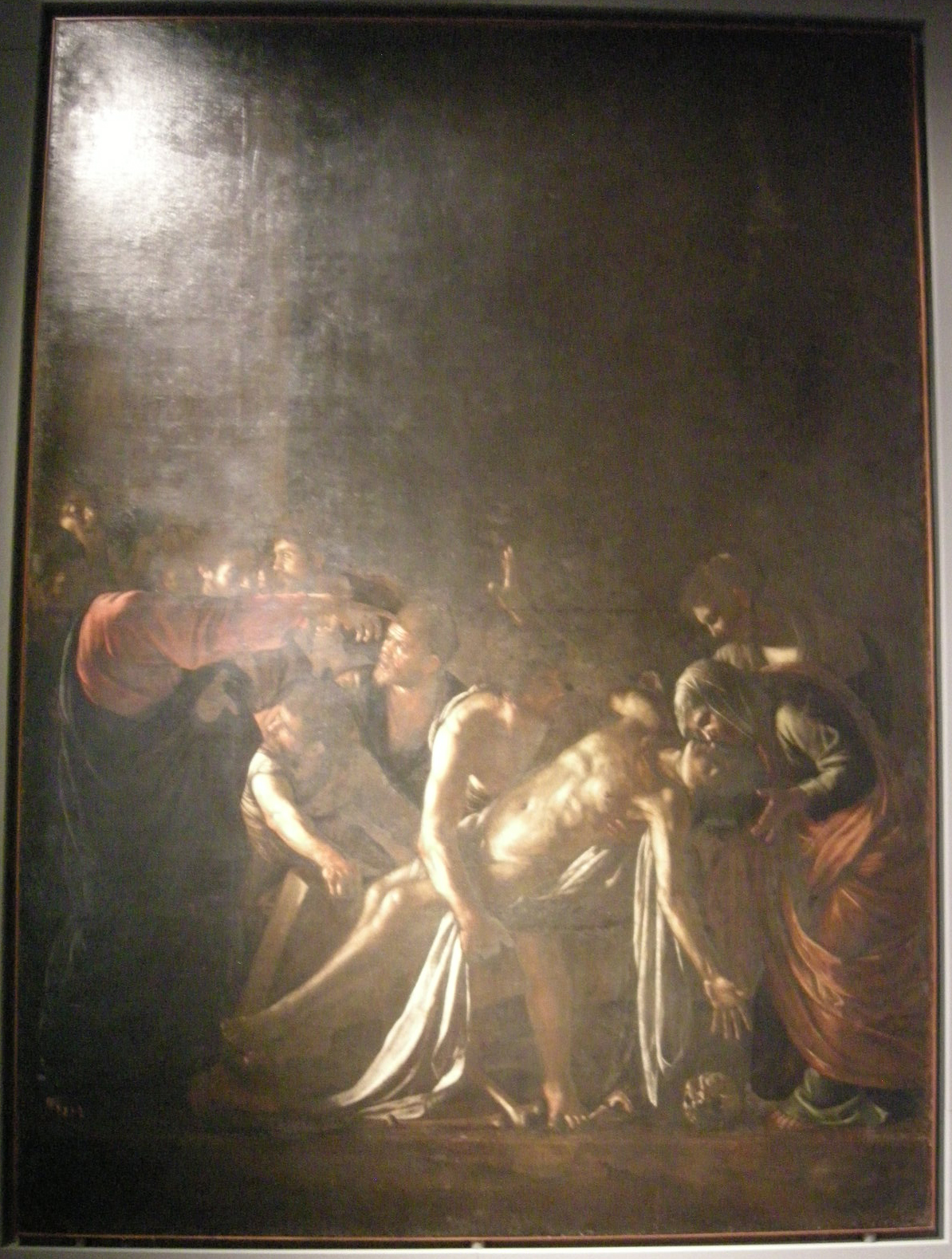
Caravaggio, Raising of Lazarus

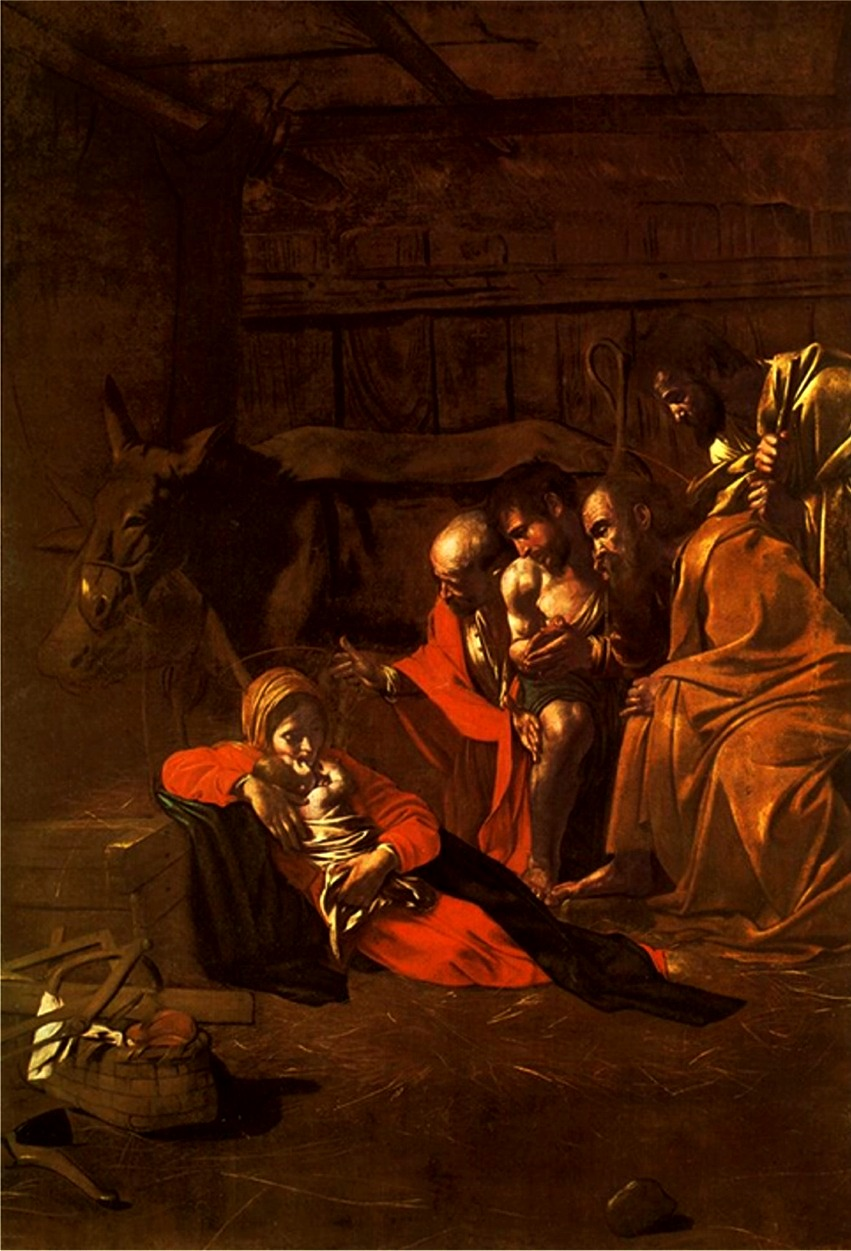
Caravaggio, Adoration of the Shepherds

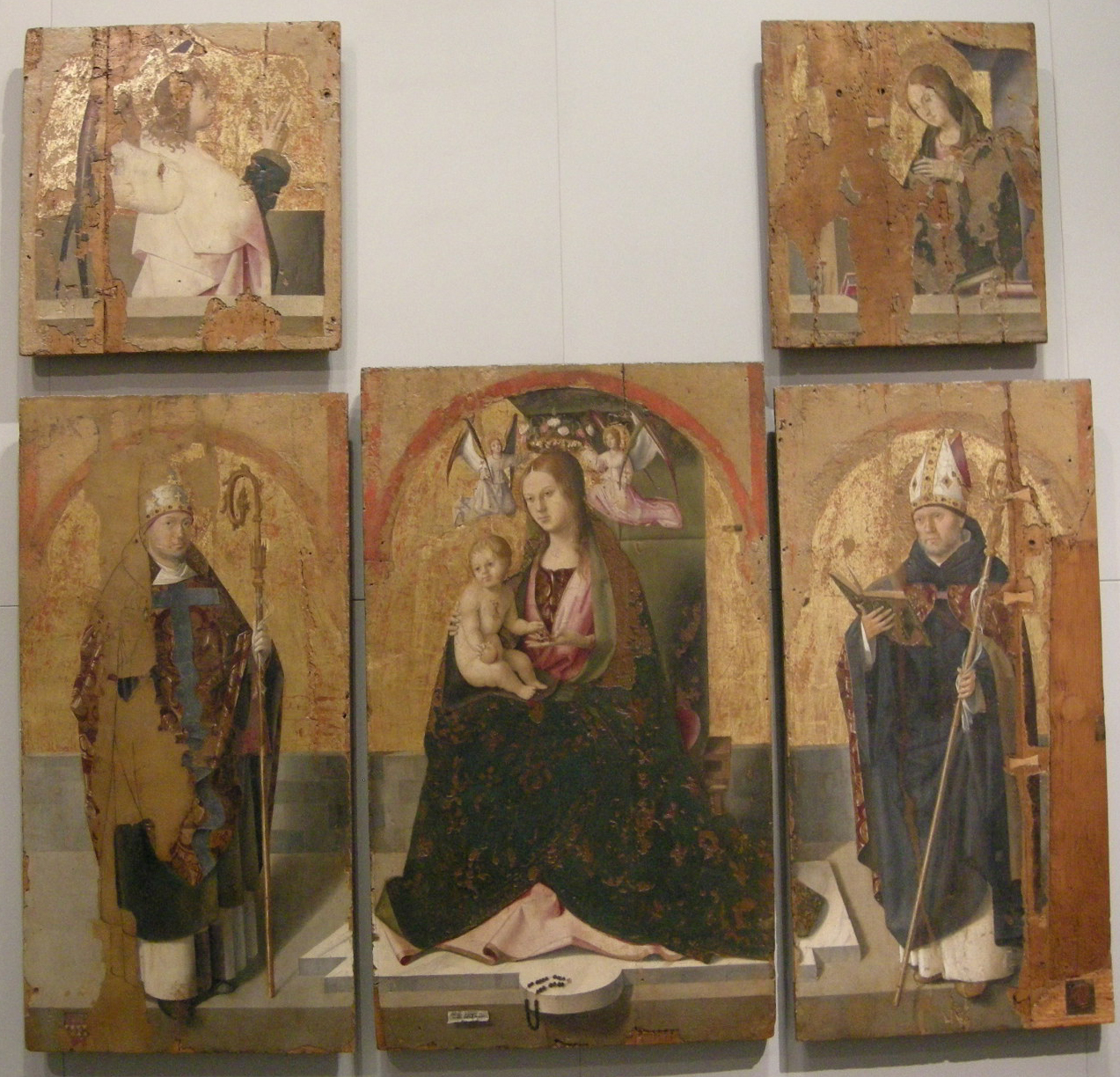
Antonello da Messina, San Gregorio Altarpiece

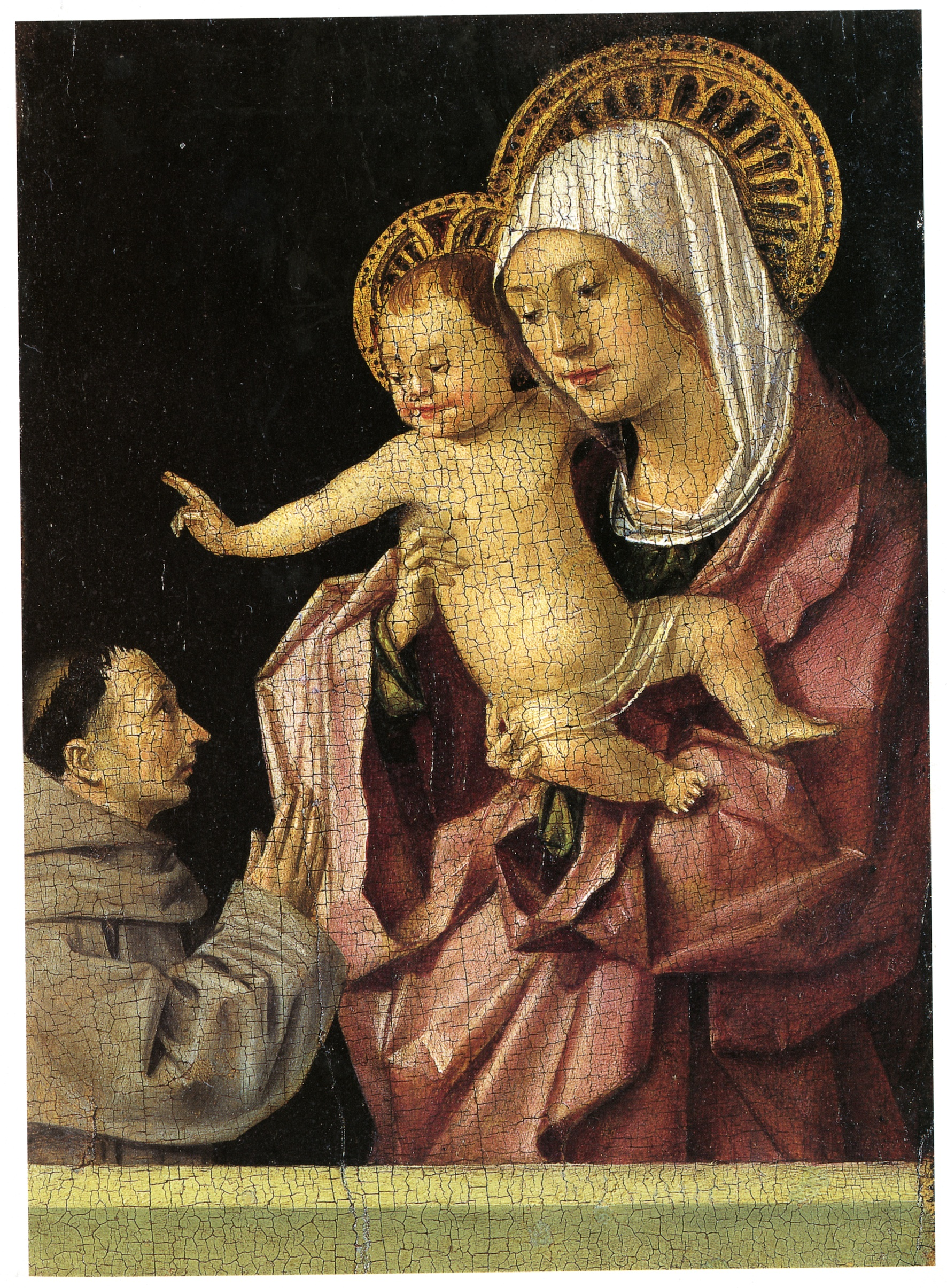
Antonello da messina, Madonna and Child with a Franciscan

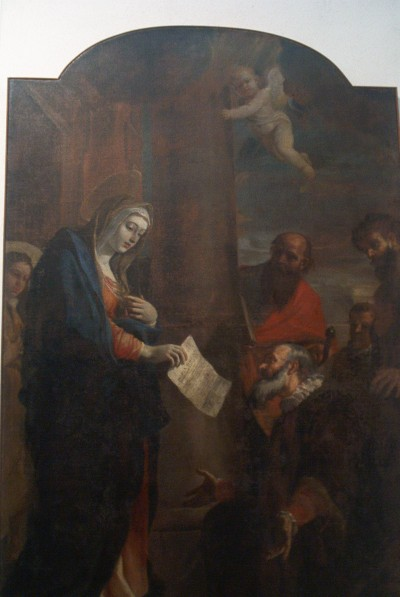
Mattia Preti, Madonna of the Letter

=== Sculptures ===
Antonello Gagini

- Aedicula
- Madonna and Child
- Madonna of the Angels

Giovanni Angelo Montorsoli

- Holy Trinity
- Fontana del Nettuno (original)

Francesco Laurana

- Madonna and Child

Goro di Gregorio

- Madonna degli Storpi (Madonna of the Cripples)

Rinaldo Bonanno

- Marchesi-Barresi funerary monument

Antonello Freri

- Balsamo monument

Martino Montanini

Victory or Peace and Bravery

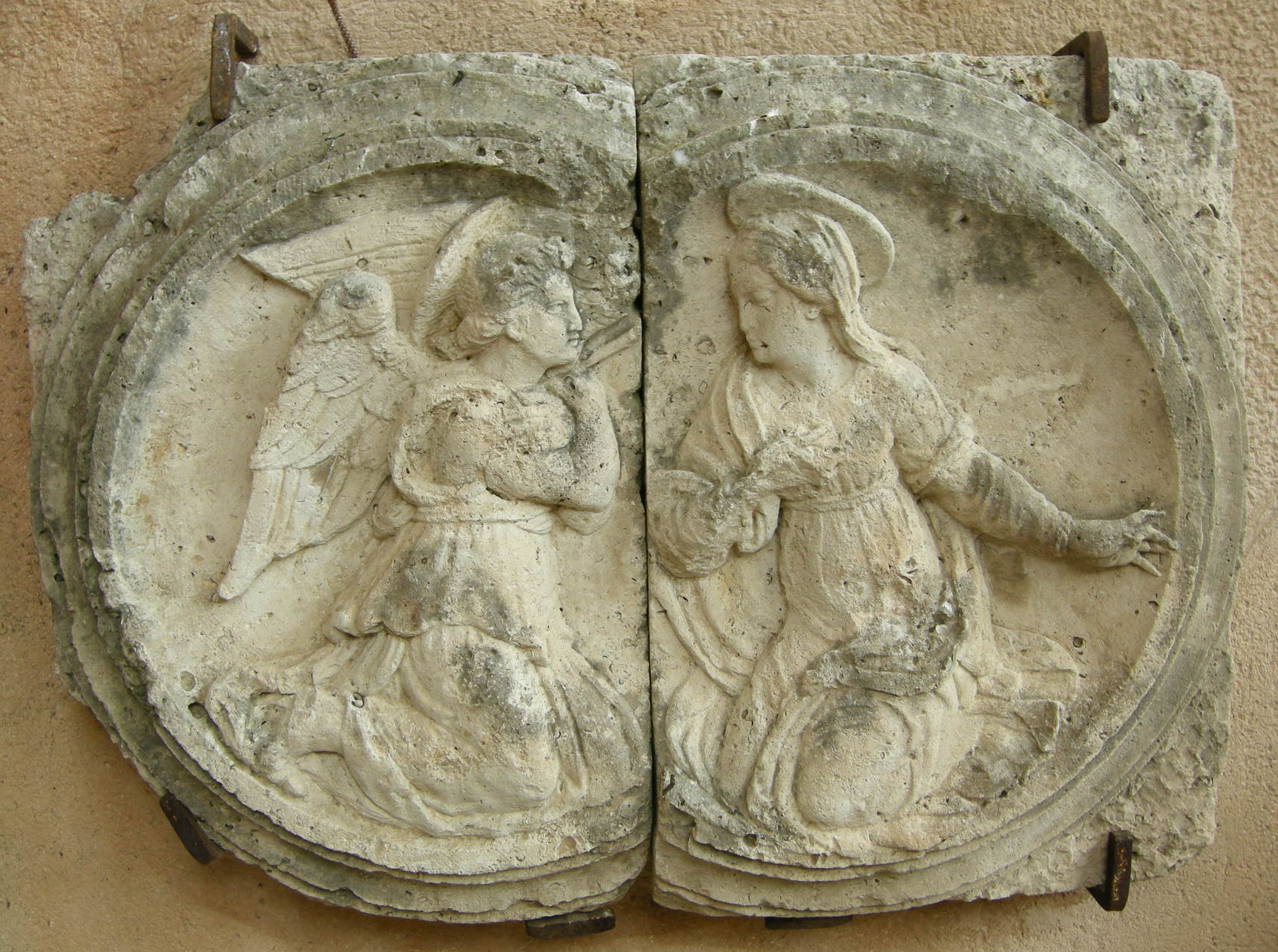
Annunciation

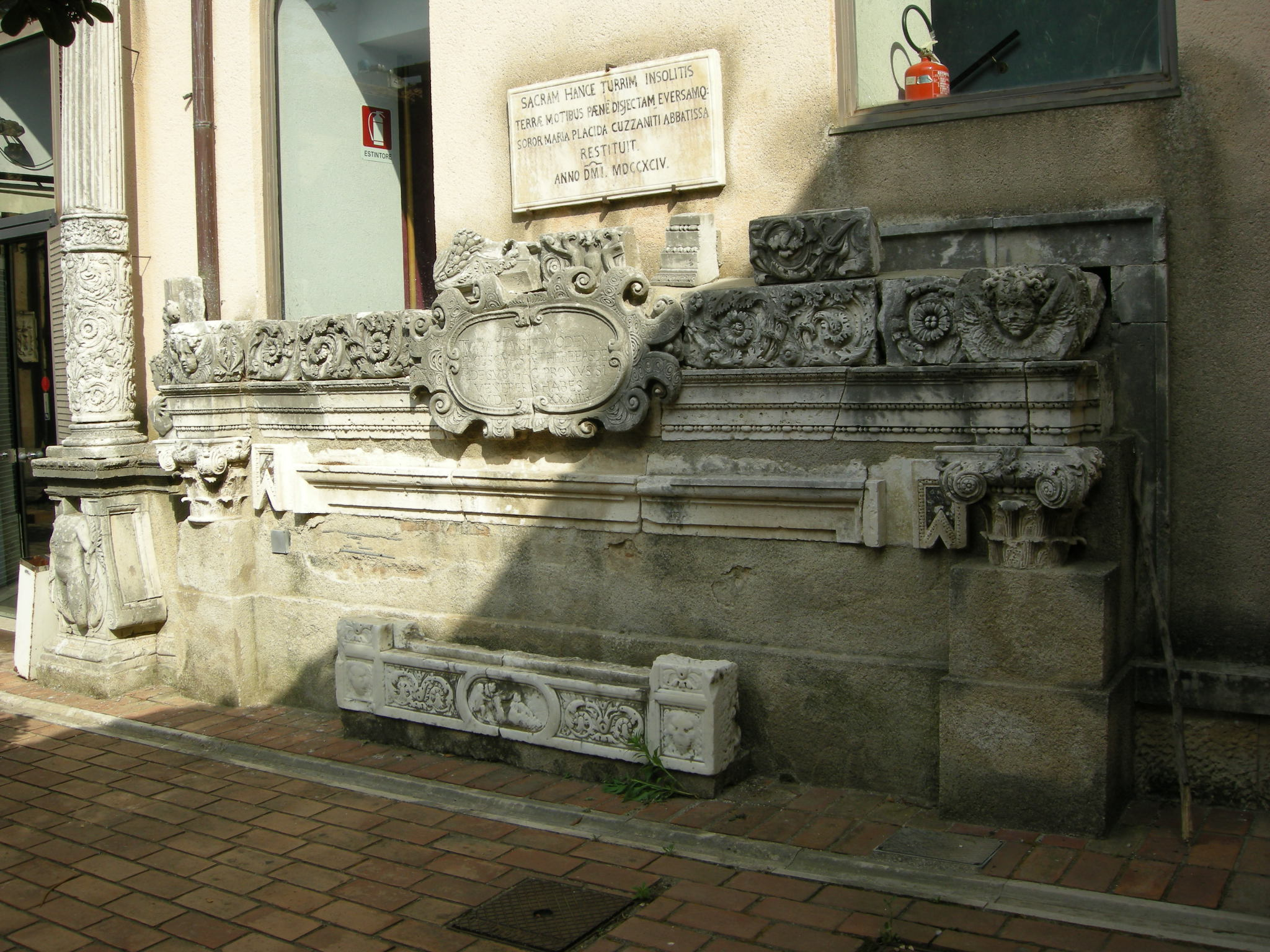

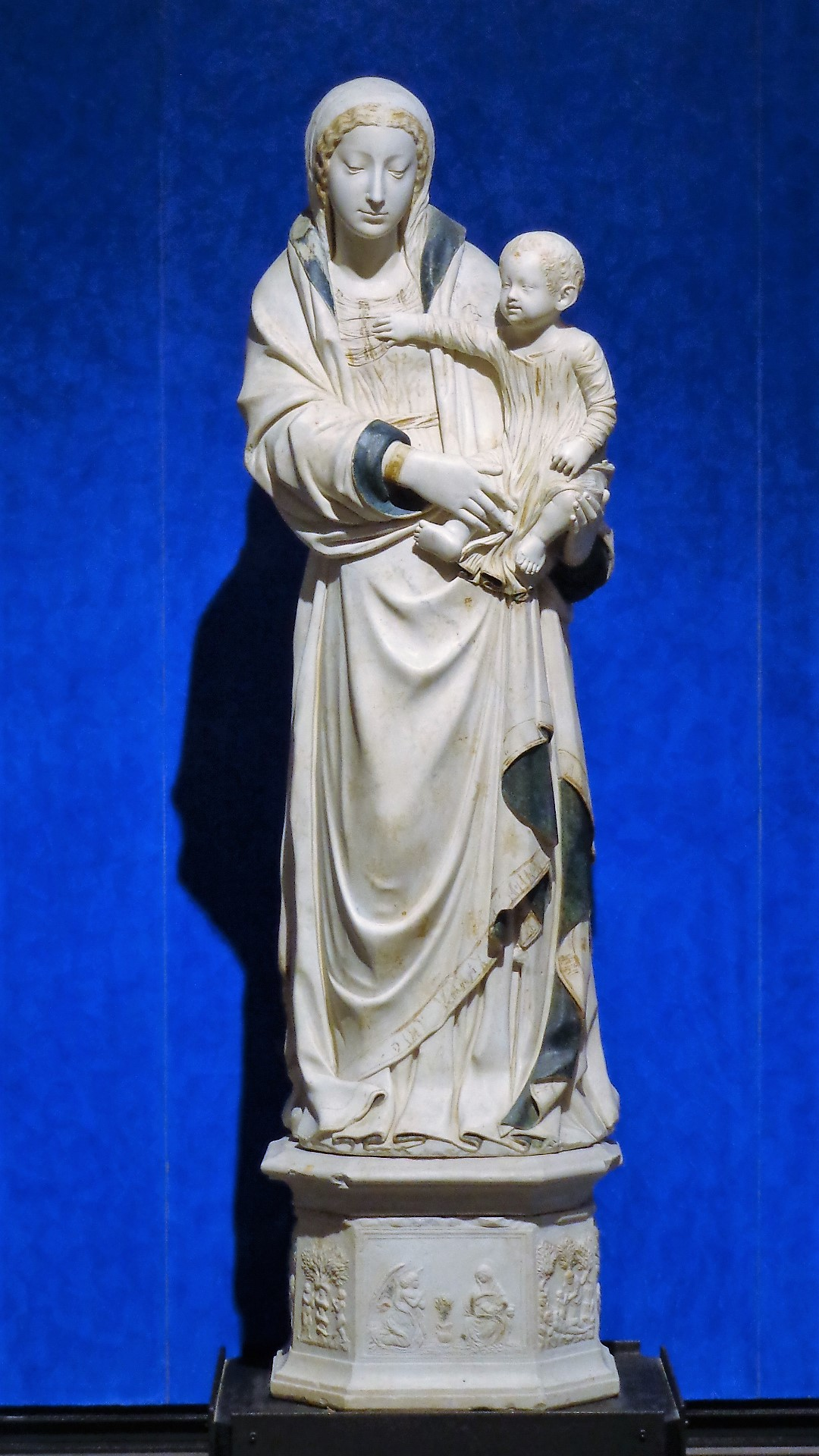
Madonna and Child, Francesco Laurana

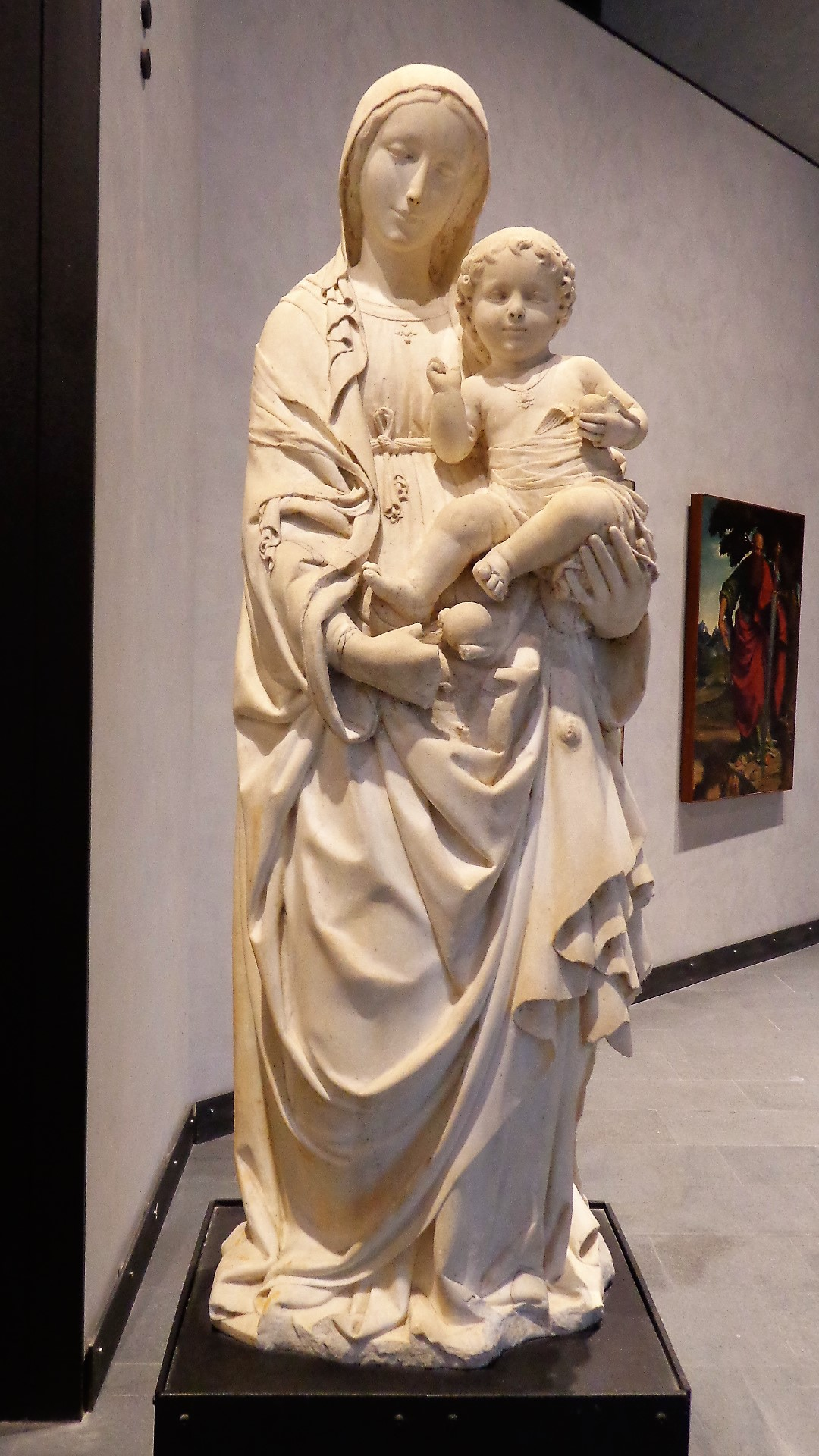
Madonna and Child, Antonello Gagini

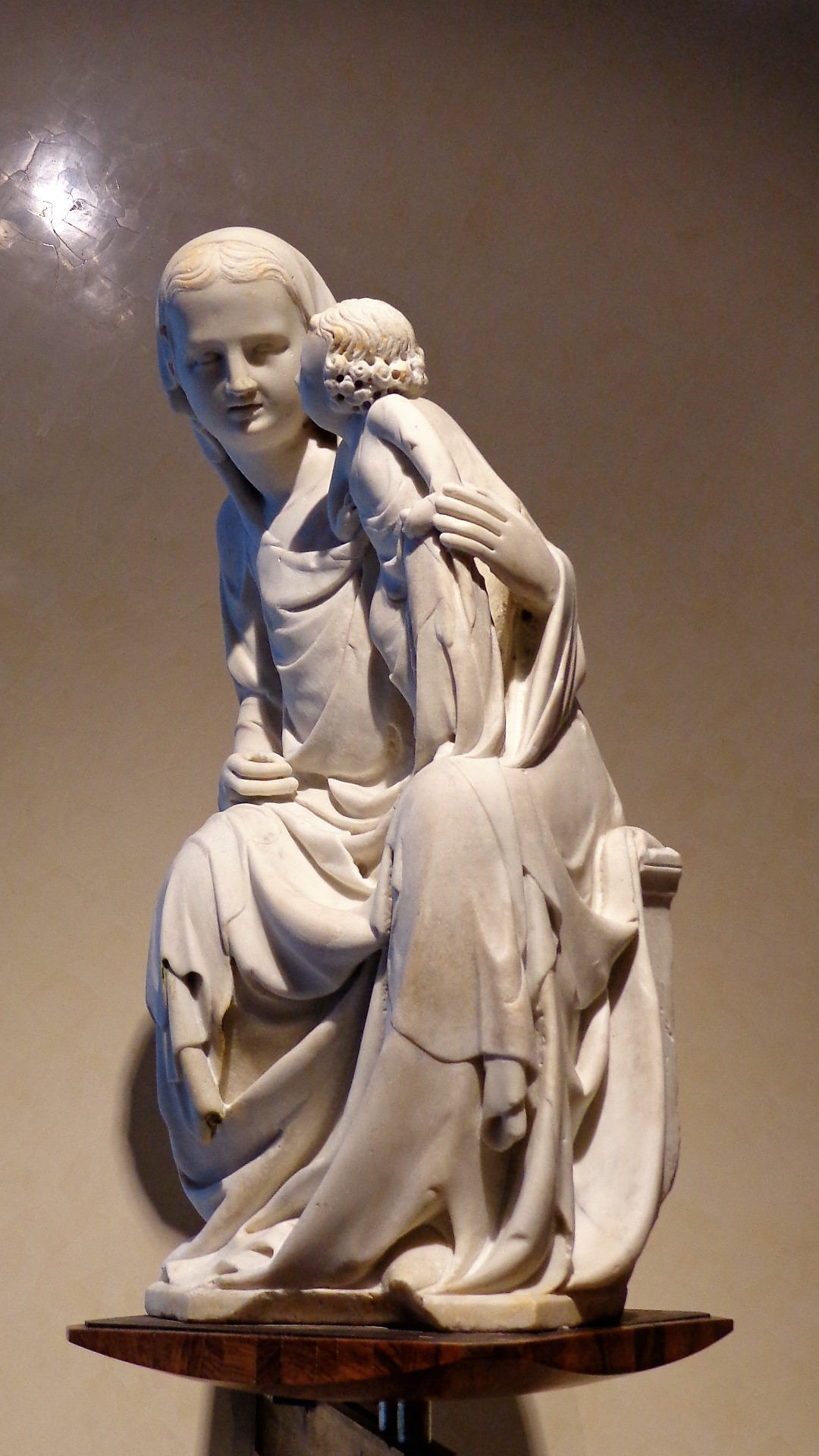
Madonna degli storpi, Goro di Gregorio

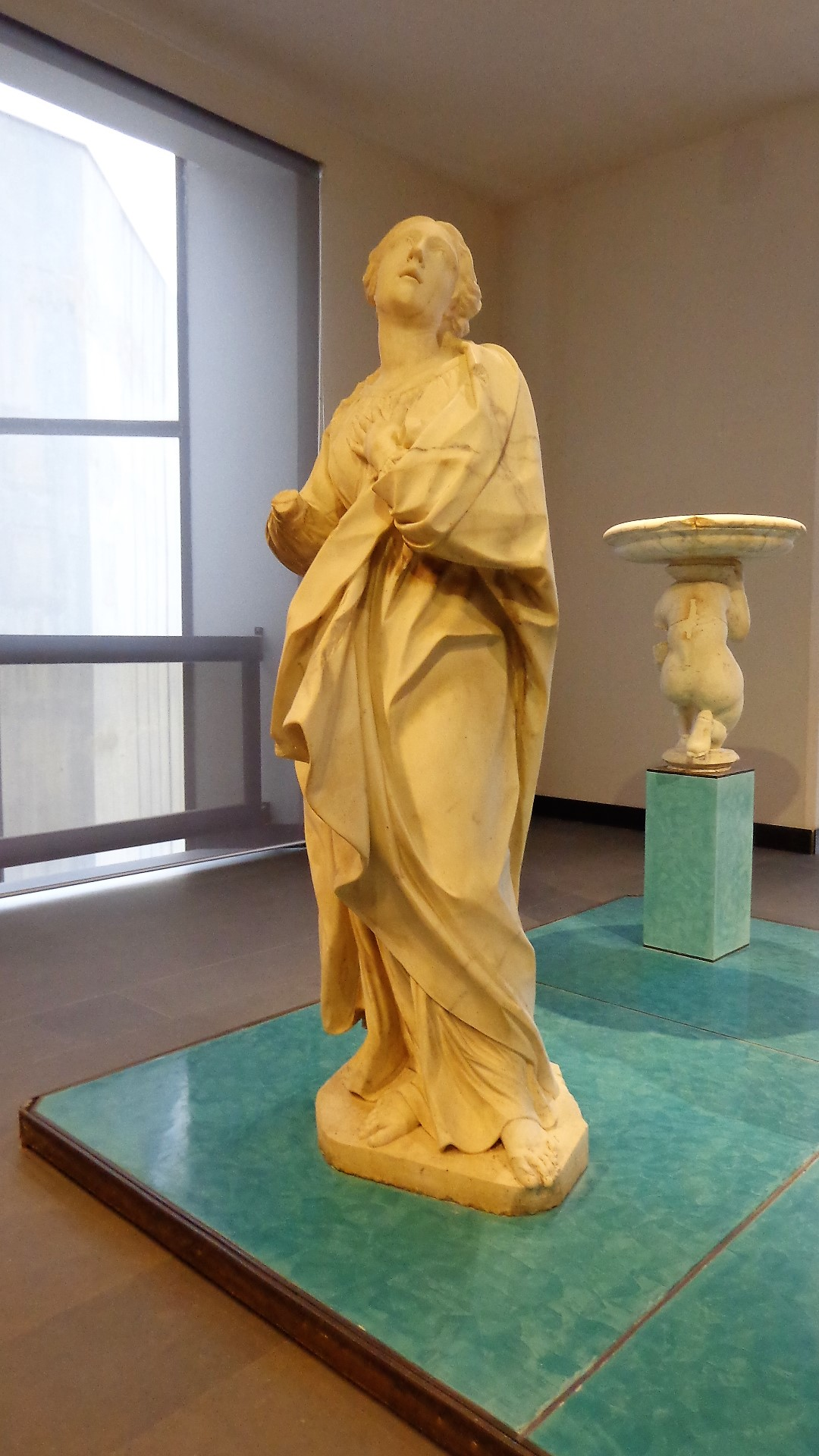
Faith

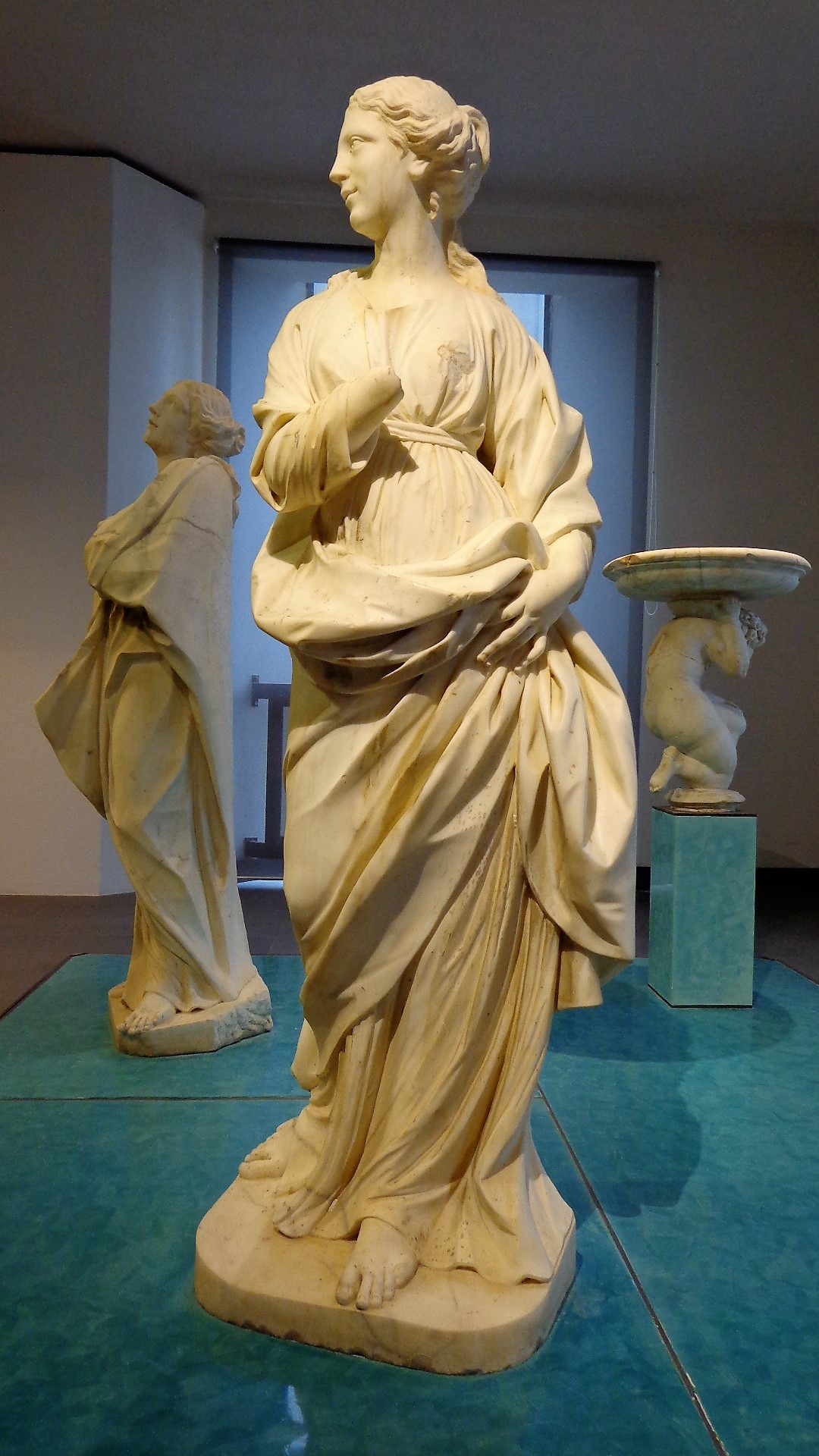
Hope

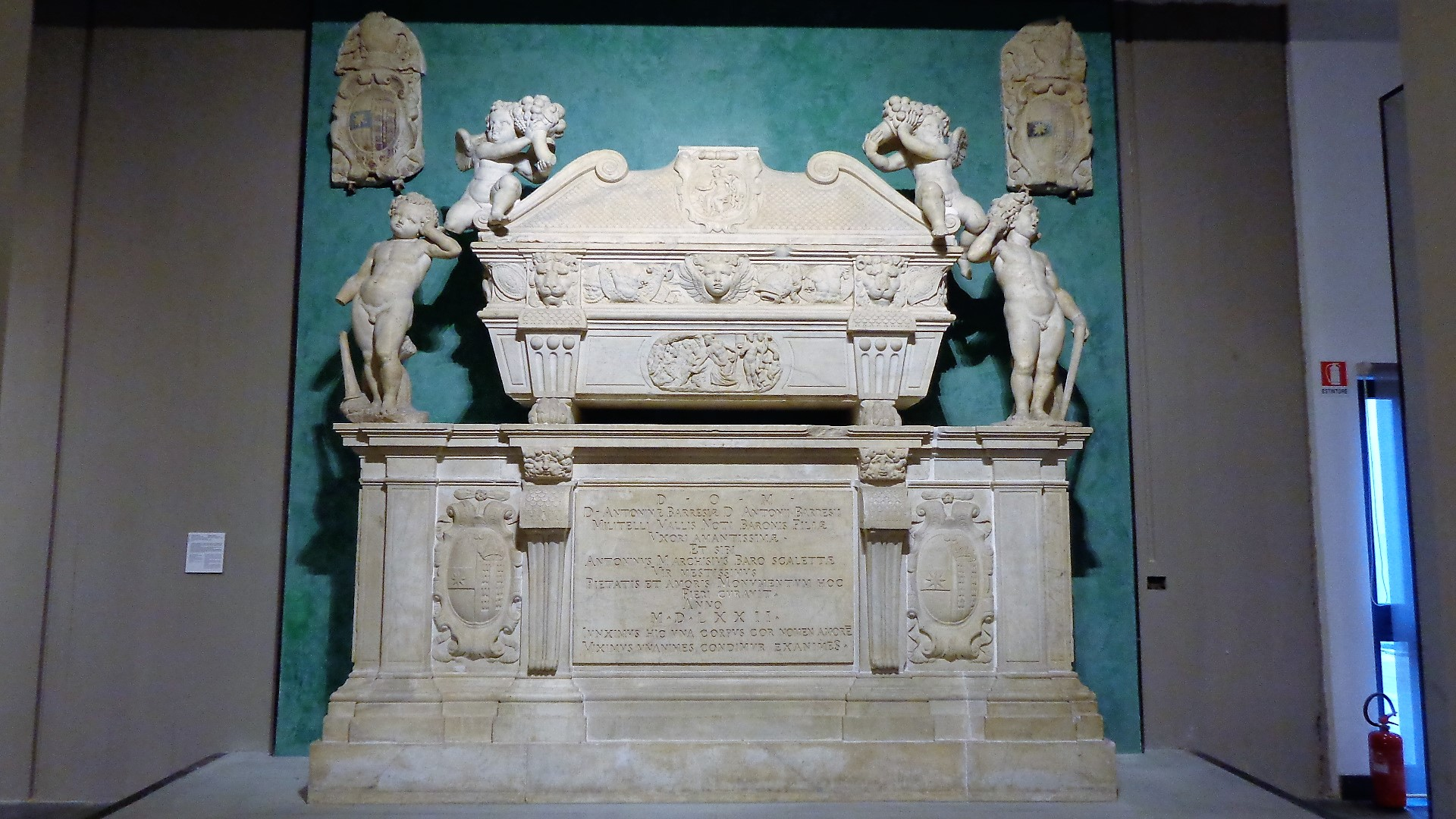
Marchesi-Barresi funerary monument, Rinaldo Bonanno

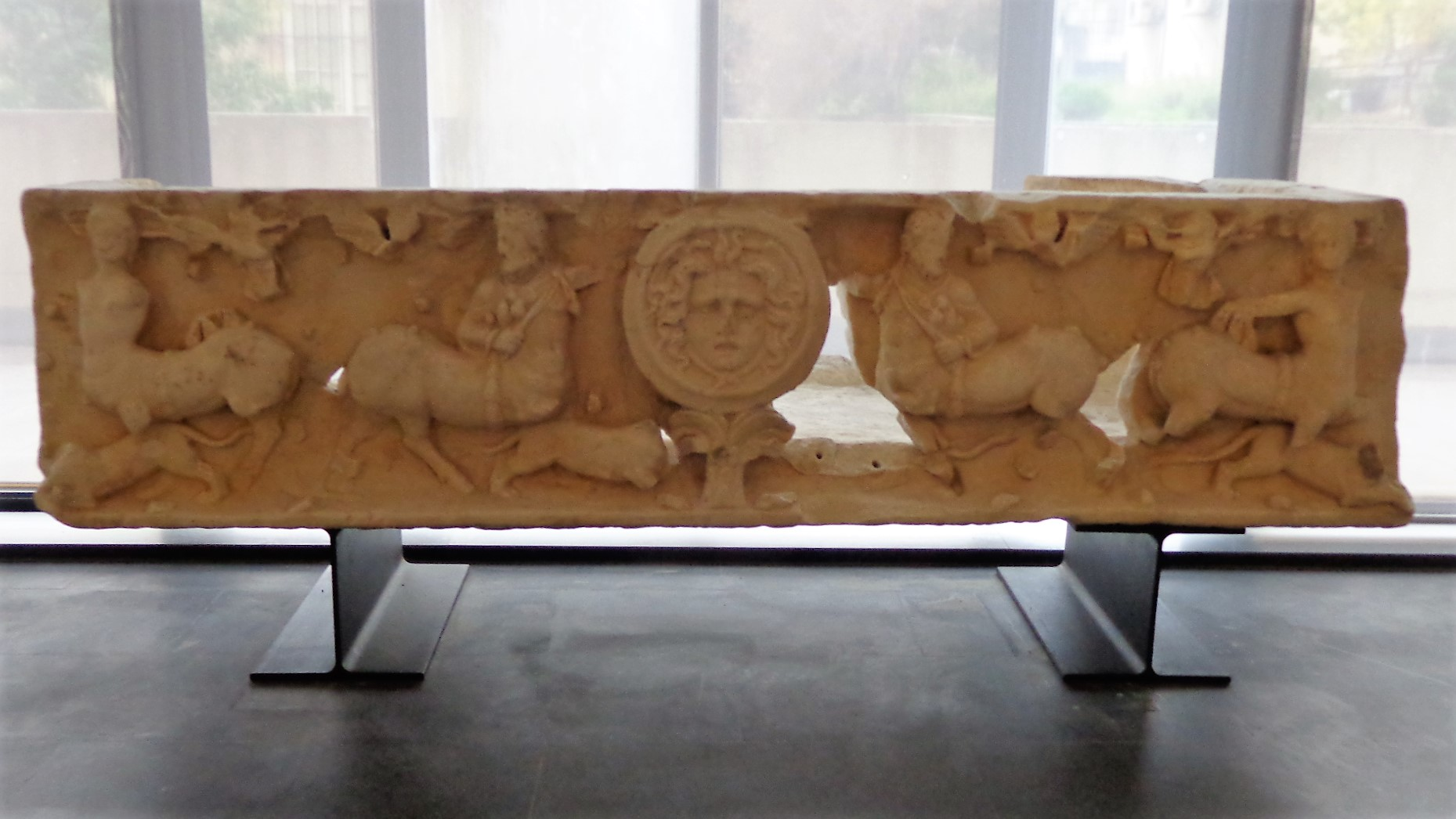

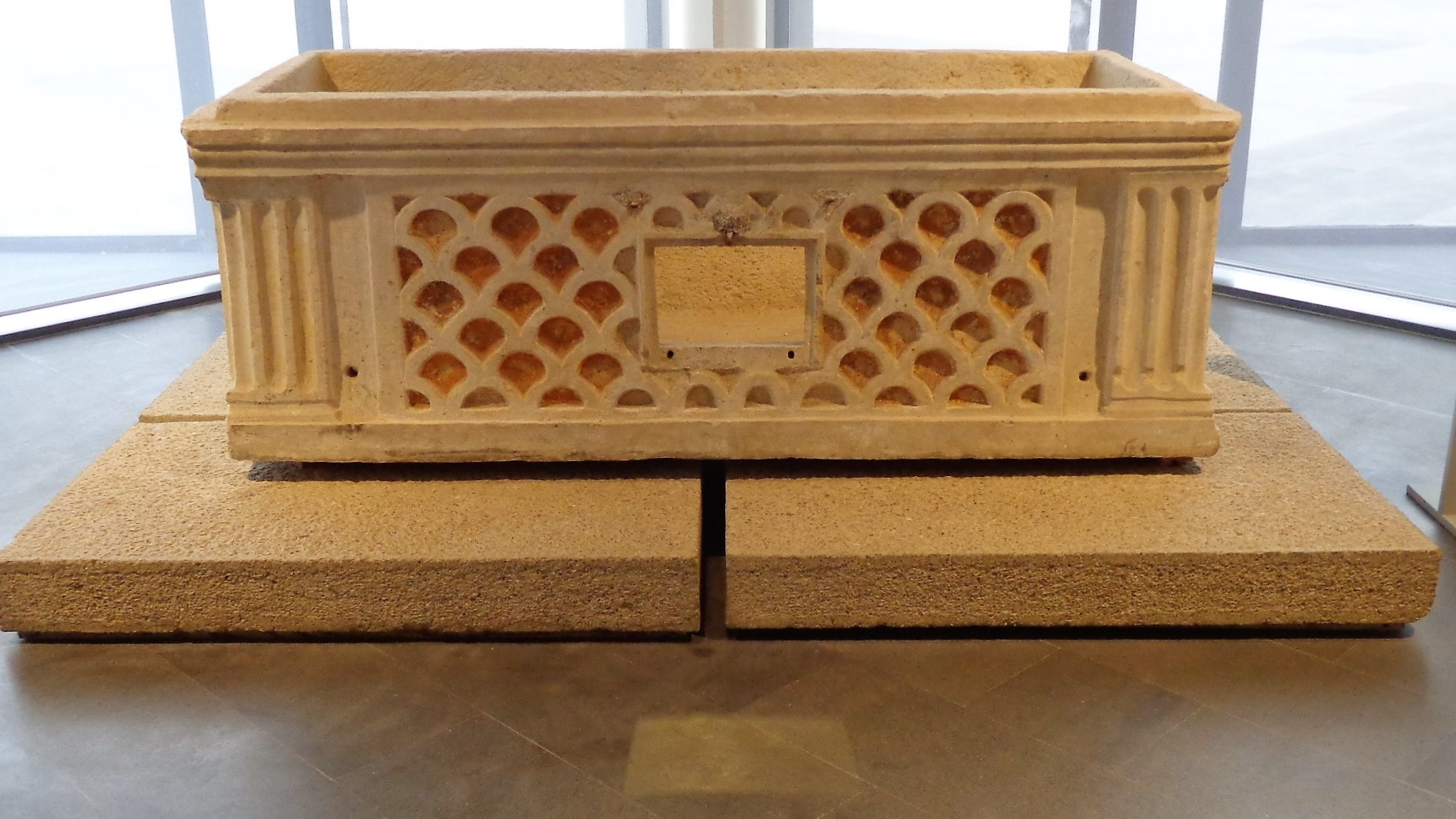
Sarcophagus of Luca I Archimandrita, 1175

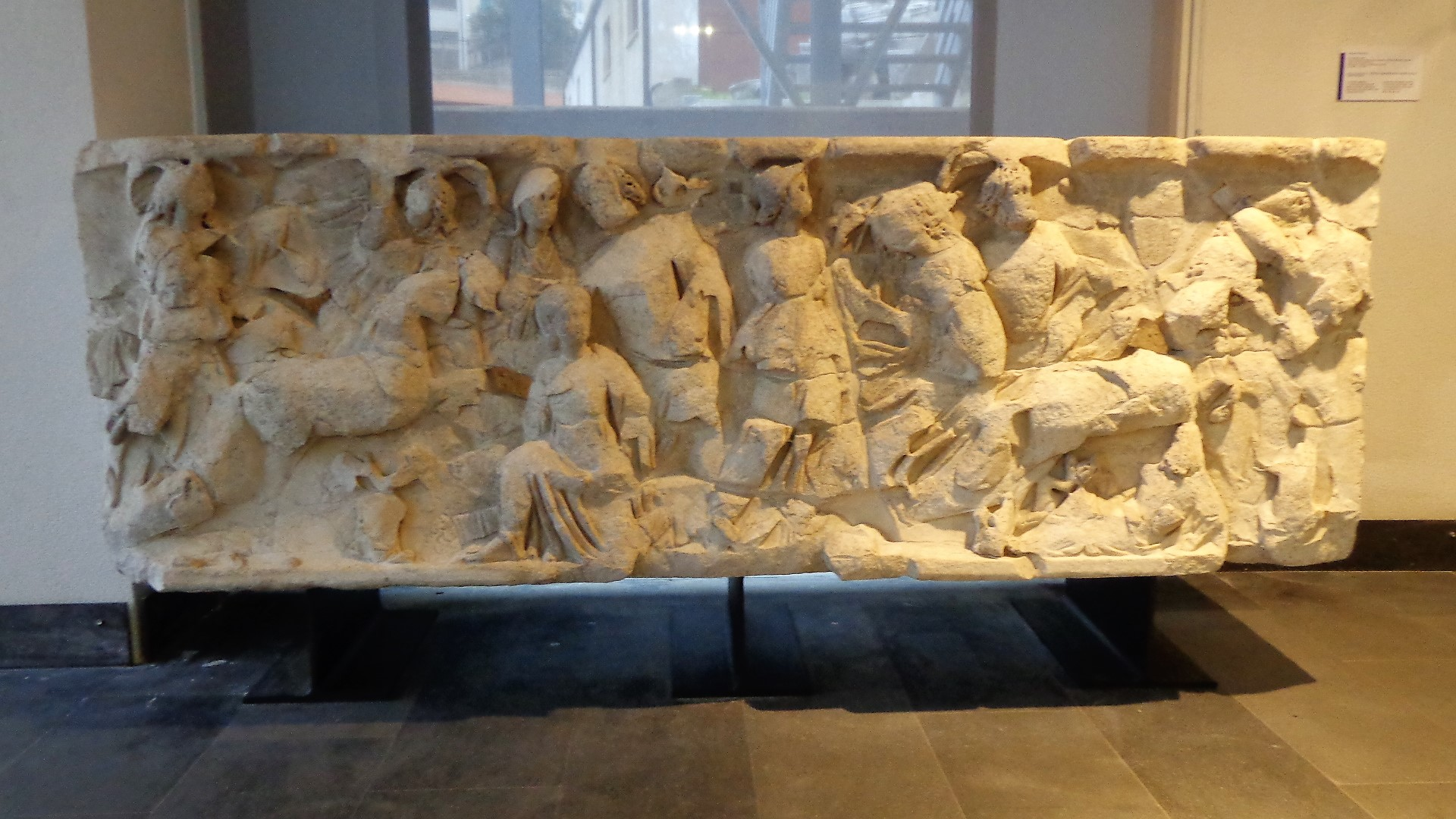

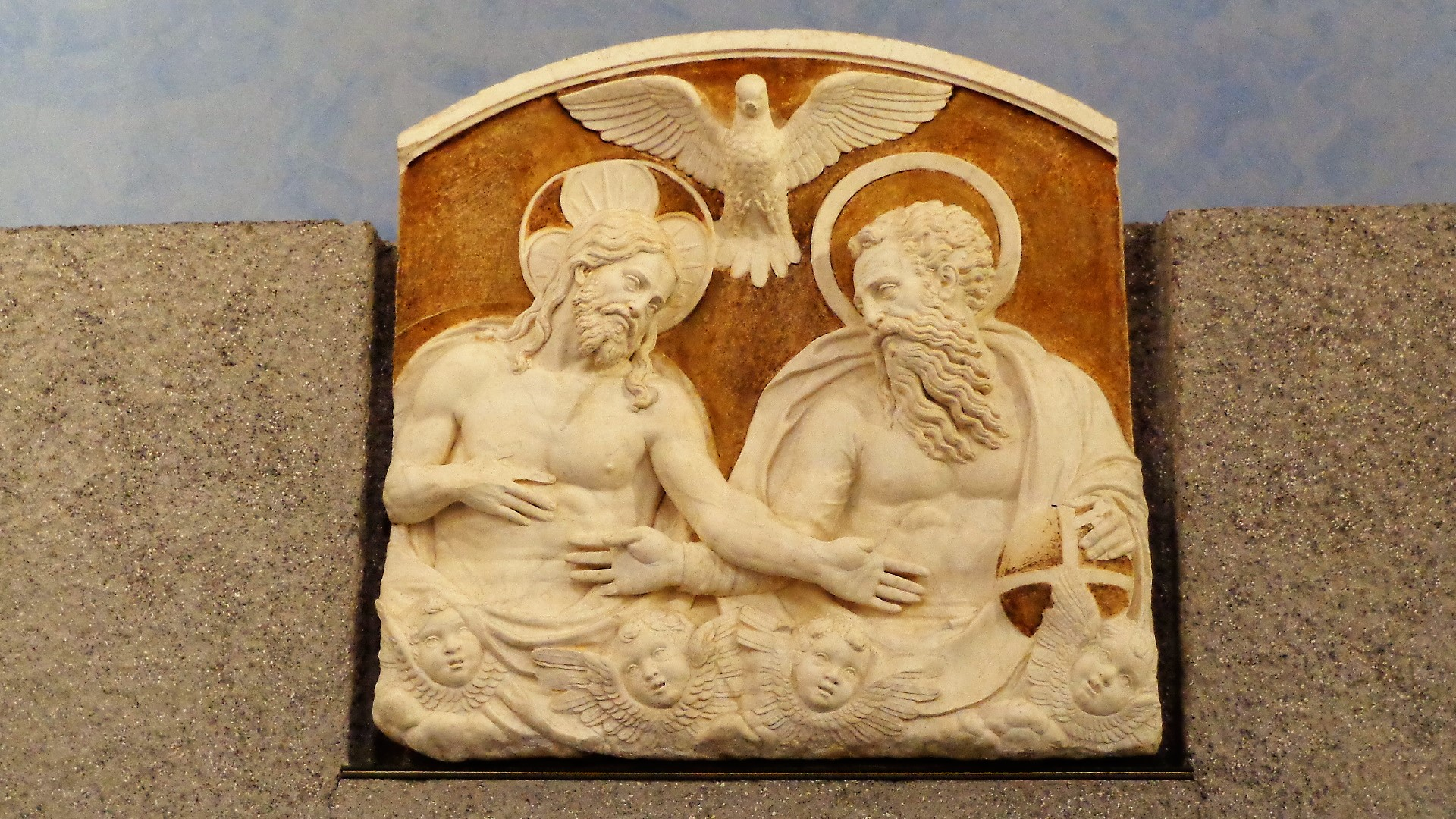
Holy Trinity, Montorsoli

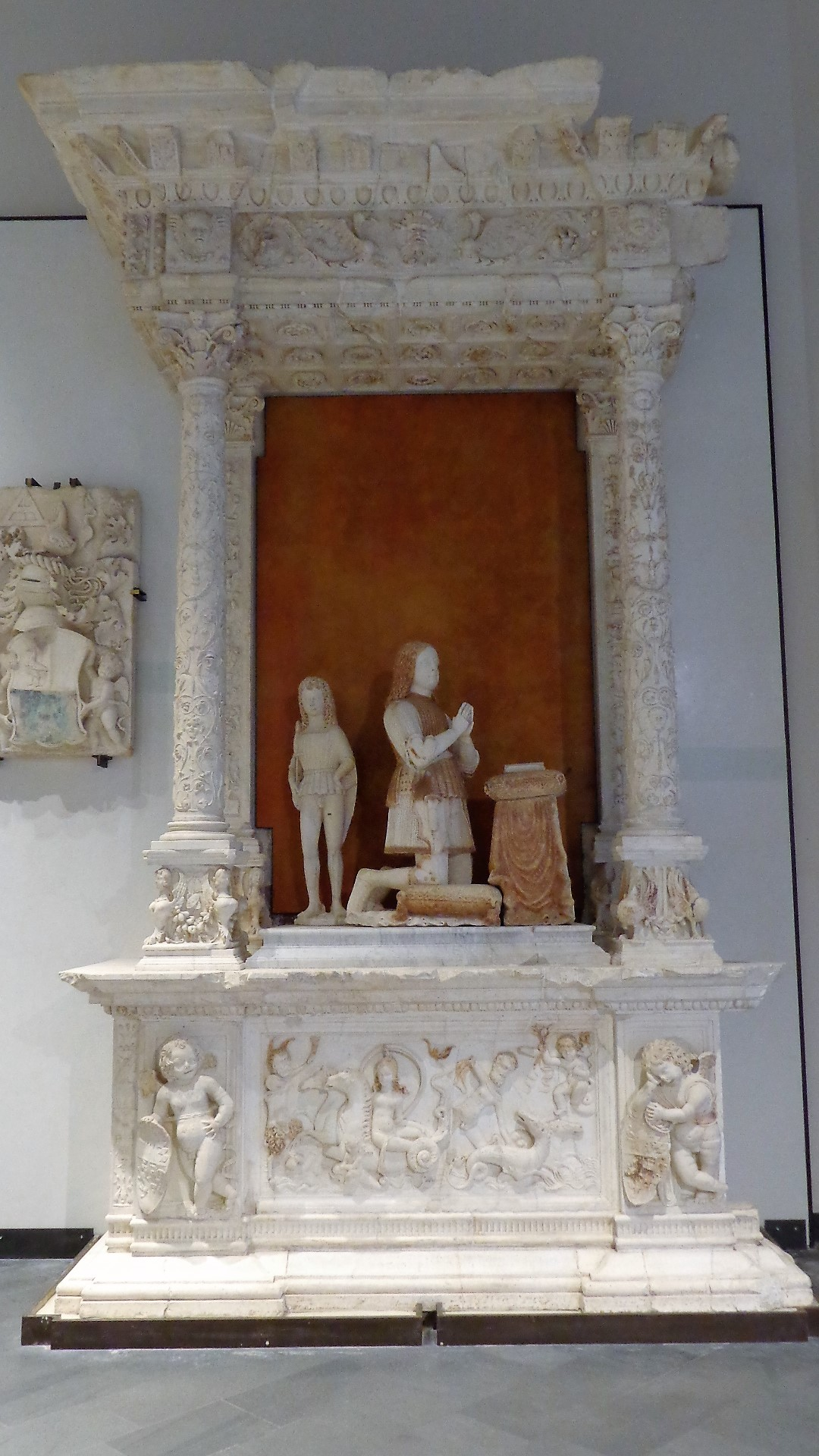
Balsamo monument

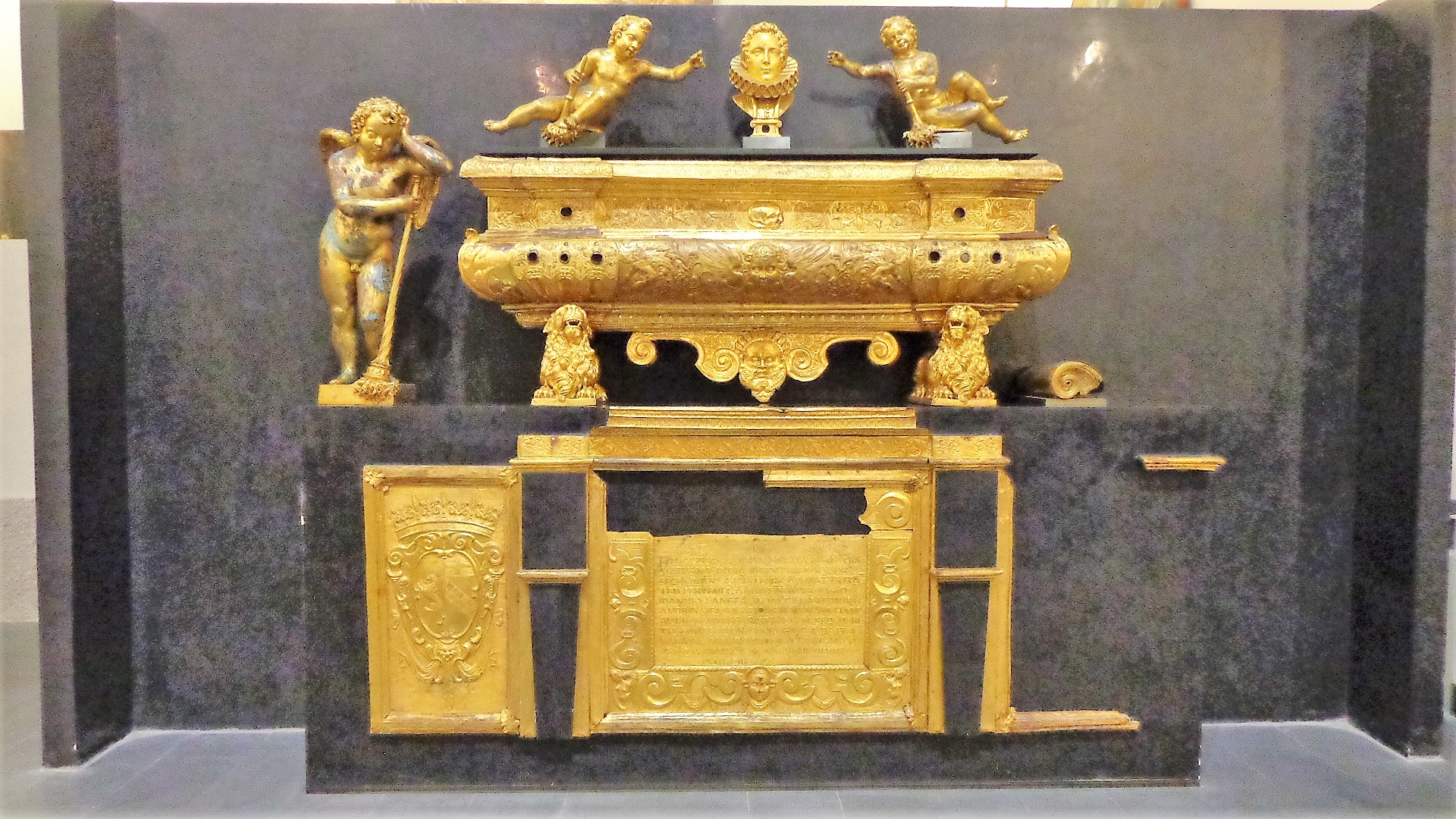
Francesca Lanza Cybo funerary monument

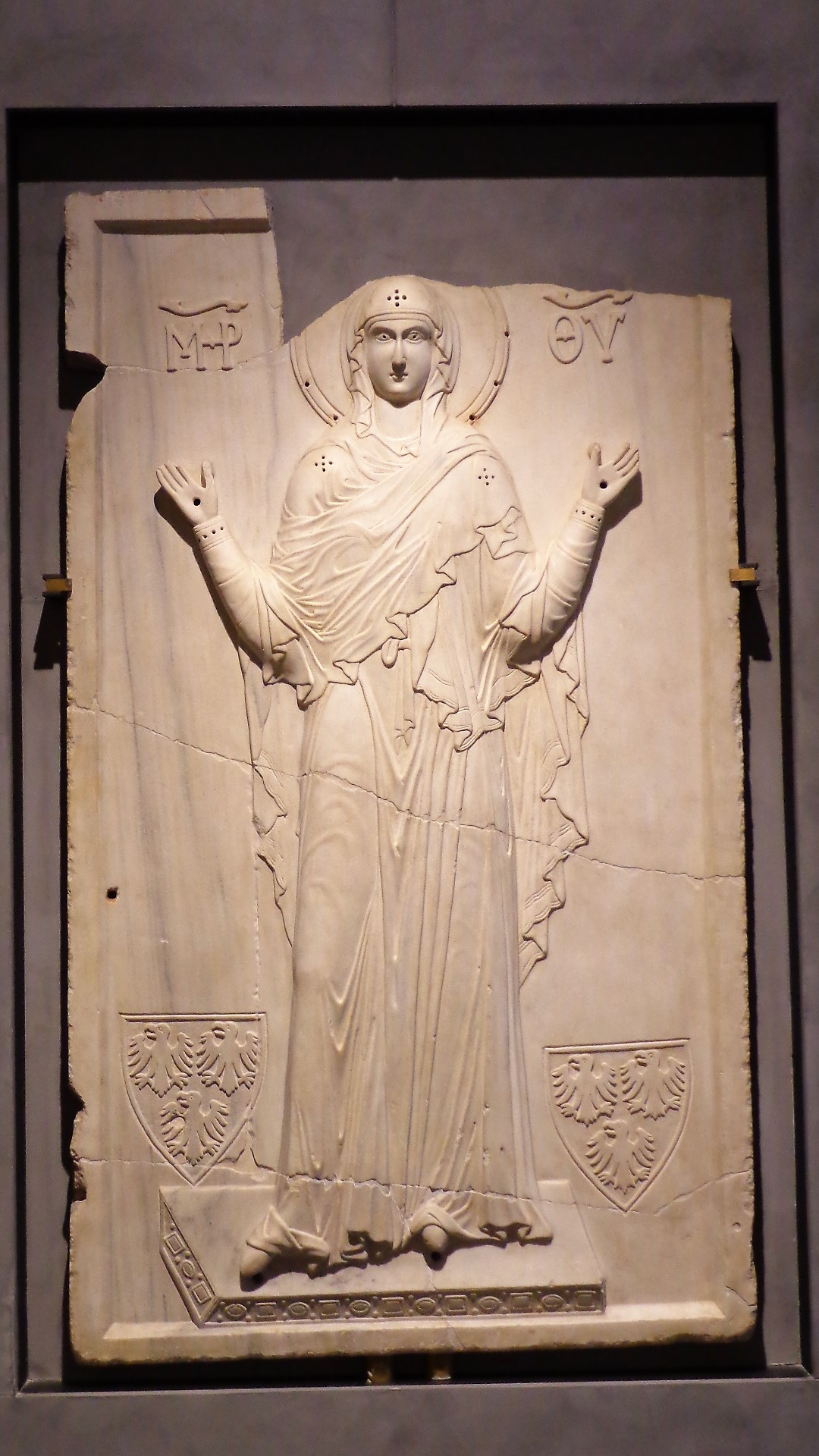
Praying Virgin

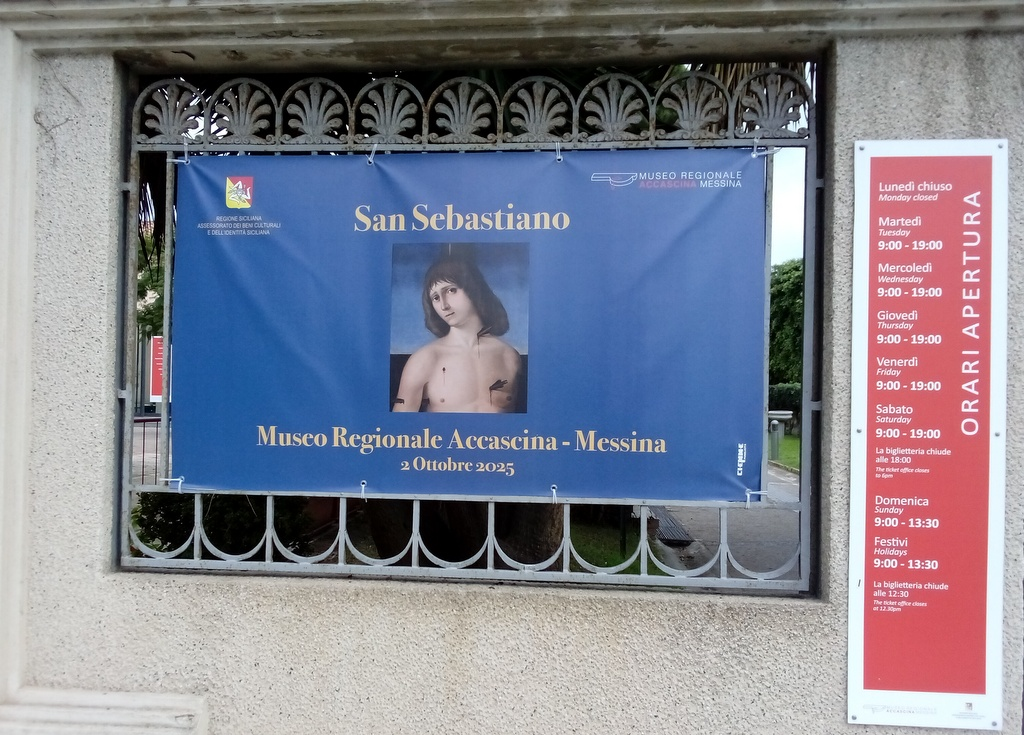
Museum entrance window temporary exhibition

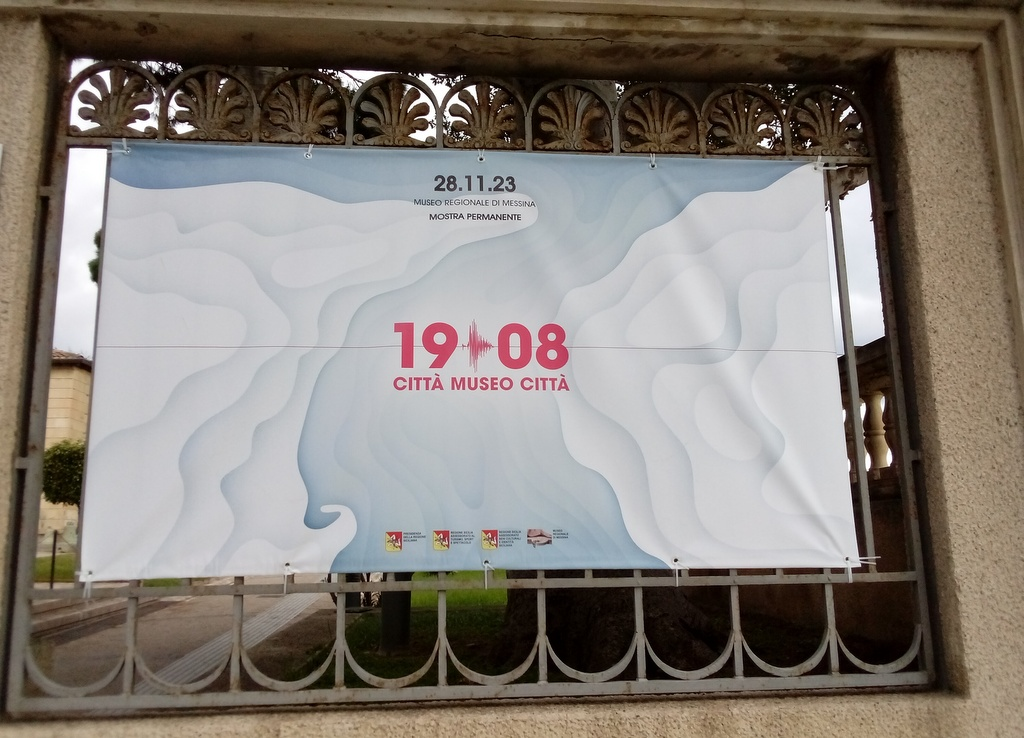
Museum entrance window permanent exhibition

== See also ==
- List of largest art museums
