= Adoration of the Shepherds (Caravaggio) =

Painting by Caravaggio

- Adorazione dei pastori (Italian)
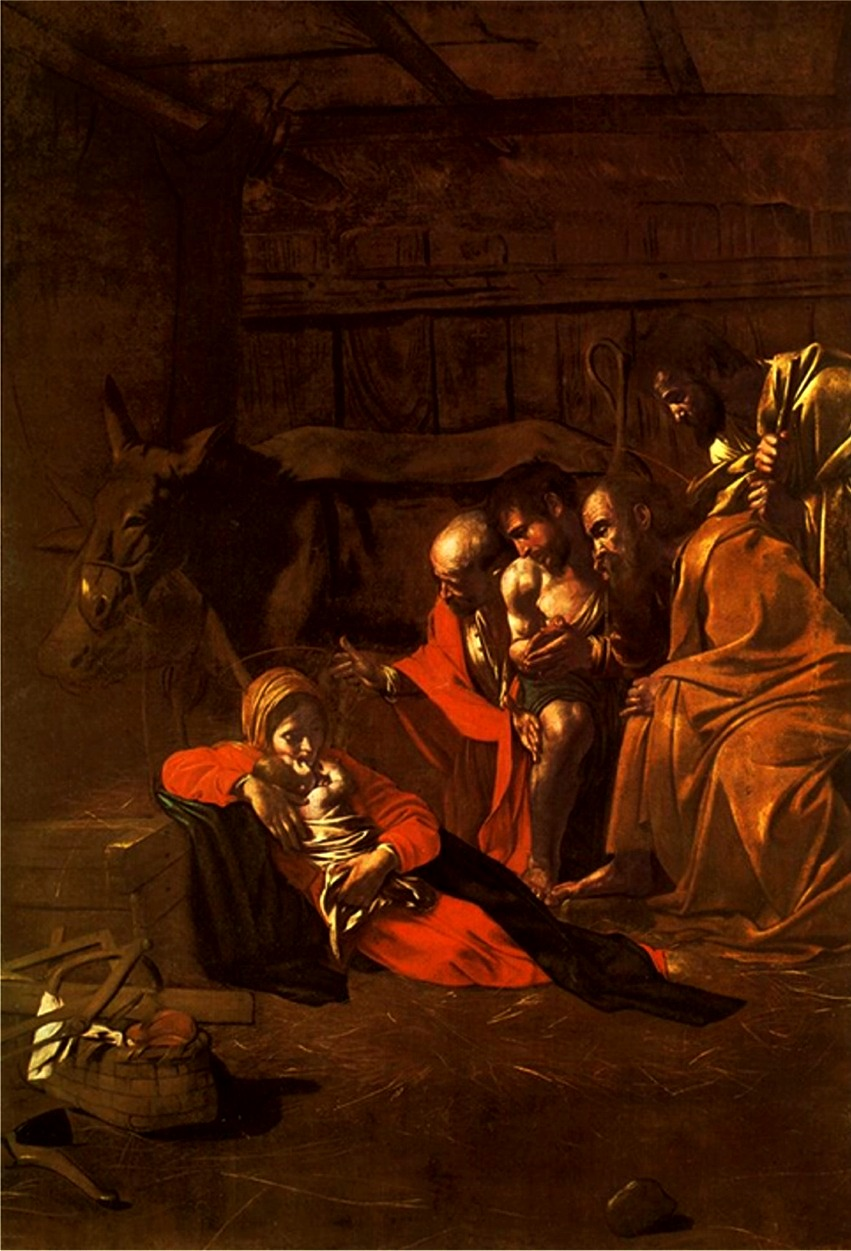
- Artist: Caravaggio
- Year: 1609
- Medium: Oil on canvas
- Dimensions: 314 cm × 211 cm (124 in × 83 in)
- Location: Regional Museum of Messina; Messina

The Adoration of the Shepherds is an oil on canvas painting by the Italian artist Michelangelo Merisi, commonly known as Caravaggio. The Adoration of the Shepherds measures 83.07 x 123.62 in. It was commissioned for the Capuchin Franciscans and was painted in Messina for the Church of Santa Maria degli Angeli in 1609 just one year before the artist's death. It is now in the Regional Museum of Messina.

== History ==
Michelangelo Merisi, commonly known as Caravaggio, was born in Milan in the northern region of Lombardy, Italy in 1571. He had to flee from his hometown after wounding a police officer in a tavern brawl. As with most other aspiring artists, he went to Rome to study classical techniques. Throughout his young adult life, Caravaggio was known amongst Italian citizens to be quite unruly and rebellious. He was often arrested on charges for violent behavior.

Cardinal Francesco Maria del Monte took a struggling Caravaggio into his home and introduced him to his circle—thereby securing Caravaggio with his first public commissions. These commissions were not religious, but entirely secular paintings ranging from flowers and fruit to paintings of a young classical Greek god. It was during this time that he would become world-renowned for the physical particularity and brutal realism of his paintings. In 1599, Caravaggio reached a turning point in his artistic career.

Presumably under Cardinal Francesco del Monte, Caravaggio was commissioned to decorate a wall dedicated to Saint Matthew in the Contarelli Chapel in the church of San Luigi dei Francesi. This was Caravaggio's first religious work for the Catholic Church. He began to be seen as an artistic visionary for the Church with his use of anachronistic technique to draw people back to the Catholic Church during the Counter-Reformation. With this good publicity, he began to pick up many more prestigious commissions. Caravaggio painted from life rather than drawings, which initially received criticism but later revolutionized the term “artistic realism”.

Caravaggio mysteriously died in 1610, a year after finishing The Adoration of the Shepherds.

== Creation and artistic analysis ==
By the time that Caravaggio painted The Adoration of the Shepherds in 1609, the subjects in his paintings had acquired a more spiritual expressiveness. His figures were isolated against vast, empty backgrounds. This was a contrast to the Renaissance technique of employing decorative backgrounds.

The Capuchins were among the few religious patrons and critics who were fond of Caravaggio's brutal realism. Many were critical of Caravaggio's approach to his religious paintings and called it “vulgar” to represent biblical figures as ordinary peasants. The focal point of the scene is Mary in the center. She is swathed in bright red. One of the three shepherds closest to her also has a little bit of what appears to be the same red robe draped along his arm. This might be symbolic of the gesture he is making to touch the Virgin as she is holding Christ. All three shepherds, as well as Joseph identified by a faint halo, look on with amazement and complete adoration at this infant child born in a barn.

Caravaggio's Baroque work is different from his Renaissance predecessors. Not only the shepherds, but his sacred figures are represented as ordinary people of the times. They are barefoot with ordinary clothes. There is no holy light source to highlight that a divine event is occurring. Instead, the background is extremely dark with only a small single light source. It seems as though the space was lit by a single candle, as it might have realistically been during the actual event. We know that in the biblical account, Mary and Joseph were extremely poor. Their halos are almost barely seen, in contrast to the ornate halos of the Renaissance. Other than the halos, the clasped hands of the shepherds are the only thing hinting of any religious importance in the painting. There was nothing overtly marvelous about the birth of Christ.

Caravaggio's compositions are also non-classical: he arranges his figures along imaginary diagonal lines rather than a perfectly center linear composition like the Renaissance. There is a box of tools in the foreground, presumably Joseph's since he was a carpenter. There is a single roughly baked loaf of bread as well to reiterate Mary and Joseph's poverty. There is nothing pre-arranged in the painting. It looks like a photograph that would have been taken in the exact moments after Christ's birth.

Stylistically, Caravaggio used a technique called chiaroscuro, a strong contrast between dark and light. Using this technique heightened the drama of the work to make it seem raw and magnify the emotional aspects of the work. Chiaroscuro forces the viewer to focus on the figures and the event rather than other things going on in the background.

The central theme of the painting is humility. By seating the Virgin on the ground, Caravaggio implies that she is not a heavenly queen, but rather a simple young mother. This painting is a representation of the majority. The response of the shepherds is to admire rather than to venerate. There are a calmness and tranquility that is unmistakably conveying their worth as common folk for the people as the parents of the Savior.

== See also ==
- List of paintings by Caravaggio
