= San Gregorio Polyptych =

Painting by Antonello da Messina

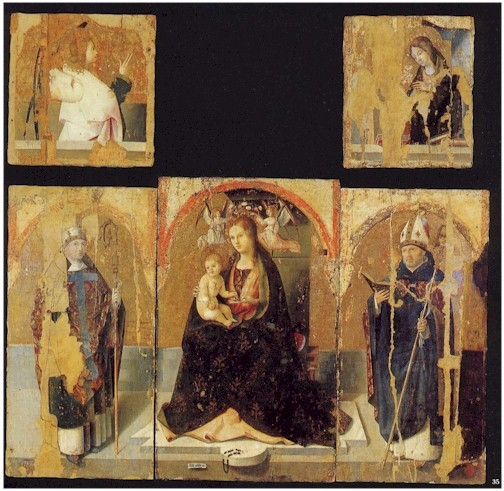
- Artist: Antonello da Messina
- Year: 1473
- Medium: Tempera on wood
- Dimensions: 194 cm × 202 cm (76 in × 80 in)
- Location: Regional Museum, Messina (until 2026)

The San Gregorio Polyptych is a polyptych tempera on wood by the Italian Renaissance master Antonello da Messina, completed in 1473. It was housed in the Regional Museum of Messina, Italy, until it was stolen in August 2026.

== History ==
The polyptych is signed in the cartouche visible on the step in the central panel. It was commissioned for the convent annexed to the church of Santa Maria extra moenia in Messina, also called San Gregorio, whence its modern name. The panels were originally connected by a carved frame in Neo-Gothic style, which was likely removed from as early as the 16th century.

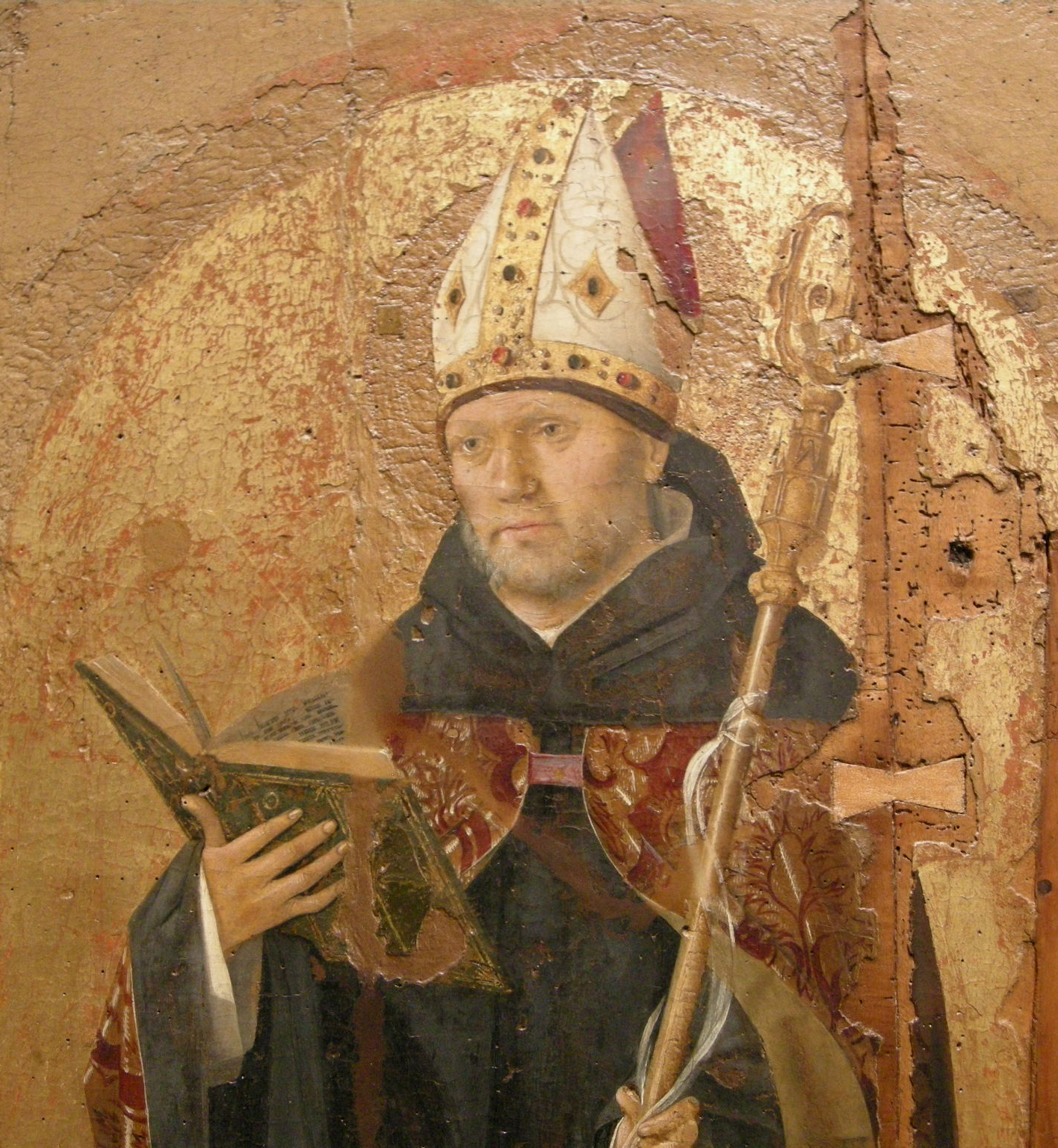
Detail of St. Benedict

The work is in a poor state. One of the panels was removed in the 16th century or later, and in 1842 there was a drastic restoration of what remained. In 1908, the former convent where the work was kept was destroyed by the 1908 Messina earthquake, leaving its art pieces exposed to the rain which fell in the following days. On that occasion, large parts of the Madonna's mantle and of St. Gregory were lost.

Recovery interventions began in 1912, under the direction of Luigi Cavenaghi. This concerned, in particular, the side panels, including a restoration of lost parts based on existing photographs (such as one of St. Gregory's hands). A new restoration was performed during 1940–1942 by the Istituto Centrale del Restauro of Rome, followed by another (Angel of Annunciation panel) in 1981. In 2005–2006 there was a complete check of the polyptych, when it was exhibited at the Quirinal Palace. Some details, which had been covered by later repaintings and restorations, were recovered; they include the original decoration with vegetable motifs of Mary's mantle (originally completed by a gilt decoration, now lost).

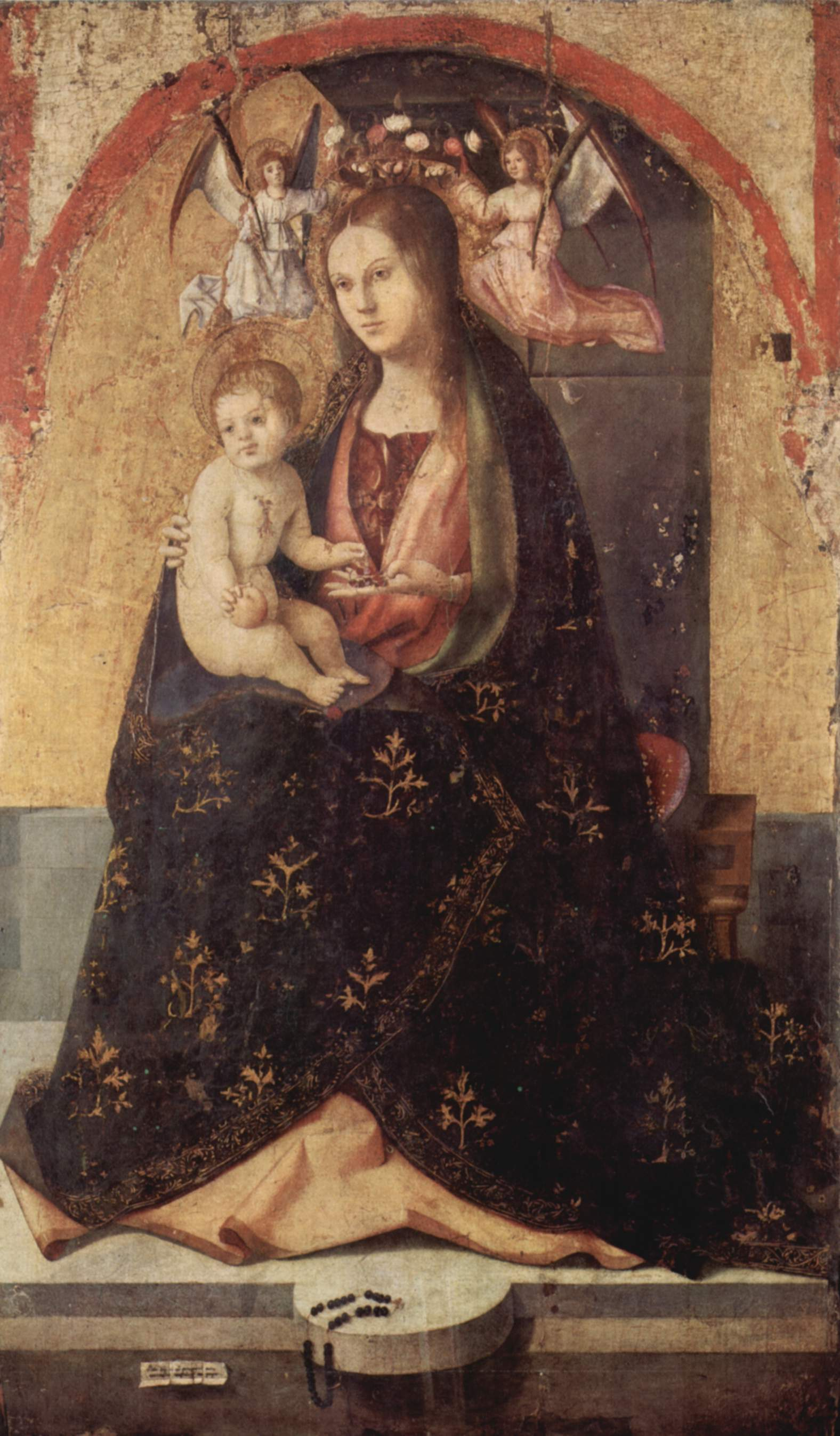
The central panel of the Madonna of the Rosary Enthroned

On 15 August 2026, the polyptych was stolen from the museum alongside another artwork by da Messina. According to the museum's director Marisa Mercurio, the theft was thought to have occurred around 21:50 local time. Mercurio described it as "a great loss for the museum, for the city, the community and the art world".

== Description ==
Five of the original panels in the polyptych, on two levels, survive. The lower level shows, at the center, the Madonna of the Rosary Enthroned, flanked by St. Gregory the Great at left and St. Benedict at right. The upper level depicts an Angel of Annunciation and the Annunciation, while a central panel, perhaps a Dead Christ Supported by Angels or a Deposition from the Cross, is lost.

The general layout of the polyptych is rather traditional, such as the presence of gilt background. However, there is a series of more modern details which show Antonello's attention to novelties he saw or learned from the rest of Italy. These include the spatial unification of the panels (as in the steps at the base of the throne, which continue to the side panels), the use of tempera grassa derived from Netherlandish and Catalan artists working in the Kingdom of Naples, as well as the psychological characterization of the characters.

The polyptych was likely placed on a side wall, as testified by the observation angle, which is from right, and the tapestry behind the throne, which is not at the center. The upper level is instead optimized for view from below. There are also trompe-l'œil details, such as the saints' feet which apparently jut out from the step's edge, inspired by spatial innovations by northern Italian painters such as Andrea Mantegna. Also typical of northern European art was the attention to smaller details, including the pearls in Benedict's mitre, the brilliant cherries that the Child takes from his mother's hand, or the pearls in the rosary at the Virgin's feet.

The fruit in Jesus' hands symbolize the original sin and (the cherries) the Passion of Christ. He also wears a pendant in red coral, an apotropaic amulet of ancient origins usually given to children, which also appears in contemporary works by Piero della Francesca and other artists. The white and red roses in the crown which the angels release on the Virgin's head are also allegoric: they recall both her virginal purity and the future martyrdom of Christ.

== Sources ==
- Battisti, Eugenio (1985). Antonello, il teatro sacro, gli spazi, la donna (Il labirinto). Palermo: Novecento. ISBN 88-373-0021-2.
