= Caravaggio (1986 film) =

1986 film directed by Derek Jarman

- Directed by: Derek Jarman
- Screenplay by: Derek Jarman; Suso Cecchi d'Amico; Nicholas Ward-Jackson
- Story by: Nicholas Ward-Jackson
- Produced by: Sarah Radclyffe
- Starring: Nigel Terry; Sean Bean; Tilda Swinton
- Cinematography: Gabriel Beristain
- Edited by: George Akers
- Music by: Simon Fisher-Turner
- Distributed by: British Film Institute
- Release date: 29 August 1986 (United States)
- Running time: 93 minutes
- Country: United Kingdom
- Language: English
- Budget: £450,000 or £475,000
- Box office: £240,000 (UK)

Caravaggio is a 1986 British historical drama film directed by Derek Jarman. The film is a fictionalised retelling of the life of Baroque painter Michelangelo Merisi da Caravaggio.

== Plot ==
Told in a segmented fashion, the film opens as Caravaggio dies from lead poisoning while in exile, with only his long-time, mute companion Jerusaleme, who was given by his family to the artist as a boy, by his side. Caravaggio thinks back to his life as a teenage street ruffian who hustles and paints. While taken ill and in the care of priests, young Caravaggio catches the eye of Cardinal Francesco Maria del Monte. The Cardinal nurtures Caravaggio's artistic and intellectual development but seems to molest him.

As an adult, Caravaggio still lives under the roof of, and paints with the funding of, del Monte. Caravaggio is shown employing street people, drunks and prostitutes as models for his intense, usually religious paintings. He is depicted as frequently brawling, gambling, getting drunk and is implied to sleep with both male and female models. In the art world, Caravaggio is regarded as vulgar and entitled for his Vatican connections.

One day, Ranuccio, a street fighter for pay, catches Caravaggio's eye as a subject and potential lover. Ranuccio also introduces Caravaggio to his girlfriend Lena, who also becomes an object of attraction and a model to the artist. When both Ranuccio and Lena are separately caught kissing Caravaggio, each displays jealousy over the artist's attentions. One day, Lena announces she is pregnant without stating who the father is and will become a mistress to the wealthy Scipione Borghese. Soon, she is found murdered by drowning. Ranuccio weeps as Caravaggio and Jerusaleme clean Lena's body. Caravaggio is shown painting Lena after she dies and mournfully writhing with her body. Ranuccio is arrested for Lena's murder, but he claims to be innocent. Caravaggio pulls strings and goes to the pope to free Ranuccio. When Ranuccio is freed, he tells Caravaggio he killed Lena so they could be together. In response, Caravaggio cuts Ranuccio's throat, killing him. Back on his deathbed, Caravaggio is shown having visions of himself as a boy and trying to refuse the last rites offered him by the priests.

== Cast ==
- Nigel Terry as Caravaggio
  - Dexter Fletcher plays Boy Caravaggio
  - Noam Almaz plays Young Caravaggio
- Spencer Leigh as Jerusaleme
  - Emile Nicolaou plays Young Jerusaleme
- Dawn Archibald as Pipo
- Sean Bean as Ranuccio
- Tilda Swinton as Lena
- Jack Birkett as The Pope
- Robbie Coltrane as Scipione Borghese
- Sadie Corre as Princess Colonna
- Una Brandon-Jones as Weeping Woman
- Imogen Claire as Lady with the Jewels
- Garry Cooper as Davide
- Lol Coxhill as Old Priest
- Nigel Davenport as Giustiniani
- Vernon Dobtcheff as Art Lover
- Terry Downes as Bodyguard
- Michael Gough as Cardinal Del Monte
- Jonathan Hyde as Baglione
- Gene October as Model Peeling Fruit
- Cindy Oswin as Lady Elizabeth
- John Rogan as Vatican Official
- Zohra Sehgal as Jerusaleme's Grandmother
- Lucien Taylor as Boy with Guitar
- Simon Fisher Turner as Fra Filippo (as Simon Turner)

== Production ==
=== Development ===
The idea for a film on the life of the Italian painter Caravaggio was proposed to Jarman by the art dealer Nicholas Ward Jackson. At the time, Jarman knew little about Caravaggio’s life, but was drawn to the painter’s radical reworking of Christian iconography, particularly his use of contemporary figures as sacred subjects, such as portraying a street prostitute as Mary Magdalene.

While developing the project, Jarman drew parallels between Caravaggio and the Italian filmmaker Pier Paolo Pasolini. In his memoir Dancing Ledge, Jarman wrote: “Had Caravaggio been reincarnated in this century it would have been as a film-maker, Pasolini”. During this period, Jarman also wrote an unproduced screenplay, P.P.P. in the Garden of Earthly Delights, an account of Pasolini’s death which shared similarities with the eventual approach taken in Caravaggio.

Jarman wrote the first draft of the screenplay in Rome in 1978. Over the following years he produced approximately sixteen subsequent drafts, during which time he experienced considerable difficulty securing financing for the project. One draft, dated 1982, featured a metafictional framing device in which the filmmaker “Derek Jarman” is persuaded to make a pornographic film based on the life of Caravaggio.

During the extended development period before the film was eventually financed by the British Film Institute, Jarman remained active across multiple artistic disciplines. He painted, directed music videos including Marianne Faithfull’s Broken English (1979), designed sets for Ken Russell’s stage production of Stravinsky’s The Rake’s Progress (1982), published his memoir Dancing Ledge (1984), and returned to making Super 8 films. He also completed two significant feature-length projects, Imagining October (1984) and The Angelic Conversation (1985).

=== Casting ===
Jarman auditioned actors in his flat, filming them on video as part of the casting process. He cast Nigel Terry in the title role, in part because of Terry’s resemblance to the only known painted portrait traditionally identified as Caravaggio. The roles of Ranuccio and Lena were given to Sean Bean and Tilda Swinton respectively, both of whom were relative newcomers. Bean would later appear in Jarman’s War Requiem, while Caravaggio marked Swinton’s first feature film role; she would go on to collaborate extensively with Jarman until his death in 1994.

Jarman and composer Simon Fisher Turner, who also wrote the film’s score, searched for supporting performers and extras on the streets of London. By chance, Jarman encountered the secretary of the Circolo Gramsci, a society of Italian Communists, whose members subsequently assisted with casting. The cook Jennifer Paterson was an extra.

=== Production design ===
The production designer was Christopher Hobbs who was also responsible for the copies of Caravaggio paintings seen in the film. During pre-production, cinematographer Gabriel Beristain noticed that nearly all of Caravaggio’s pictures are lit from a light source from the left of the canvas; Hobbs resigned the sets accordingly to reflect this.

In keeping with Caravaggio's use of contemporary dress for his Biblical figures, Jarman intentionally includes several anachronisms in the film that do not fit with Caravaggio's life in the 16th century. In one scene, Caravaggio is in a bar lit with electric lights. Another character is seen using an electronic calculator. Car horns are heard honking outside Caravaggio's studio, and in one scene, Caravaggio is seen leaning on a green truck. Cigarette smoking, a motorbike, and the use of a manual typewriter also featured in the film.

=== Filming ===
Caravaggio was shot in a large derelict warehouse at Limehouse Studios in London’s Docklands. The production took place over a six-week shoot.

== Reception ==
=== Critical response ===
Caravaggio received largely positive reviews from critics, with particular praise directed towards its visual style, while Jarman's use of anachronism and unconventional approach to biography divided opinion.

Writing for The Scotsman, William Parente described the film as "a landmark in British film", praising its evocation of Caravaggio's chiaroscuro and comparing its visual confidence to Lawrence of Arabia. David Castell of The Sunday Telegraph praised Jarman for creating "a considerable film" that balanced accessibility with his distinctive artistic style despite its modest budget, while the Mail on Sunday wrote that the film advanced Jarman "to the front rank of British film-makers". In the Financial Times, Nigel Andrews singled out the film's humour for praise.

Several critics highlighted Jarman's painterly visual approach. David Robinson of The Times likewise considered it "one of the most visually handsome of British films", arguing that its originality outweighed perceived flaws in its dramatic structure and historical liberties. Derek Malcolm of The Guardian favourably compared the film to Giorgi Shengelaia's Pirosmani rather than conventional artist biopics. Edward Behr of Newsweek also praised the film, arguing that its restrictive 18 certificate could "only be explained in terms of latent homophobia".

Reviews were not uniformly enthusiastic. John Russell Taylor of Sight & Sound praised the film's ambition and craftsmanship but argued that, compared with the work of Robert Bresson or Pier Paolo Pasolini, it lacked emotional vitality. Mark Finch, writing in the Monthly Film Bulletin, concluded that while Caravaggio fell short of the masterpiece some had anticipated, it nevertheless remained a considerable film. Philip French of The Observer and Iain Johnstone of The Sunday Times were both critical of Jarman's deliberate anachronisms, while Adam Mars-Jones, writing in the New Statesman, argued that the film ultimately became an overly sombre mood piece. Although art critic Waldemar Januszczak praised Caravaggio as an example of atmospheric and inventive filmmaking, he criticised its departures from the historical record.

=== Accolades ===
The film was entered into the 36th Berlin International Film Festival where it won the Silver Bear for an outstanding single achievement.

In the same year, Jarman was shortlisted for the Turner Prize, the annual award for the artist judged to have made the greatest contribution to British art. In announcing the shortlist, the Tate Gallery cited “the outstanding visual qualities of his films,” with particular reference to Caravaggio.

== Home media ==
Caravaggio was released on DVD by Umbrella Entertainment in July 2008. The DVD is compatible with all region codes and includes special features such as the trailer, a gallery of production designs and storyboards, feature commentary by Gabriel Beristain, an interview with Christopher Hobbs titled Italy of the Memory, and interviews with Tilda Swinton, Derek Jarman, Nigel Terry.

== See also ==
- BFI Top 100 British films
