= Saint Jerome Writing =

Painting by Caravaggio

Saint Jerome
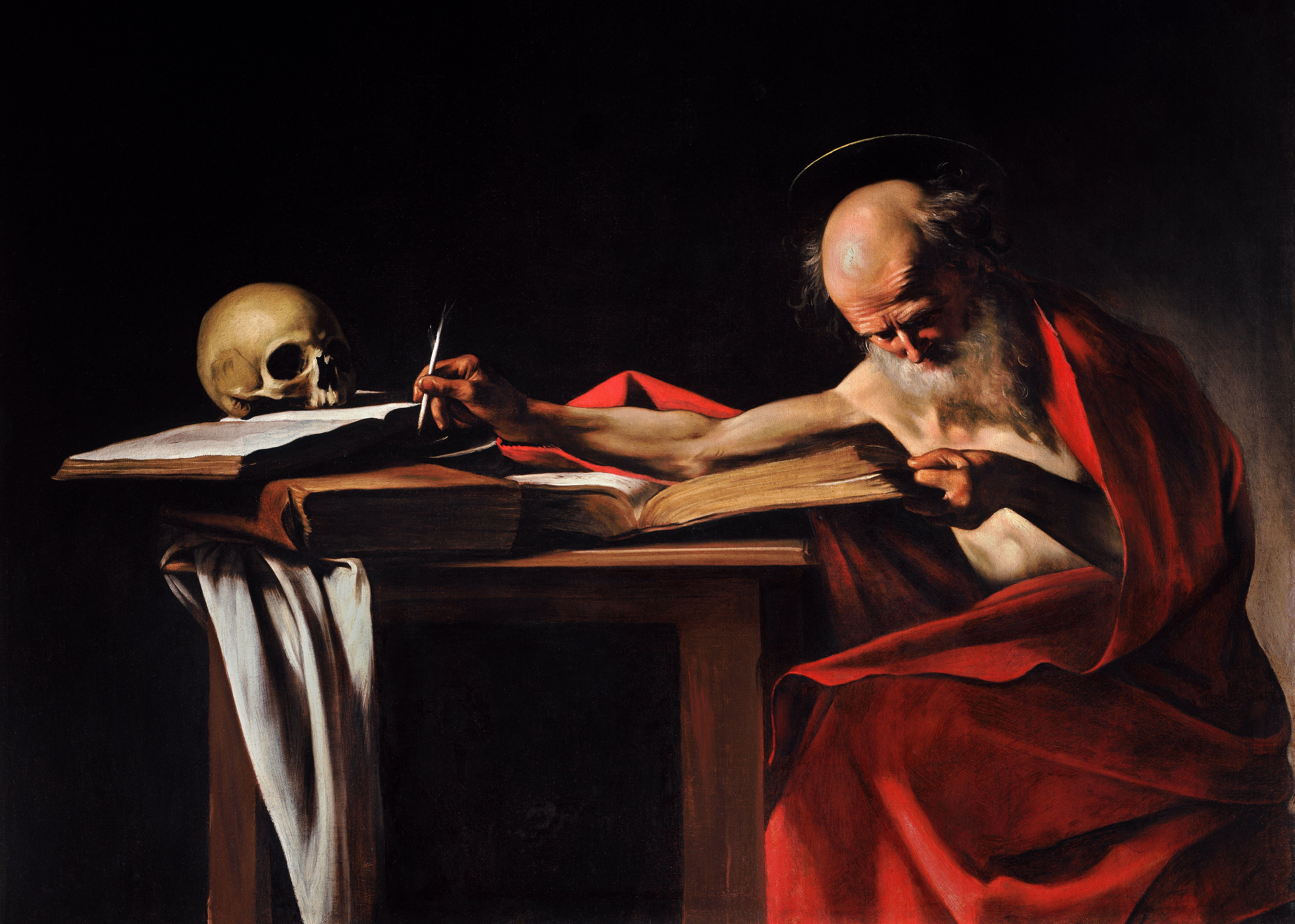
- Artist: Caravaggio
- Year: c. 1605-1606
- Medium: Oil on canvas
- Dimensions: 112 cm × 157 cm (44 in × 62 in)
- Location: Galleria Borghese; Rome

Saint Jerome Writing, also called Saint Jerome in His Study or simply Saint Jerome, is an oil painting by the Italian Baroque master Caravaggio, from c. 1605-1606. The painting is located in the Galleria Borghese, in Rome.

== Composition ==
The painting depicts Saint Jerome, a Doctor of the Church in Roman Catholicism and a popular subject for painting, even for Caravaggio, who produced other paintings of Jerome in meditation and engaged in writing. In this image, Jerome is reading intently, an outstretched arm resting with quill. It has been suggested that Jerome is depicted in the act of translating the Vulgate.

== History ==
The painting is generally dated to 1605–06, largely on the statements of 17th-century art historical biographer Gian Pietro Bellori, though Denis Mahon suggests 1602–1604. According to Bellori, Caravaggio produced the piece at the behest of Cardinal Scipione Borghese, who became a cardinal in 1605, but it is possible that Borghese acquired it later as it is not mentioned in a 1613 poem by Scipione Francucci that described the Borghese Caravaggio collection. Whether or not the dating is accurate, the work is believed to have originated from Caravaggio's late Roman period, which ended with the painter's exile to Malta in 1606.

The autorship of Saint Jerome Writing by Caravaggio is sometimes questioned, as it was attributed to Jusepe de Ribera in the Borghese inventories from 1700 until 1893.

== See also ==
- List of paintings by Caravaggio
