= Keith Christiansen =

Keith Christiansen may refer to:

- Keith Christiansen (art historian), American art historian
- Keith Christiansen (ice hockey), American ice hockey player

== See also ==
- Keith Christensen, American football player
