= The Burial of Saint Lucy =

Painting by Caravaggio

- Seppellimento di Santa Lucia (Italian)
- Artist: Caravaggio
- Year: 1608
- Medium: Oil on canvas
- Dimensions: 408 cm × 300 cm (161 in × 120 in)
- Location: Chiesa di Santa Lucia al Sepolcro; Syracuse

Burial of Saint Lucy is a painting by the Italian artist Caravaggio. It is located in the church of Santa Lucia al Sepolcro in Syracuse, Sicily.

== History ==
According to The Golden Legend, Saint Lucy had bestowed her wealth on the poor, in gratitude for the miraculous healing of her mother. Denounced as a Christian by her own suitor who wrongly suspected her of infidelity, she refused to recant, offered her chastity to Christ, and was sentenced to be dragged to a brothel. Miraculously, nothing could move her or displace her from the spot where she stood. She was pierced by a knife in the throat and, where she fell, the church of Santa Lucia al Sepolcro in Syracuse was built.

Caravaggio had escaped from prison on Malta in 1608, fleeing to Syracuse. There his Roman companion Mario Minniti helped him get a commission for the present altarpiece. Caravaggio painted it in 1608, for the Franciscan church of Santa Lucia al Sepolcro. The choice of subject was driven by the fact that Saint Lucy was the patron saint of Syracuse and had been interred below the church. The subject was unusual, but especially important to the local authorities, who were eager to reinforce the local cult of Saint Lucy, which had sustained a setback with the theft of her remains during the Middle Ages.

== Style ==
The similarities of the painting with Caravaggio's Resurrection of Lazarus has been pointed out and the scholar Howard Hibbard has spoken of the "powerful emptiness" of the final rendered version of the painting.

X-rays of the painting revealed that originally Saint Lucy was beheaded, following the Greek version of her hagiography, but he changed the painting to only show a cut in her throat, following the Latin version. Caravaggio depicted beheadings multiple times in his work, including Judith beheading Holofernes, The beheading of Saint John the Baptist, David with the head of Goliath and Medusa, but he probably changed the beheading in this painting due to a request of the city’s senate.

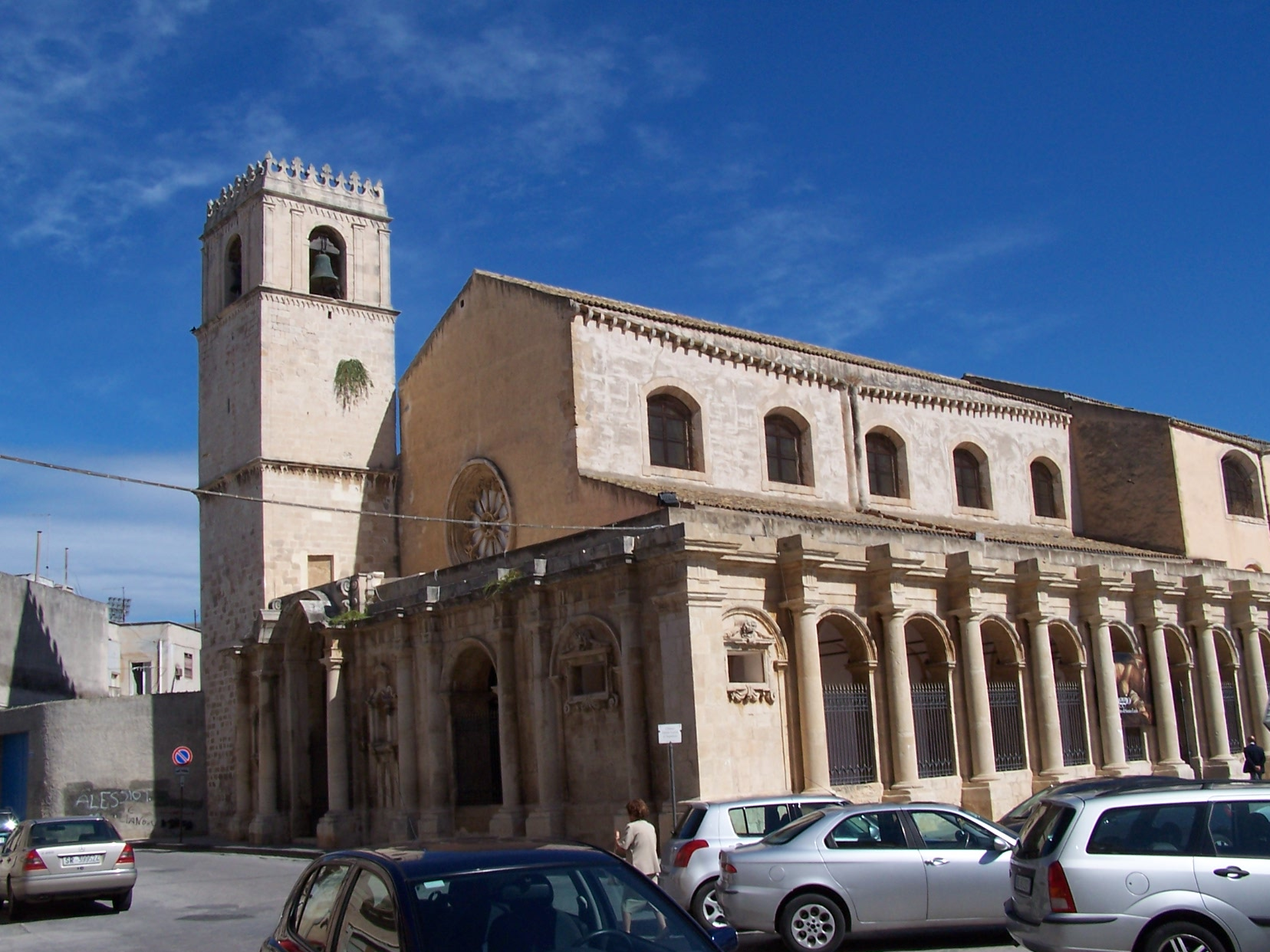
The church of Santa Lucia al Sepulcro in Syracuse.

== See also ==
- List of paintings by Caravaggio
