= The Martyrdom of Saint Ursula (Caravaggio) =

Painting by Caravaggio

- Martirio di Sant' Orsola (Italian)
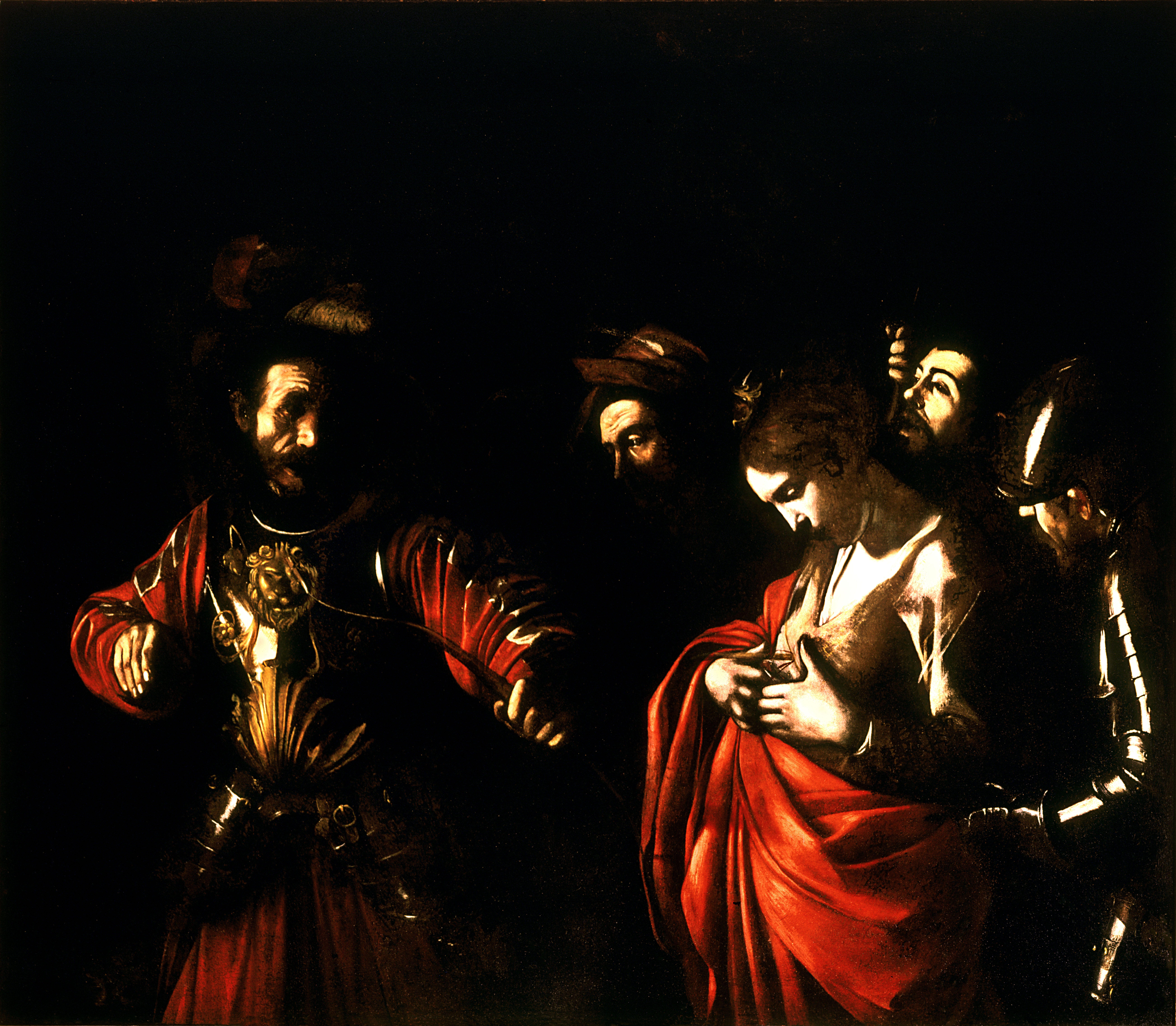
- Artist: Caravaggio
- Year: 1610
- Medium: Oil on canvas
- Dimensions: 140.5 cm × 170.5 cm (55.3 in × 67.1 in)
- Location: Gallerie d'Italia di Napoli, Naples

The Martyrdom of Saint Ursula (1610) is a painting by the Italian artist Caravaggio (1571–1610) and thought to be his last painting. It is in the Intesa Sanpaolo Gallerie d'Italia collection in the former headquarters of the Banco di Napoli in Naples.

== History ==
According to one version of the legend of Saint Ursula, she and her eleven thousand virgin companions were captured by the Huns. The eleven thousand virgins were slaughtered, but the king of the Huns was overcome by Ursula's modesty and beauty and begged her forgiveness if only she would marry him. Ursula replied that she would not, upon which the king shot her with an arrow.

Caravaggio painted Saint Ursula in 1610 in Naples for Marcantonio Doria, a 25-year-old nobleman from Genoa. Doria had become an ardent collector of Caravaggio's work, and he commissioned the painting to mark the entry of his stepdaughter into a religious order as Sister Ursula. The date of the painting can be identified at shortly prior to 11 May 1610, when Doria's procurator in Naples, Lanfranco Massa, wrote to his master that the painting was finished. There had been a slight accident, the agent wrote, when he had tried to hasten the drying by leaving it out in the sun the day before, softening the varnish. The agent told Doria not to worry as he would take it back to Caravaggio to be fixed and, in fact, Doria should commission more works from the artist as "people are fighting over him and this is a good chance". However, this may be a reference to another artist Doria had also commissioned work from. The original source document is unclear. The painting was received in Genoa on 18 June and Doria was delighted, placing it with his Raphaels and Leonardos and his vial of the authentic blood of John the Baptist.

In his will of 19 October 1651, Doria left his art collection to his eldest son Nicolò, Prince of Angri and Duke of Eboli. The estate was transferred to Naples by Maria Doria Cattaneo in 1832. The painting is listed in the inventory of Giovan Carlo Doria's inheritance, taken in 1854–55, in the Palazzo Doria d'Angri allo Spirito Santo, Naples.

Caravaggio had arrived in Naples from Sicily in September or October 1609. Within days he was attacked outside a restaurant by four armed men, leading to rumours that he had been killed or facially disfigured. It is probable that he took a long time to convalesce, and it is difficult to link more than a handful of works, and most of them hesitantly, to this second stay in the city. The Saint Ursula, however, can be positively identified. It marks yet another change in style: in Sicily he had continued the compositional scheme introduced with The Beheading of Saint John the Baptist, a small group of figures dwarfed by massive architecture, but Ursula marks a return to a scene which brings the action directly into the space of the viewer, at the very moment when the Hun king lets fly his arrow, and Ursula looks down with an expression of mild surprise at the shaft sticking out of her chest. To the right and rear a few onlookers stare in shock, one of them, the upturned face behind Ursula, apparently Caravaggio himself. Everyone who had seen the painting had been stunned, Doria's agent reported. Doria himself might have been glad to see his favorite artist, unmarked despite all the rumors.

Saint Ursula is said to have been Caravaggio's last painting. In July he set off by boat to receive a pardon from the Pope for his part in the death of a young man in a duel in 1606. But instead of the pardon, he died; exactly how is unclear, although a fever is most frequently quoted as the cause, at Porto Ercole, on the coast north of Rome. A discussion of his death is given in the article on John the Baptist.

== Modern repairs ==
Damage to the painting occurred shortly after its completion. The painting had been exposed to sunlight in an attempt to hasten drying of its varnish, but instead the exposure resulted in damage that obscured some details of the painting. Repair of the painting has been attempted several times, without much success.

In 2025, a restoration aided by X-ray analysis of the painting was conducted by Laura Cibrario and Fabiola Jatta is reported to have improved color brilliance and revealed some obscured details that allow better interpretation of the painting.

== See also ==
- List of paintings by Caravaggio
