= Museo Civico Ala Ponzone =

Public museum and art gallery in Cremona, Italy

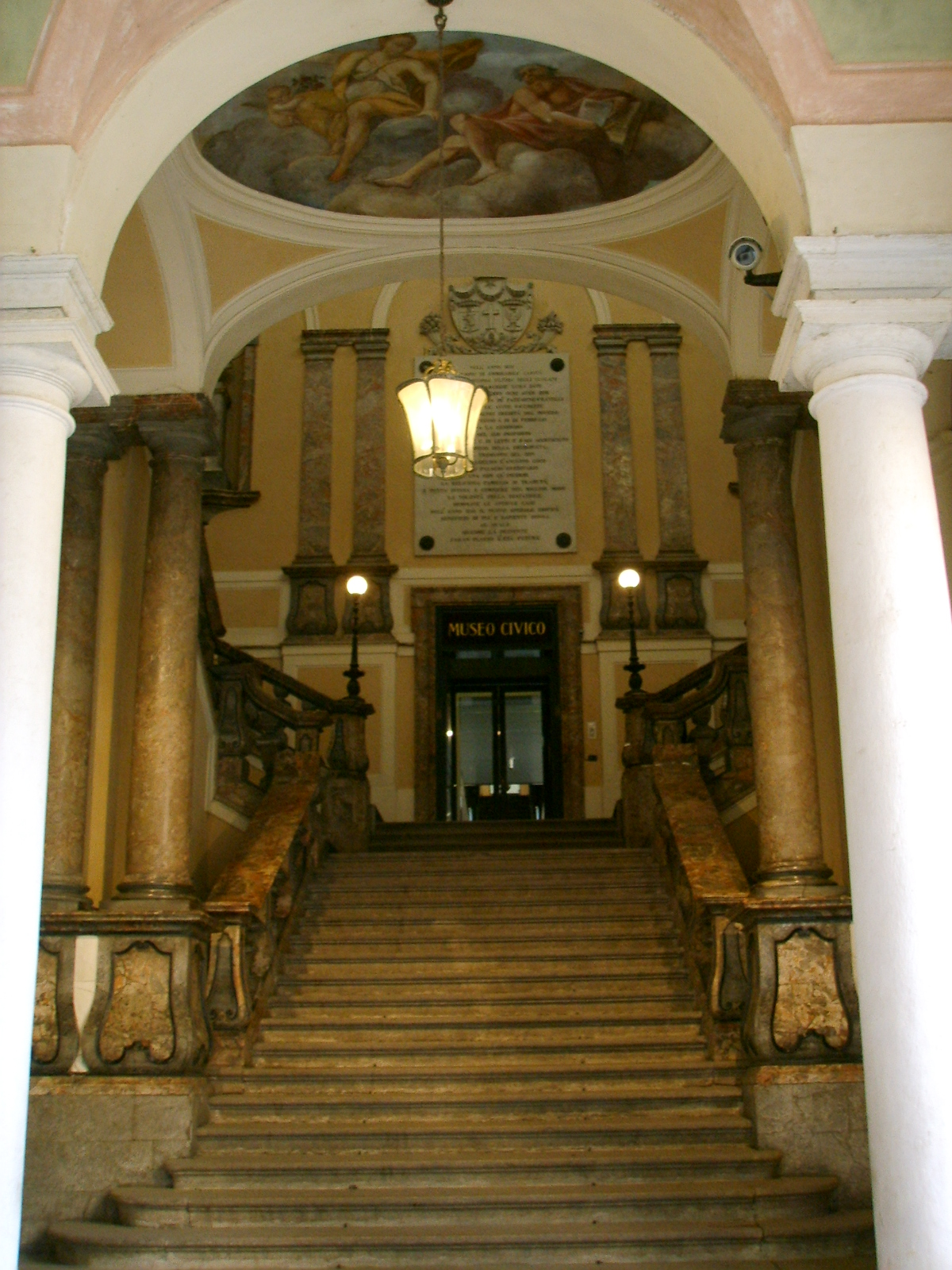
Museo Civico Ala Ponzone

Museo Civico Ala Ponzone is a public museum and art gallery located in the 16th-century Palazzo Affaitati in Cremona, Italy.

== History ==
The core of the original collection was donated in 1842 by Giuseppe Sigismondo Ala Ponzone and was supplemented from works from suppressed ecclesiastical institutions. Among the works in the collection are a Saint Francis in Meditation by Caravaggio and The Gardener by Giuseppe Arcimboldo.

In the Sala del Platina, a section in the museum, is a large sacristy armoire or cabinet, called the Armadio del Platina, originally from Cremona Cathedral. The Renaissance-style wood cabinet has a series of intarsia tableaux, completed during 1477–1480 by Giovanni Maria da Piadena, called il Platina, and restored for this museum in 2007.

The museum also houses historic musical instruments, with the nucleus being a collection donated by Carlo Alberto Carutti.
