= Giuseppe Sigismondo Ala Ponzone =

Italian collector and entomologist

Giuseppe Sigismondo Ala Ponzone (21 March 1761 – 2 May 1842) was an Italian collector and entomologist.

Born in Cremona, Ponzone assembled large collections of art and natural history. These are now in the Museo Civico Ala Ponzone of his native city. He bequeathed his library to Biblioteca Ambrosiana in Milan. In 1789 he wrote a paper on moths.
