= Mary Magdalen in Ecstasy =

Painting by Caravaggio

- Maddalena in estasi (Italian)
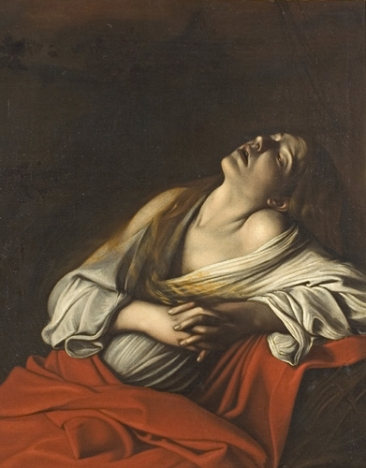
- Artist: Caravaggio
- Year: 1606
- Medium: oil on canvas
- Dimensions: 103.5 cm × 91.5 cm (40.75 in × 36 in)
- Location: Private collection

Mary Magdalen in Ecstasy (1606) is a painting by the Italian baroque artist Michelangelo Merisi da Caravaggio (1571–1610). What is believed to be the authentic version of the painting was discovered in a private collection in 2014; the painting was previously only known to art historians through a number of copies made by followers of the artist.

It is widely accepted that Caravaggio painted the work in 1606 while in hiding at the estates of the Colonna family after fleeing Rome following the killing of Ranuccio Tommason.

== Subject ==
According to a legend popular in Caravaggio's time, after Christ's death his faithful female disciple Mary of Magdala moved to southern France, where she lived as a hermit in a cave at Sainte-Baume near Aix-en-Provence. There she was transported seven times a day by angels into the presence of God, "where she heard, with her bodily ears, the delightful harmonies of the celestial choirs." Earlier artists had depicted Mary ascending into the divine presence through multicoloured clouds accompanied by angels; Caravaggio made the supernatural an entirely interior experience, with the Magdalen alone against a featureless dark background, caught in a ray of intense light, her head lolling back and eyes stained with tears. This revolutionary naturalistic interpretation of the legend also allowed him to capture the ambiguous parallel between mystical and erotic love, in Mary's semi-reclining posture and bared shoulder. The painting was immensely influential for future treatment of the theme by artists such as Rubens and Simon Vouet (who adopted Carvaggio's earth-bound Magdalen but reintroduced the angels), and of Bernini's celebrated Ecstasy of St Theresa. Mary Magdalene in Ecstasy was believed to be lost for centuries, its whereabouts unknown following Caravaggio's tumultuous final years. In 2014, the painting resurfaced and was subsequently authenticated as an original masterpiece by a team of leading art historians, including renowned Italian scholar Mina Gregori. Its rediscovery was a groundbreaking moment in the art world, offering fresh insight into Caravaggio's later works.

== See also ==
- List of paintings by Caravaggio
