= Saint Francis in Meditation (Caravaggio) =

Painting by Caravaggio

St Francis in Meditation
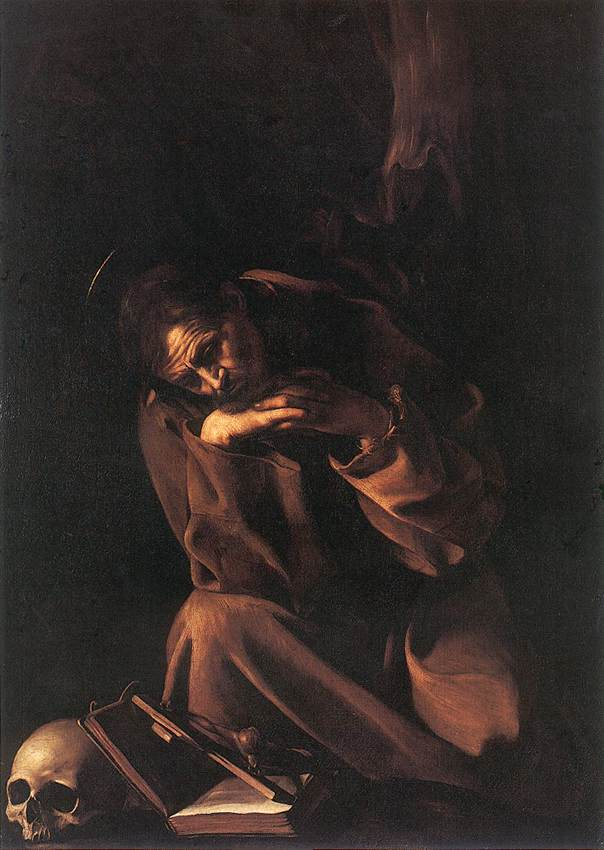
- Artist: Caravaggio
- Year: c. 1604-1610
- Medium: Oil on canvas
- Dimensions: 130 cm × 90 cm (51 in × 35 in)
- Location: Museo Civico Ala Ponzone; Cremona

Saint Francis in Meditation (c. 1604/06 or 1607/10) is a painting by the Italian Baroque master Caravaggio in the Museo Civico, Cremona.

This is one of two paintings of almost identical measurements by Caravaggio showing Saint Francis of Assisi contemplating a skull (see Saint Francis in Prayer). Neither is documented and both are disputed, although the dispute is as to whether they are originals or copies. The dating of both is highly uncertain, although the cypress trunk behind this Saint Francis is very reminiscent of the tree behind the Corsini John the Baptist.

== Background ==
St Francis was a popular subject during the Counter-Reformation, when the Church stressed the virtues of poverty and the imitation of Christ.

== See also ==
- List of paintings by Caravaggio
