= Helen Langton =

British academic

Helen Langton MBE
- Occupations: Nursing and lecturing

Helen Eileen Langton MBE is a British academic, a nurse and the former Vice-Chancellor of the University of Suffolk.

== Career ==
Langton has held numerous positions at universities in the United Kingdom, such associate Dean at both Coventry University and University of Derby. She was deputy Vice-Chancellor at the University of South Wales, and Vice-Chancellor at the University of Suffolk from 2018 until her retirement in the summer of 2024.

She has been a member of both National and International Bodies such as Nursing and Midwifery Council, Academy of Health care Improvement, Associate editor of International Journals of Child Health Care, and Board Member for the De Souza Nursing Institute in Toronto, Canada.

Langton was appointed Member of the Order of the British Empire (MBE) in the 2023 Birthday Honours for services to education.
