= Imagining October =

1984 British experimental short film by Derek Jarman

- Directed by: Derek Jarman
- Written by: Shaun Allen; Derek Jarman
- Produced by: James Mackay
- Cinematography: Richard Heslop; Derek Jarman; Carl Johnson; Sally Potter; Cerith Wyn Evans
- Edited by: Peter Cartwright; Richard Heslop; Derek Jarman; Cerith Wyn Evans
- Music by: Dave Ball; Genesis P-Orridge
- Release date: 11 November 1984 (London Film Festival)
- Running time: 27 minutes
- Country: United Kingdom
- Language: English

Imagining October is a 1984 British experimental short film directed by Derek Jarman. The film was made following Jarman’s visit to Moscow in September 1984 and premiered at the BFI London Film Festival on 11 November 1984.

== Background ==
In September 1984, Jarman was invited to Moscow to present The Tempest alongside films including Sally Potter’s The Gold Diggers, both of which provoked controversy among officials and audiences.

During the visit, Jarman visted the Moscow apartment that housing Sergei Eisenstein’s English-language library. There, film theorist Peter Wollen discovered Eisenstein’s copy of John Reed’s Ten Days That Shook the World, in which the name of Leon Trotsky had been systematically inked out. Jarman filmed Wollen turning the pages of the censored book, and also filmed himself sitting in Eisenstein’s chair.

== Content ==
The film opens with the caption: “Sitting on Eisenstein’s chair – Moscow 1984 – October,” followed by footage of Jarman seated in Eisenstein’s study.

It combines slow-motion images of fire, Moscow architecture, and footage of Peter Wollen handling the censored copy of Reed’s book. Intertitles emcompass political slogans and poetic fragments. The captions were originally written as a continuous voice-over text but were restructured into on-screen slogans following a suggestion by Shaun Allen, echoing Eisenstein’s use of intertitles.

To supplement the Russian material, Jarman filmed painter John Watkiss in London creating works in a style resembling Soviet Realism. In sequences designed by Christopher Hobbs, Watkiss painted five young men (including the painter Peter Doig) dressed in British military uniform and carrying a red flag, forming staged tableaux.

The soundtrack includes Benjamin Britten’s setting of William Blake’s “O Rose, Thou Art Sick”, alongside music commissioned from Genesis P-Orridge and Dave Ball.

== Production ==
Funding for Imagining October initially came from Jarman’s friends. Shortly before the London Film Festival, Peter Sainsbury provided funds to transfer the footage via video to 16mm.

The film’s depiction of the censored book provoked concern among Berlin Film Festival selectors and Soviet officials, who viewed it as politically provocative. Jarman agreed to make alterations to the film, including the removal or obscuring of certain captions and images, in order to avoid causing difficulties for his hosts in the USSR.

Although the British Film Institute expressed interest in distributing the film commercially, release was complicated by the cost of clearing music rights for Britten’s composition.

== Reception ==
Imagining October premiered late at night at the Lumière cinema in St Martin’s Lane during the 1984 London Film Festival and received a generally warm reception. In a retrospective review, Oliver Basciano of ArtReview called it "dated" but noted that "it is a document of an artist attempting to navigate power relations".
