= The Raising of Lazarus (Caravaggio) =

Painting by Caravaggio

- Resurrezione di Lazzaro (Italian)
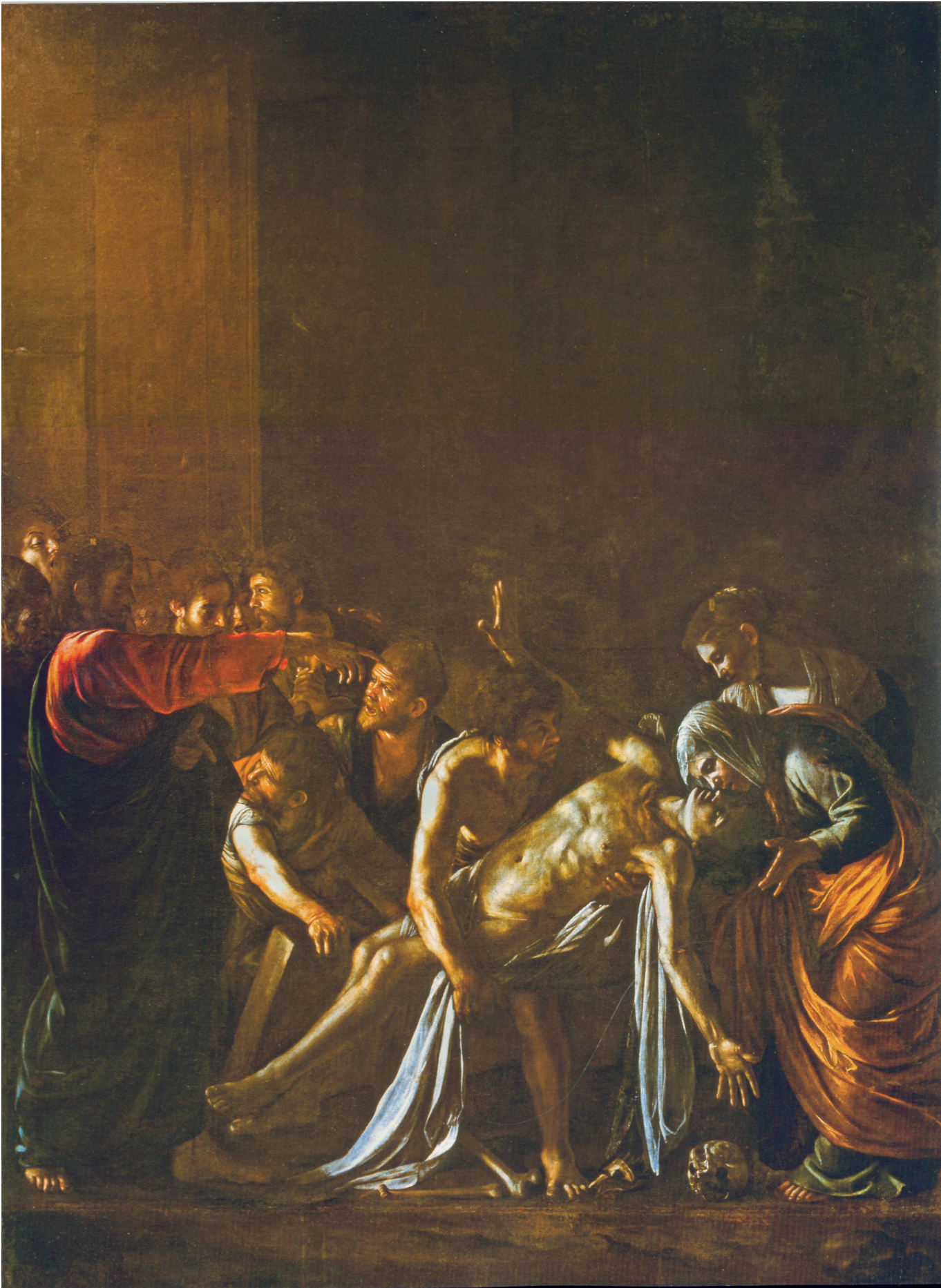
- Artist: Caravaggio
- Year: c. 1609
- Medium: Oil on canvas
- Dimensions: 380 cm × 275 cm (150 in × 108 in)
- Location: Regional Museum of Messina, Messina

The Raising of Lazarus is an oil on canvas painting completed around 1609 by the Italian Baroque master Caravaggio. Housed in the Regional Museum of Messina in Sicily, the altarpiece depicts the biblical miracle from the Gospel of John in which Jesus restores Lazarus of Bethany to life.

The painting was commissioned by the Genoese merchant Giovanni Battista de' Lazzari for the church of the Padri Crociferi in Messina.

== History and description ==
In August 1608 Caravaggio fled from Malta, where he had been imprisoned for an unknown crime, and took refuge in Sicily with his friend, the artist Mario Minniti. Through Minniti's intercession he procured a number of important commissions, including this for the church of the Padri Crociferi in Messina, where it was presented by the wealthy Genoese merchant Giovanni Battista de' Lazzari on 10 June 1609. The fee was a thousand scudi, more than double any Caravaggio had received previously.

Lazarus, the brother of Martha of Bethany and Mary of Bethany, was the patron saint of Giovanni Battista de' Lazzari, to whom Caravaggio was contracted to paint an altarpiece in the church of the Padri Crociferi. The Gospel of John tells how he fell sick, died, was buried and then miraculously raised from the dead by Christ. As in several paintings from this period of Caravaggio's career, the scene is set against blank walls that overwhelm the frieze of human actors. The interaction of the relief of figures caught in corporate effort and emotion, with a large void above, is quite different from the closely focussed individualised dramas of his early and middle periods. As is usual with Caravaggio, light becomes an important element in the drama, picking out crucial details such as Lazarus's hands—one lax and open to receive, the other reaching towards Christ—and the wonder-struck faces of the onlookers.

The old story that Caravaggio had a freshly buried body exhumed for this painting is "probably apocryphal, but not beyond the bounds of possibility" (John Gash, see below). Some of the figures were said to be modelled on members of the community, but Caravaggio has also relied on his memory—the whole design is based on an engraving after Giulio Romano and his Jesus is a reversed image of the Christ who called Matthew to join him in The Calling of Saint Matthew. The painting is in poor condition and much restored, and it's possible that some passages are the work of assistants.

According to Francesco Susinno, Caravaggio had produced a first version that he destroyed with a razor after adverse criticism. Subsequently he would have finished in record time the present version, but probably this account is fanciful.

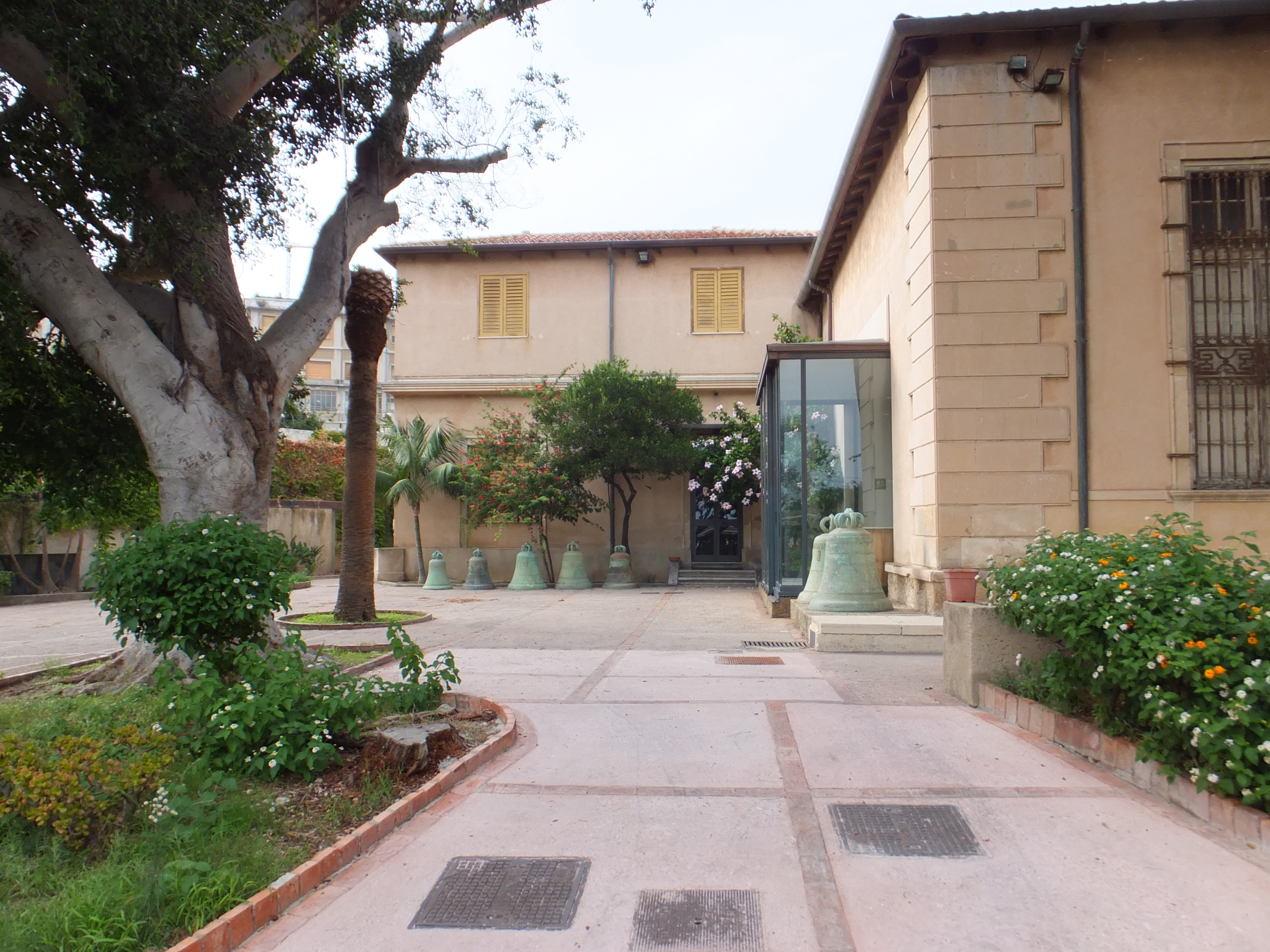
Museo Regionale di Messina, Sicily

== See also ==
- List of paintings by Caravaggio
