= Keith Christiansen (art historian) =

American art historian, curator, and author

Keith Christiansen (born 1947 in Seattle, Washington) is an American art historian, curator, and author. He was the chairman of the department of European paintings at New York City's Metropolitan Museum of Art from 2009 to 2021.

== Education ==
Christiansen did his undergraduate studies at the University of California, Santa Cruz where he received his B.A. in history and French literature in 1969. He remained in California and attended the University of California, Los Angeles where he received his Masters of the Arts in 1971. He next received his PhD in art history from Harvard University in 1977.

== Career ==
Christiansen started working at the Metropolitan Museum when his graduate studies finished in 1977, and became the John Pope-Hennessy Chairman of the European paintings department at the museum in 2009. Christiansen curated and or coordinated many exhibitions at the museum including: The Age of Caravaggio (1985), The Age of Correggio and the Carracci (1986–87), Caravaggio's Cardsharps Rediscovered (1987), Andrea Mantegna's Descent into Limbo (1988), Painting in Renaissance Siena: 1420–1500 (1988–89), A Caravaggio Rediscovered: The Lute Player (1990), Andrea Mantegna (1992), Jusepe de Ribera (1992), Giambattista Tiepolo (1996–97), From Van Eyck to Bruegel: Early Netherlandish Painting at The Metropolitan Museum of Art (1998–99), Donato Creti: Melancholy and Perfection (1998), Orazio and Artemisia Gentileschi (2001–2002), El Greco (2003–2004), From Filippo Lippi to Piero della Francesca: Fra Carnevale and the Making of a Renaissance Master (2005), Raphael at the Metropolitan: The Colonna Altarpiece (2006), Poussin and Nature (2008), and Michelangelo's First Painting (2009).

Christiansen announced his retirement from the Metropolitan Museum in 2020.

== 2020 controversy ==
In June 2020 Christiansen published an Instagram post criticizing the destruction of monuments by "zealots". He uploaded a picture of a pen and ink drawing by the archaeologist Alexandre Lenoir (1769–1831) showing his efforts to try to save monuments during the French Revolution, with the caption "Alexandre Lenoir battling the revolutionary zealots bent on destroying the royal tombs in Saint Denis. How many great works of art have been lost to the desire to rid ourselves of a past of which we don't approve". The post was published on Juneteenth and considered by some to be a commentary on Black Lives Matter protestors. This led to fifteen staff at the Metropolitan Museum of Art writing to the museum's leadership asking for recognition of "what we see as the expression of a deeply rooted logic of white supremacy and culture of systemic racism at our institution". A day before the staff letter was sent, Christiansen apologized to the European paintings department, calling his Instagram post "not only not appropriate and misguided in its judgment but simply wrong".

== Publications ==
Christiansen is the co-author with Judith W. Mann of Orazio and Artemisia Gentileschi (2001) from the Met Publications.

Christiansen edited From Filippo Lippi to Piero della Francesca: Fra Carnevale and the Making of a Renaissance Master (Met publications 2005) as well as contributing an essay to the volume.

He is the co-curator with Carlo Falciani of the 2021 exhibition The Medici Portraits and Politics, 1512–1570 at the Metropolitan Museum as well as the co-editor (again with Falciani) of the corresponding book from Yale University Press.

He was the co-editor with Maryan W. Ainsworth of From Van Eyck to Bruegel: Early Netherlandish Painting in The Metropolitan Museum of Art.
