= The Beheading of Saint John the Baptist (Caravaggio) =

Painting by Caravaggio

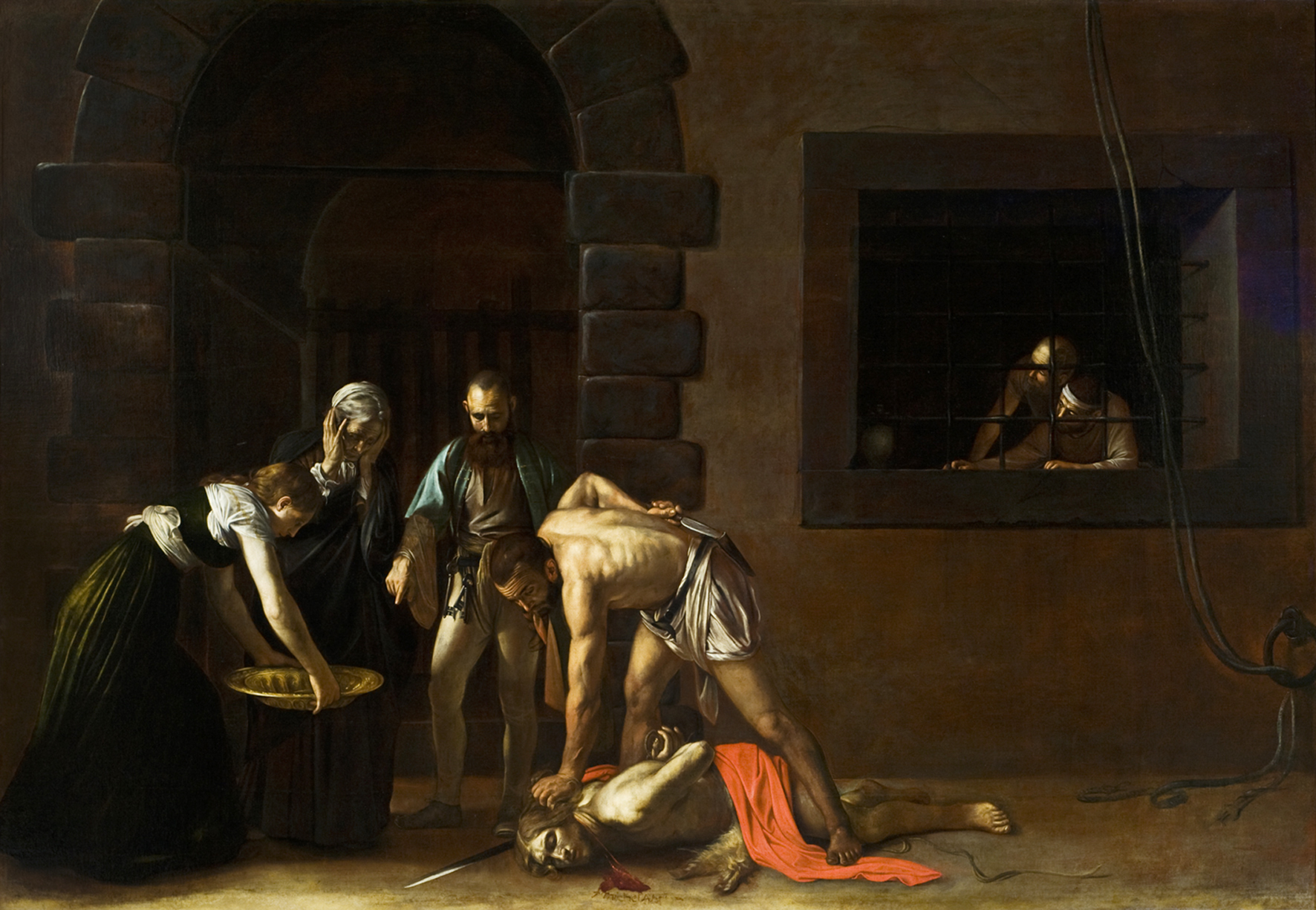
- Artist: Caravaggio
- Year: 1608
- Medium: Oil on canvas
- Dimensions: 370 cm × 520 cm (150 in × 200 in)
- Location: St. John's Co-Cathedral, Valletta

The Beheading of Saint John the Baptist is an oil painting by the Italian artist Caravaggio. Measuring 3.7 m by 5.2 m, it depicts the execution of John the Baptist. It is located in the Oratory of St. John's Co-Cathedral in Valletta, Malta.

According to Andrea Pomella in Caravaggio: An Artist through Images (2005), the work is widely considered to be Caravaggio's masterpiece as well as "one of the most important works in Western painting." Jonathan Jones has described The Beheading of Saint John the Baptist as one of the ten greatest works of art of all time: "Death and human cruelty are laid bare by this masterpiece, as its scale and shadow daunt and possess the mind."

== Composition ==
The painting, in oil on canvas, is 12 ft (3.7 m) by 17 ft (5.2 m) and prominent are the vivid red and warm yellow colours, common to the Baroque period with the use of chiaroscuro. The image depicts the execution of John the Baptist while nearby a servant girl stands with a golden platter to receive his head. Another woman, who has been identified as Herodias or simply a bystander who realizes that the execution is wrong, stands by in shock while a jailer issues instructions and the executioner draws his dagger to finish the beheading. The scene, popular with Italian artists in general and with Caravaggio himself, is not directly inspired by the Bible, but rather by the tale as related in the Golden Legend.

It is the only work by Caravaggio to bear the artist's signature, which he placed in red blood spilling from the Baptist's cut throat. There is considerable empty space in the image, but because the canvas is quite large the figures are approximately life-sized.

Caravaggio likely drew the background for his work from his memories of time in prison in Rome or research into the prison of the Knights of Malta where he would—coincidentally—be detained after he completed this work.

== History ==
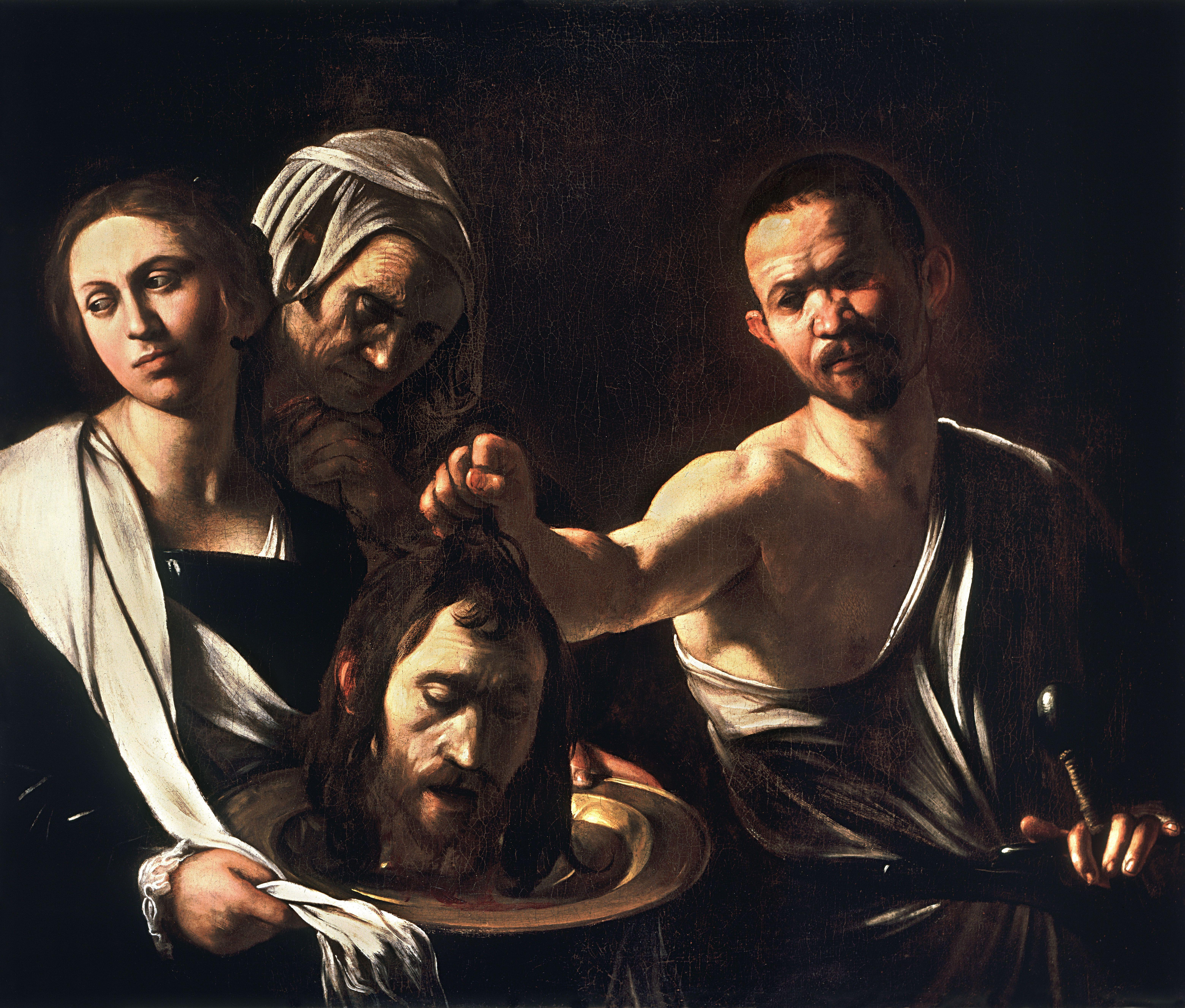
Salome with the Head of John the Baptist, Caravaggio (London)

Completed in 1608 in Malta, the painting had been commissioned by the Knights of Malta as an altarpiece; it was the largest altarpiece which Caravaggio would ever paint. It still hangs in St. John's Co-Cathedral, for which it was commissioned and where Caravaggio himself was inducted and briefly served as a knight. Caravaggio's service to the Order was brief and troubled, however, as he was soon a fugitive from justice, having escaped while imprisoned for an unrecorded crime. When Caravaggio was defrocked in absentia as a "foul and rotten member" by the Order about six months after his induction, the ceremony took place in the Oratory, before this very painting.

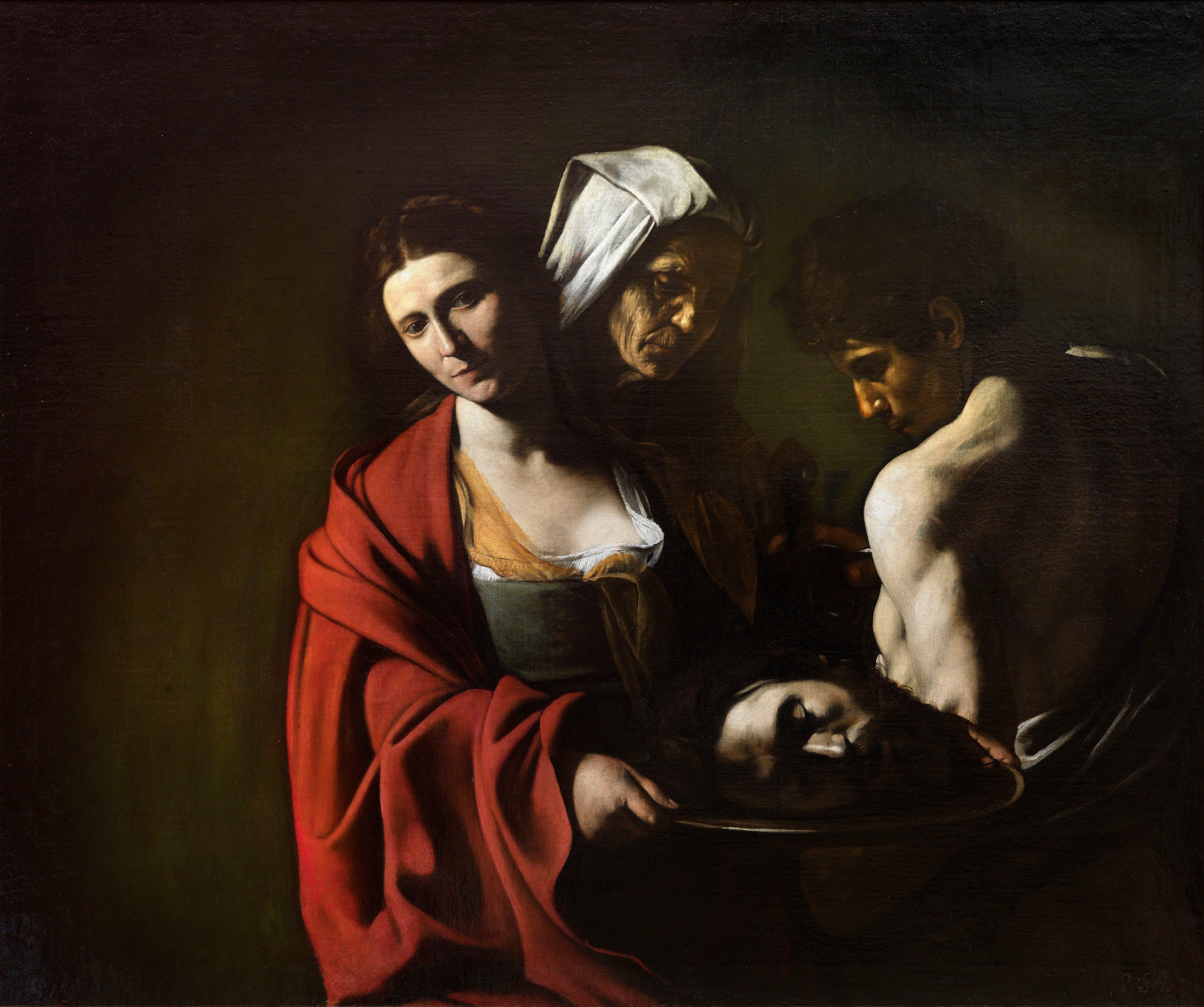
Salome with the Head of John the Baptist, Caravaggio (Madrid)

Caravaggio did several pieces depicting the moments after the event depicted here. One of these is on display in London's National Gallery; the other, in the Royal Palace of Madrid. It is believed that one of these may be the image that Caravaggio was said to have sent in an effort to appease Alof de Wignacourt, Grand Master of the Knights who expelled Caravaggio, but this is not certainly known.

The Beheading of Saint John the Baptist has been badly damaged, though it did receive some restoration in the 1950s prior to a notable exhibition in Rome in 1955–56, which brought the work considerable attention. It was during the restoration that Caravaggio's signature in the blood became visible to modern viewers. The signature is a matter of some dispute. The work is signed f. Michelang.o (the f to indicate his brotherhood in the order), but it is popularly claimed that Caravaggio signed "I, Caravaggio, did this" in confession of some crime—perhaps connected to the 1606 death of Ranuccio Tomassoni at Caravaggio's hands, which had caused the painter to flee Rome.

In the summer of 2023, the windows in the oratory of the decollato were permanently shuttered and blocked off natural light. This decision caused a public outcry amongst art historians, Caravaggio scholars and Maltese citizens which was ignored by authorities.

== See also ==
- List of paintings by Caravaggio
