= Caravaggio =

Italian painter (1571–1610)

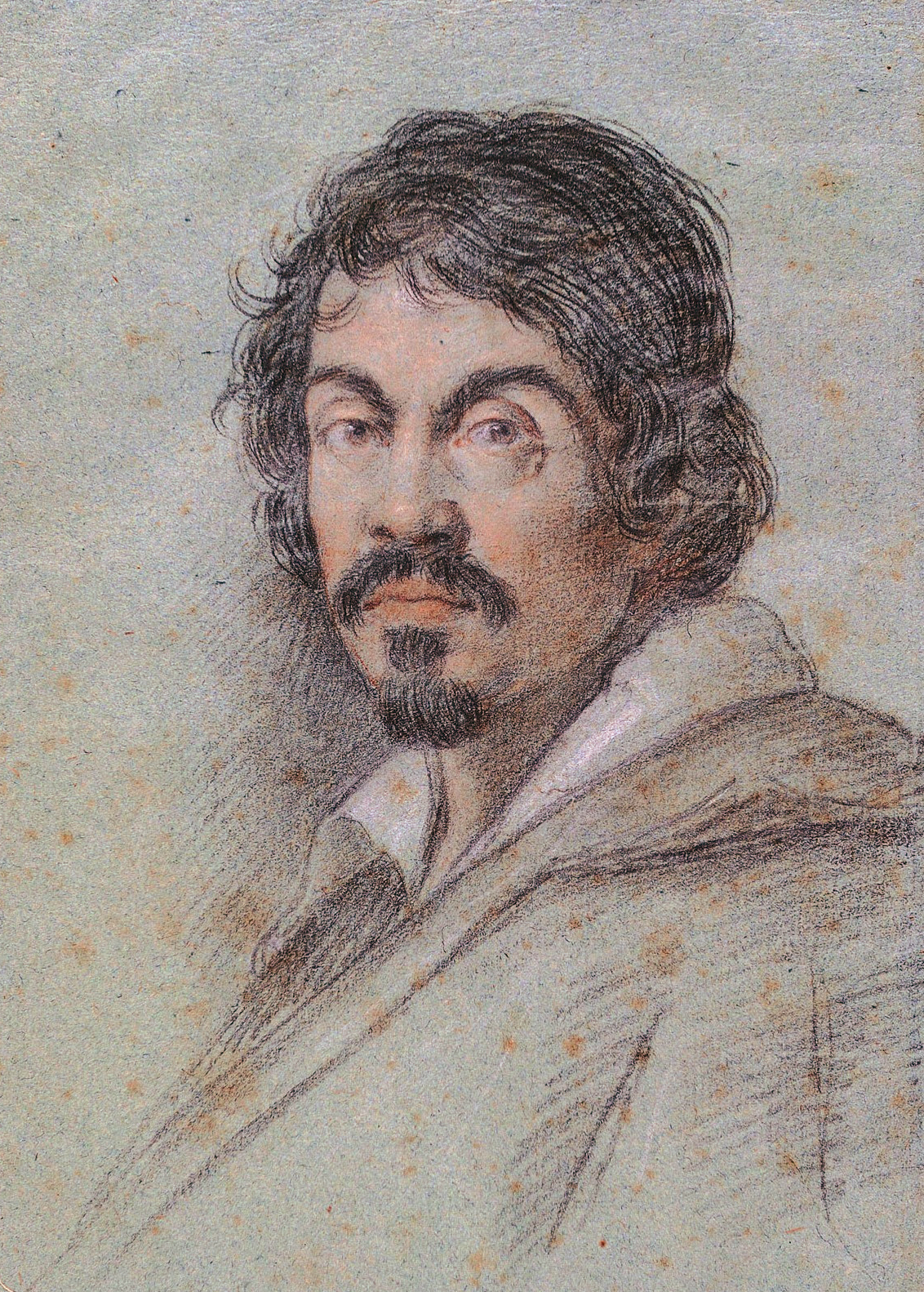
- Chalk portrait of Caravaggio by Ottavio Leoni, c. 1621
- Born: Michelangelo Merisi (or Amerighi) da Caravaggio; 29 September 1571; Milan, Duchy of Milan
- Died: 18 July 1610 (aged 38); Porto Ercole, State of the Presidi
- Education: Simone Peterzano
- Known for: Painting
- Notable work: The Beheading of St John the Baptist; The Calling of Saint Matthew; The Musicians; The Cardsharps
- Movement: Baroque
- Patrons: Cardinal Francesco Maria del Monte; Alof de Wignacourt

Michelangelo Merisi da Caravaggio (Note: /ˌkærəˈvædʒioʊ/ KARR-ə-VAJ-ee-oh, US: /-ˈvɑːdʒ(i)oʊ/ -VAH-j(ee-)oh, Italian: [mikeˈlandʒelo meˈriːzi da (k)karaˈvaddʒo].) (also Michele Angelo Merigi or Amerighi da Caravaggio; 29 September 1571 – 18 July 1610), known mononymously as Caravaggio, was an Italian painter active in Rome for a significant portion of his artistic life. He began his apprenticeship in Milan in 1584, and during the final four years of his life, he moved between Naples, Malta, and Sicily. His paintings have been characterized by art critics as combining a realistic observation of the human state, both physical and emotional, with a dramatic use of lighting, which had a formative influence on Baroque painting.

Caravaggio employed close physical observation with a dramatic use of chiaroscuro that came to be known as tenebrism. He made the technique a dominant stylistic element, transfixing subjects in bright shafts of light and darkening shadows. Caravaggio vividly expressed crucial moments and scenes, often featuring violent struggles, torture, and death. He worked rapidly with live models, preferring to forgo drawings and work directly on the canvas. His effect on the new Baroque style that emerged from Mannerism was profound. His influence can be seen directly or indirectly in the work of Peter Paul Rubens, Jusepe de Ribera, Gian Lorenzo Bernini, Velázquez and Rembrandt, as well as many lesser-known artists. Artists most deeply influenced by him were called the "Caravaggisti" (or "Caravagesques"), as well as tenebrists or tenebrosi ("shadowists").

Caravaggio trained as a painter in Milan before moving to Rome when he was in his twenties. He developed a considerable name as an artist and as a violent, touchy and provocative man. He killed Ranuccio Tomassoni in a brawl, which led to a death sentence for murder and forced him to flee to Naples. There he again established himself as one of the most prominent Italian painters of his generation. He travelled to Malta and on to Sicily in 1607 and pursued a papal pardon for his sentence. In 1609, he returned to Naples, where he was involved in a violent clash; his face was disfigured, and rumours of his death circulated. Questions about his mental state arose from his erratic and bizarre behavior. He died in 1610 under uncertain circumstances while on his way from Naples to Rome. Reports stated that he died of a fever, possibly due to wounds. Suggestions have been made that he was murdered or that he died of lead poisoning.

Caravaggio's innovations inspired Baroque painting, which often incorporated the drama of his chiaroscuro with a lesser degree of psychological disturbance. As style evolved and fashions changed, Caravaggio fell out of favor. In the 20th century, interest in his work was revived, and his importance to the development of Western art was reassessed. The 20th-century art historian André Berne-Joffroy stated: "What begins in the work of Caravaggio is, quite simply, modern painting."

== Biography ==
=== Early life (1571–1592) ===
Baptismal act of Caravaggio

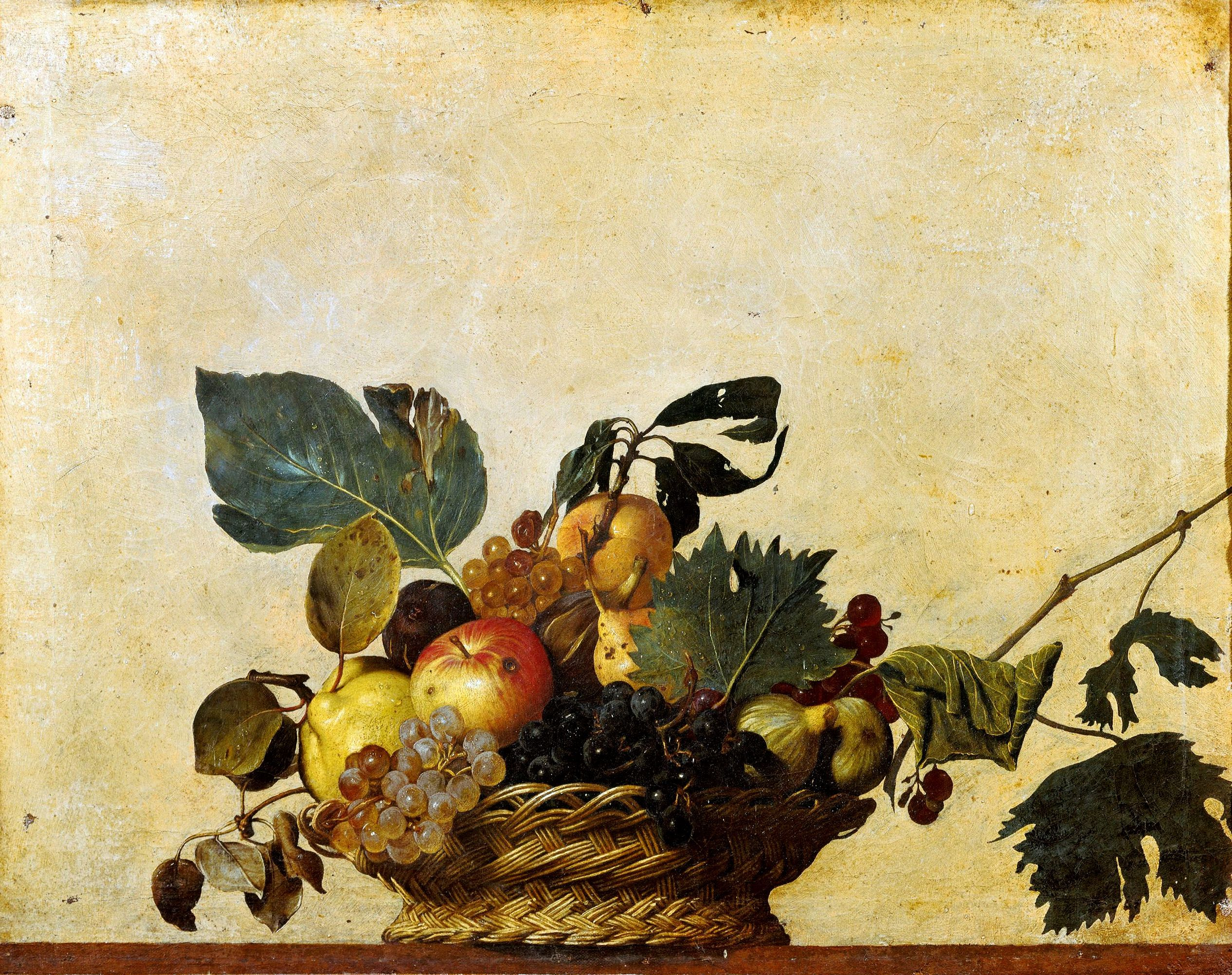
Basket of Fruit, c. 1595–1596, oil on canvas, Pinacoteca Ambrosiana, Milan

Caravaggio (Michelangelo Merisi or Amerighi) was born in Milan, where his father, Fermo (Fermo Merixio), was a household administrator and architect-decorator to the marquess of Caravaggio, a town 35 km (22 mi) to the east of Milan and south of Bergamo. It was previously assumed that he had been born in Caravaggio. In 1576 the family moved to Caravaggio to escape a plague that ravaged Milan, and Caravaggio's father and grandfather both died there on the same day in 1577. It is assumed that the artist grew up in Caravaggio, but his family kept up connections with the Sforzas and the powerful Colonna family, who were allied by marriage with the Sforzas and destined to play a major role later in Caravaggio's life.

Caravaggio's mother, Lucia Aratori raised her five children in poverty. She died in 1584, the same year he began his four-year apprenticeship to the Milanese painter Simone Peterzano, described in the contract of apprenticeship as a pupil of Titian. Caravaggio appears to have stayed in the Milan-Caravaggio area after his apprenticeship ended, but it is possible that he visited Venice and saw the works of Giorgione, whom Federico Zuccari later accused him of imitating, and Titian. He would also have become familiar with the art treasures of Milan, including Leonardo da Vinci's Last Supper, and with the regional Lombard art, a style that valued simplicity and attention to naturalistic detail and was closer to the naturalism of Germany than to the stylised formality and grandeur of Roman Mannerism. Graham-Dixon sees the influence of the popular images favored by the Counter-Reformation archbishop Charles Borromeo (who was later Canonised).

=== Beginnings in Rome (1592/95–1600) ===
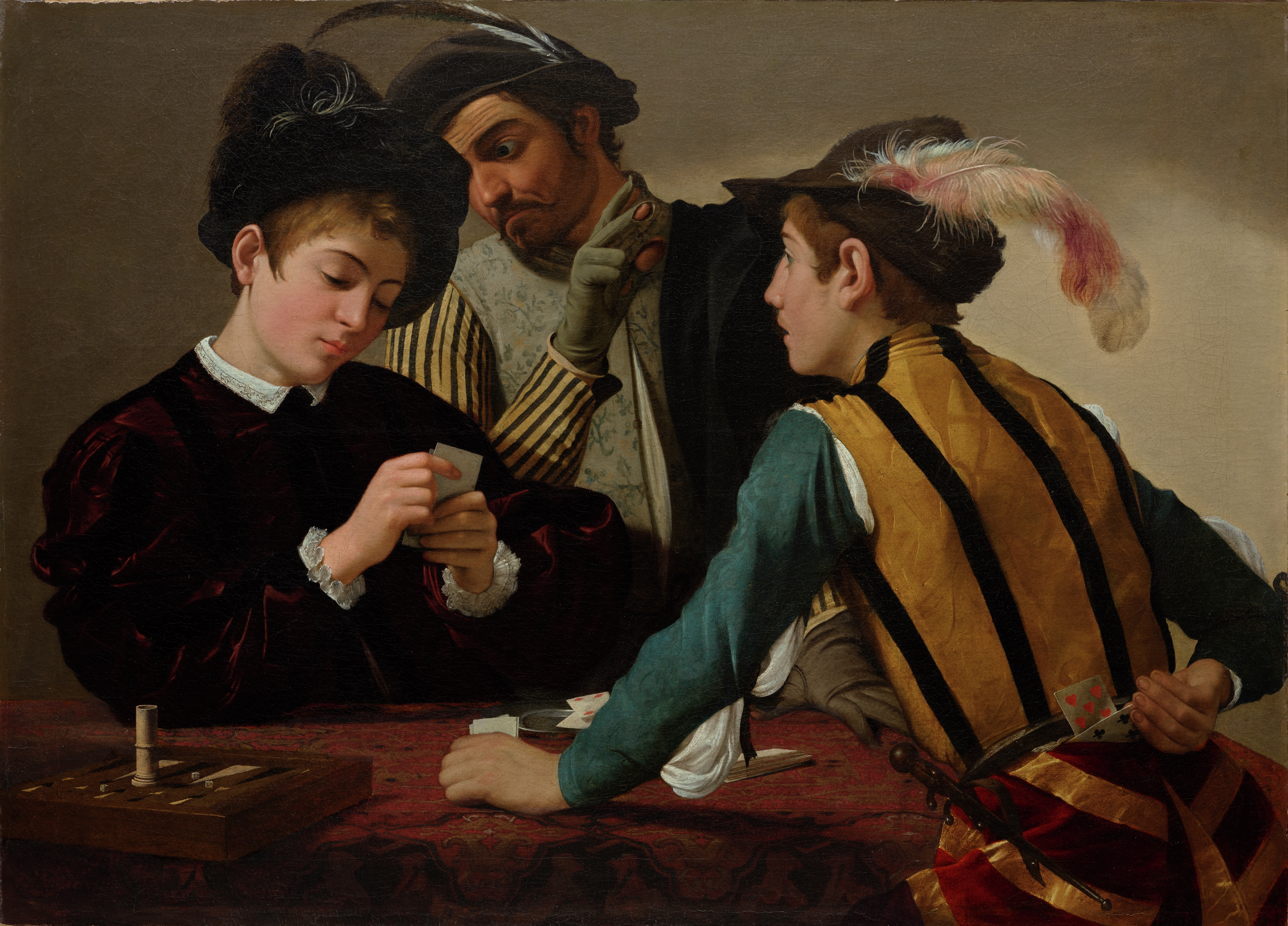
The Cardsharps, c. 1594, Oil on canvas, Kimbell Art Museum, Fort Worth

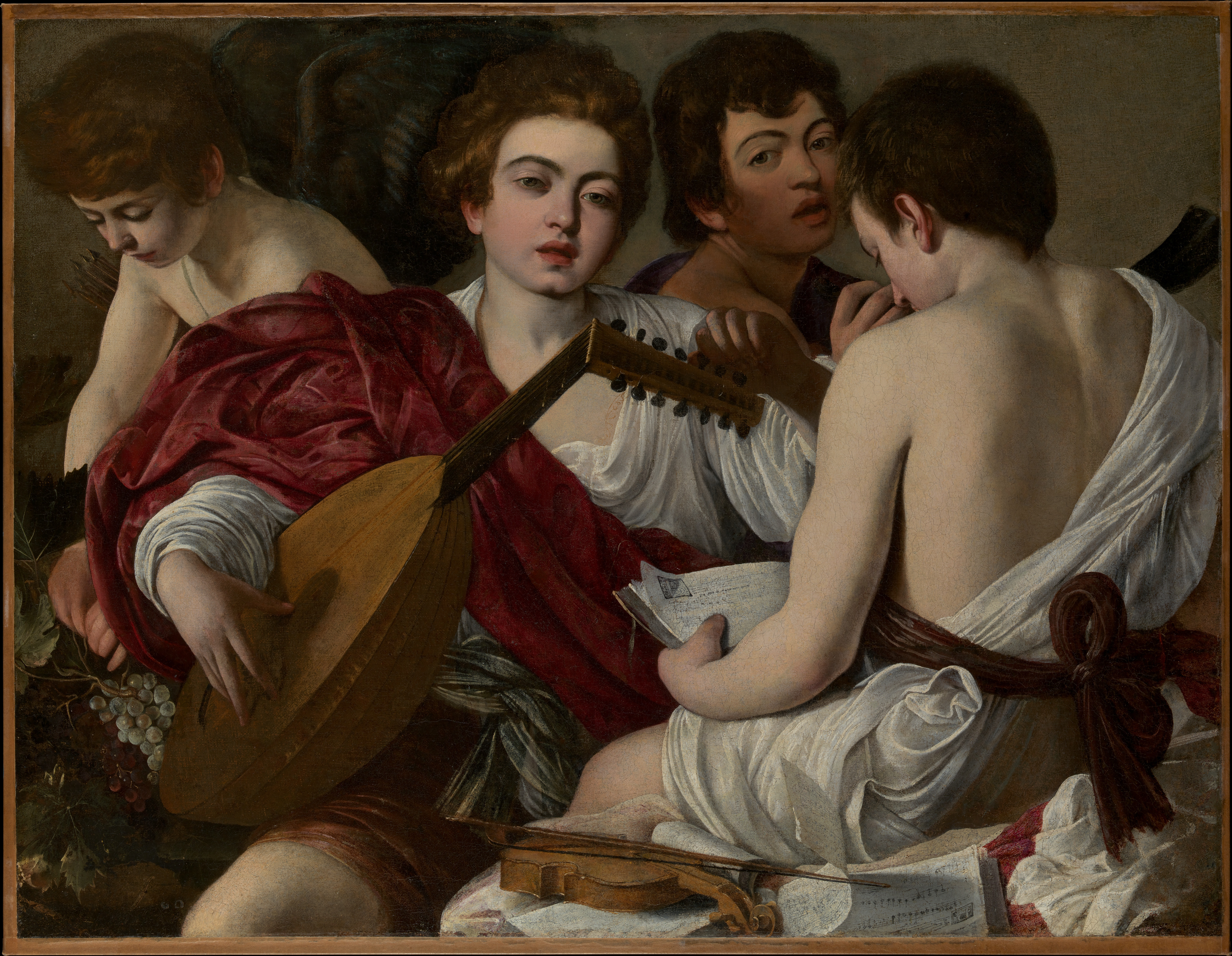
The Musicians, 1595–1596, Metropolitan Museum of Art, New York

Following his initial training under Simone Peterzano, in 1592, Caravaggio left Milan for Rome in flight after "certain quarrels" and the wounding of a police officer. The young artist arrived in Rome "naked and extremely needy... without fixed address and without provision... short of money." During this period, he stayed with the miserly Pandolfo Pucci, known as "monsignor Insalata". A few months later he was working for the highly successful Giuseppe Cesari, Pope Clement VIII's favourite artist, "painting flowers and fruit" and other minor elements in his factory-like workshop. It is hard to establish the chronology of Caravaggio's early years due to his changing of addresses frequently – around ten times between 1592 and 1595.

In Rome, there was a demand for paintings to fill the many huge new churches and palaces being built at the time. It was also a period when the Church was searching for a stylistic alternative to Mannerism in religious art that was tasked to counter the threat of Protestantism. Caravaggio's innovation was a radical naturalism that combined close physical observation with a dramatic, even theatrical, use of chiaroscuro known as tenebrism (the shift from light to dark with little intermediate value).

Caravaggio began working in Rome for Lorenzo Siciliano, a minor painter for whom he painted three heads a day, for very nominal pay, according Giovanni Bellori, a painter and an early biographer of Caravaggio.

Known works include the small Boy Peeling a Fruit (his earliest known painting). The next two works are from his time with Cesari: Boy with a Basket of Fruit, and Young Sick Bacchus, supposedly a self-portrait done during convalescence from a serious illness that ended his employment with Cesari. The title Sick Bacchus comes from Italian art historian Roberto Longhi. Whether the artwork references Caravaggio’s real life illness is up for question, though many scholars are convinced it is a self portrait. All three demonstrate the physical particularity for which Caravaggio was to become renowned: the fruit-basket-boy's produce has been analyzed by a professor of horticulture, who was able to identify individual cultivars right down to "...a large fig leaf with a prominent fungal scorch lesion resembling anthracnose (Glomerella cingulata)."

Caravaggio left Cesari, determined to make his own way after a heated argument. At this point he forged some extremely important friendships, with the painter Prospero Orsi, the architect Onorio Longhi, and the sixteen-year-old Sicilian artist Mario Minniti. Orsi, established in the profession, introduced him to influential collectors; Longhi, more balefully, introduced him to the world of Roman street brawls. Minniti served Caravaggio as a model and, years later, would be instrumental in helping him to obtain important commissions in Sicily. Minniti had fled Syracuse years prior, and he and Caravaggio allegedly dreamed together of rising to greater things. Minniti had a “moon-shaped” face and appeared in a number of Caravaggio’s early works. Ostensibly, the first archival reference to Caravaggio in a contemporary document from Rome is the listing of his name, with that of Prospero Orsi as his partner, as an 'assistant' in a procession in October 1594 in honour of St. Luke. The earliest informative account of his life in the city is a court transcript dated 11 July 1597, when Caravaggio and Prospero Orsi were witnesses to a crime near San Luigi de' Francesi.

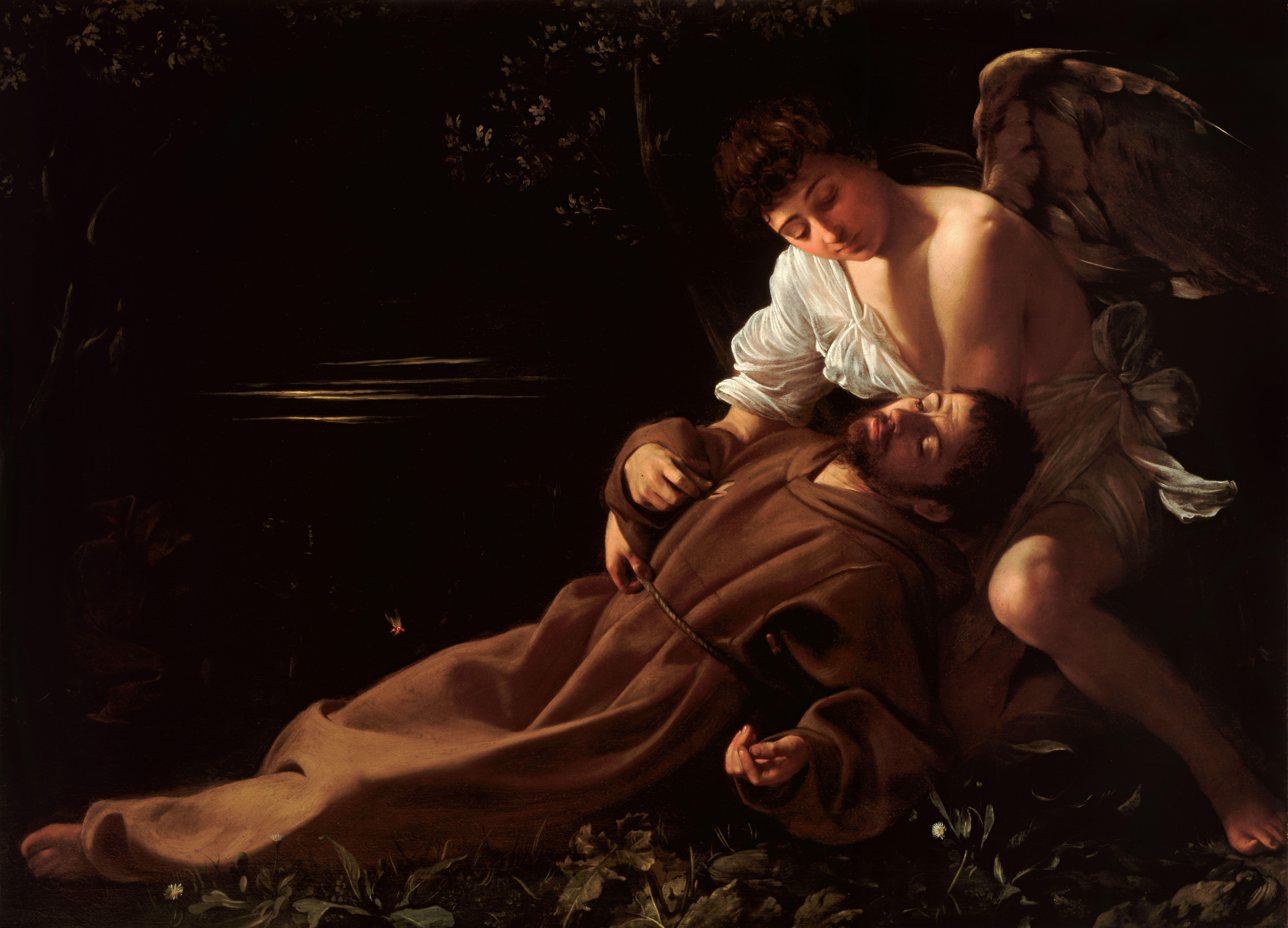
Saint Francis of Assisi in Ecstasy (c. 1595), Wadsworth Atheneum, Hartford

The Fortune Teller, his first composition with more than one figure, shows a boy, likely Minniti, having his palm read by a Romani girl, who is stealthily removing his ring as she strokes his hand. The theme was novel in Rome, and proved immensely influential over the next century and beyond. However, at the time, Caravaggio sold it for practically nothing. The Cardsharps—showing another naïve youth of privilege falling victim to card cheats—is even more psychologically complex and perhaps Caravaggio's first true masterpiece. Like The Fortune Teller, it was immensely popular, and over 50 copies survived.

The two paintings, which were displayed in Costantino Spata's shop, attracted the patronage of Cardinal Francesco Maria del Monte, one of the leading connoisseurs in Rome. He purchased them both. According to Graham-Dixon, "the pictures allegorically enact Caravaggio’s own stratagem in painting them, namely that of ensnaring a wealthy man." For del Monte and his wealthy art-loving circle, Caravaggio executed a number of intimate chamber-pieces—The Musicians, The Lute Player, a tipsy Bacchus, and an allegorical but realistic Boy Bitten by a Lizard—featuring Minniti and other adolescent models.

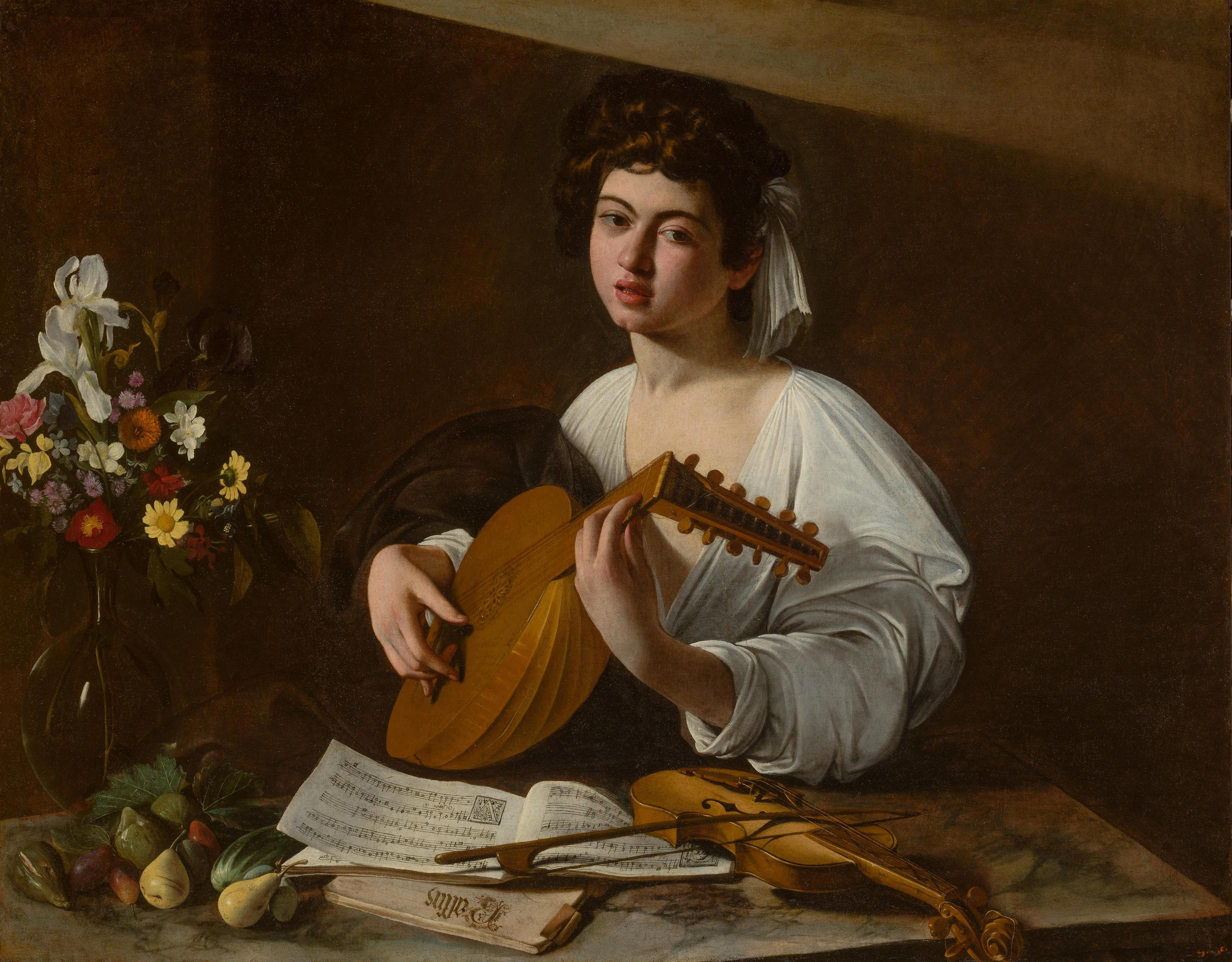
The Lute Player (Hermitage version), c. 1600, Hermitage Museum, Saint Petersburg (commissioned by Francesco Maria del Monte)

Caravaggio's first paintings on religious themes returned to realism, from which emerged a remarkable spirituality. The first of these religious paintings was the Penitent Magdalene, showing Mary Magdalene at the moment when she has turned from her life as a courtesan and sits weeping on the floor, her jewels scattered around her. "It seemed not a religious painting at all ... a girl sitting on a low wooden stool drying her hair ... Where was the repentance ... suffering ... promise of salvation?" According to Catherine Puglisi, the figure of Mary Magdalene "shares with the genre pictures a close observation of the models." It is a "portrait-like image," because Caravaggio is "interested in neither the idealized female nude, the imagined wilderness, nor standard Christian symbols of death and salvation."

It was understated, in the Lombard manner, not histrionic in the Roman manner of the time. It was followed by others in the same style: Saint Catherine; Martha and Mary Magdalene; Judith Beheading Holofernes; Sacrifice of Isaac; Saint Francis of Assisi in Ecstasy; and Rest on the Flight into Egypt. These works, while viewed by a comparatively limited circle, increased Caravaggio's fame with both connoisseurs and his fellow artists. But a true reputation would depend on public commissions, for which it was necessary to look to the Church.

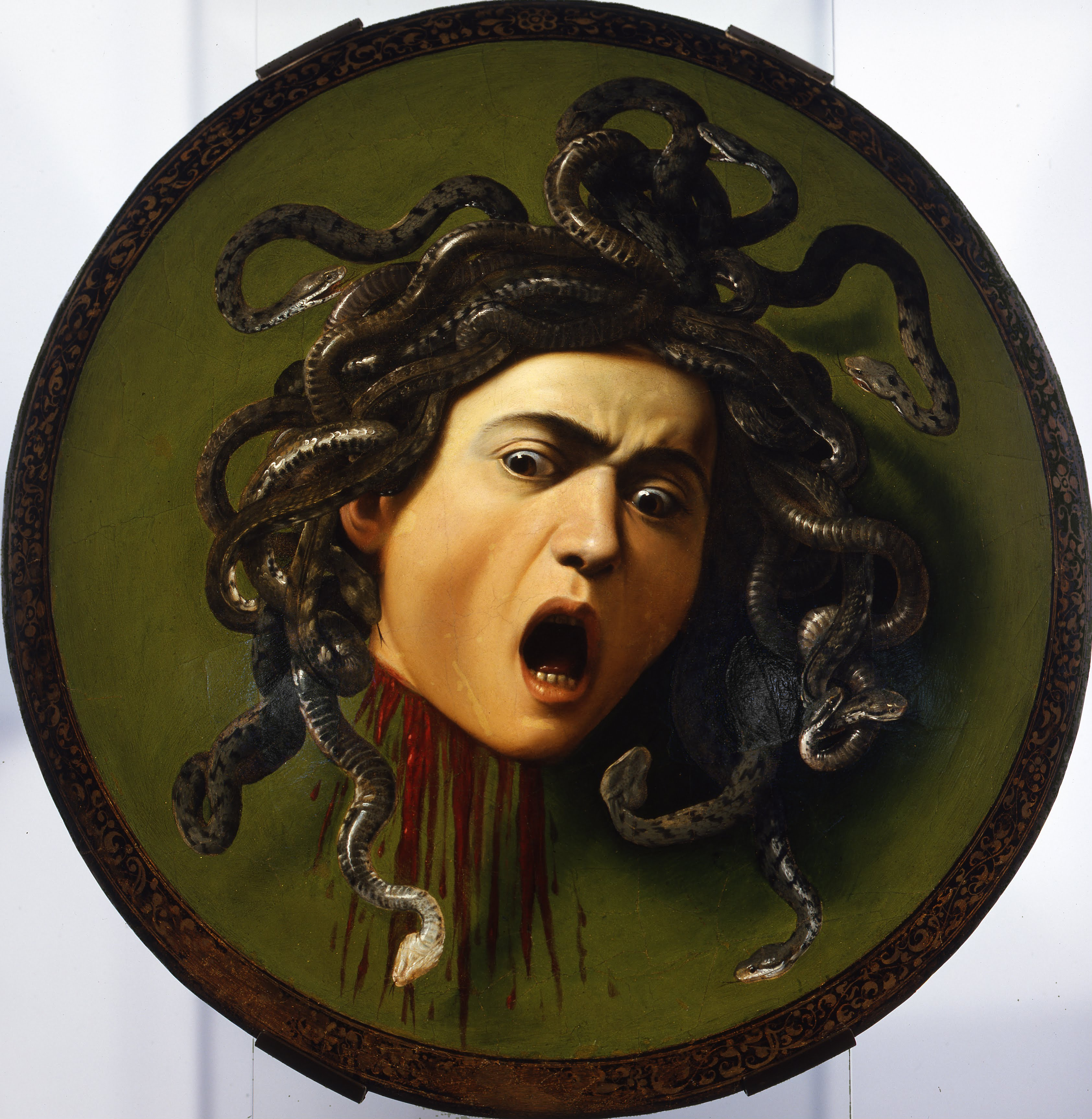
Medusa, c. 1597, Uffizi, Florence

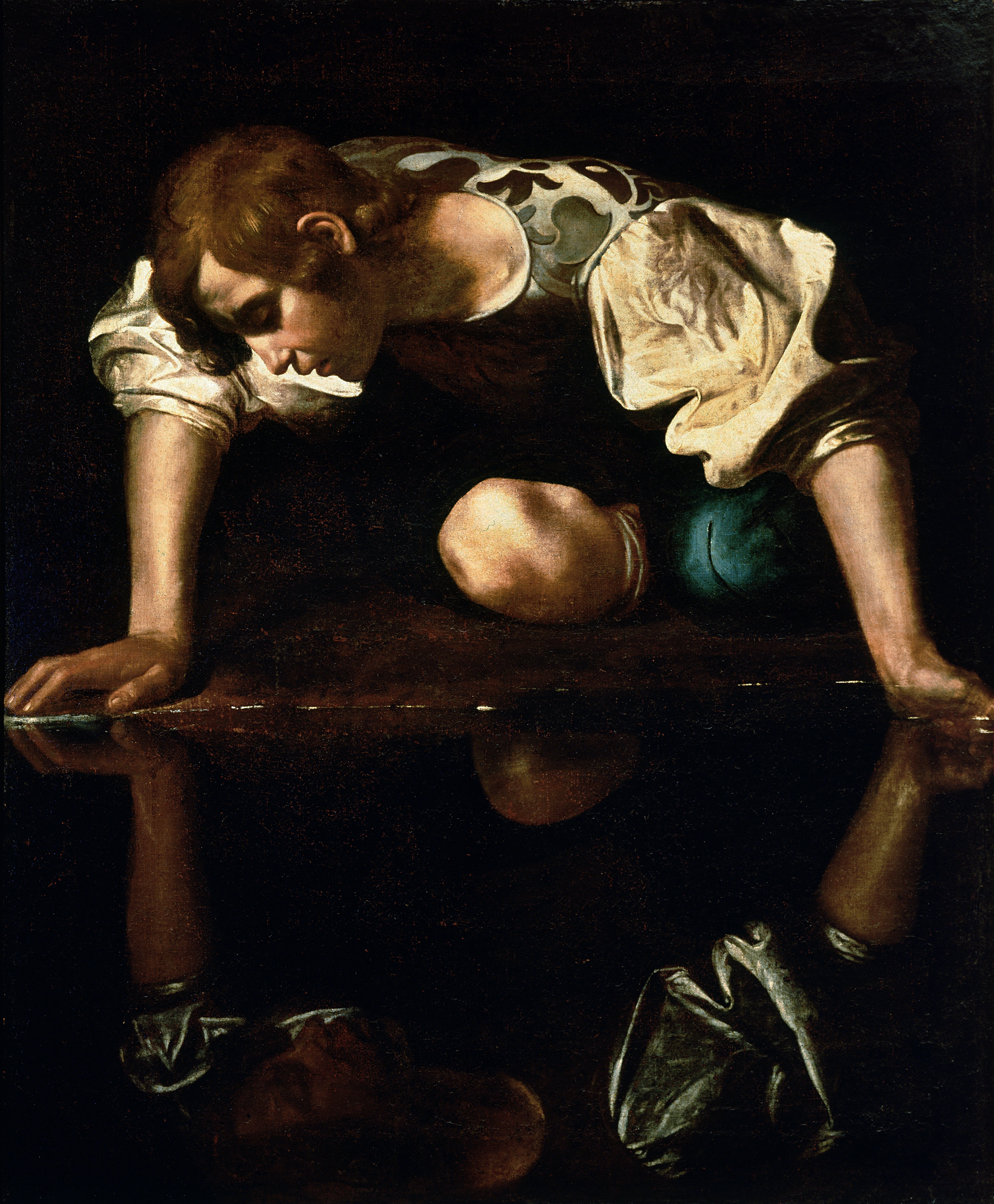
Narcissus at the Source, 1597–1599, Galleria Nazionale d'Arte Antica, Rome

Already evident was the intense realism or naturalism for which Caravaggio is now famous. Caravaggio invented realism in the sense that artworks should involve the viewer in an “emotional, visceral, and personal way”. He preferred to paint his subjects as the eye sees them, with all their natural flaws and defects, instead of as idealised creations. This allowed a full display of his virtuosic talents. This shift from accepted standard practice and the classical idealism of Michelangelo was very controversial at the time. Caravaggio also dispensed with the lengthy preparations for a painting that were traditional in central Italy at the time. Instead, he preferred the Venetian practice of working in oils directly from the subject—half-length figures and still life. Supper at Emmaus, from c. 1600–1601, is a characteristic work of this period demonstrating his virtuoso talent.

=== "Most famous painter in Rome" (1600–1606) ===
In 1599, presumably through the influence of del Monte, Caravaggio was contracted to decorate the Contarelli Chapel in the church of San Luigi dei Francesi. The two works making up the commission, The Martyrdom of Saint Matthew and The Calling of Saint Matthew, delivered in 1600, were an immediate sensation. Thereafter he never lacked commissions or patrons.

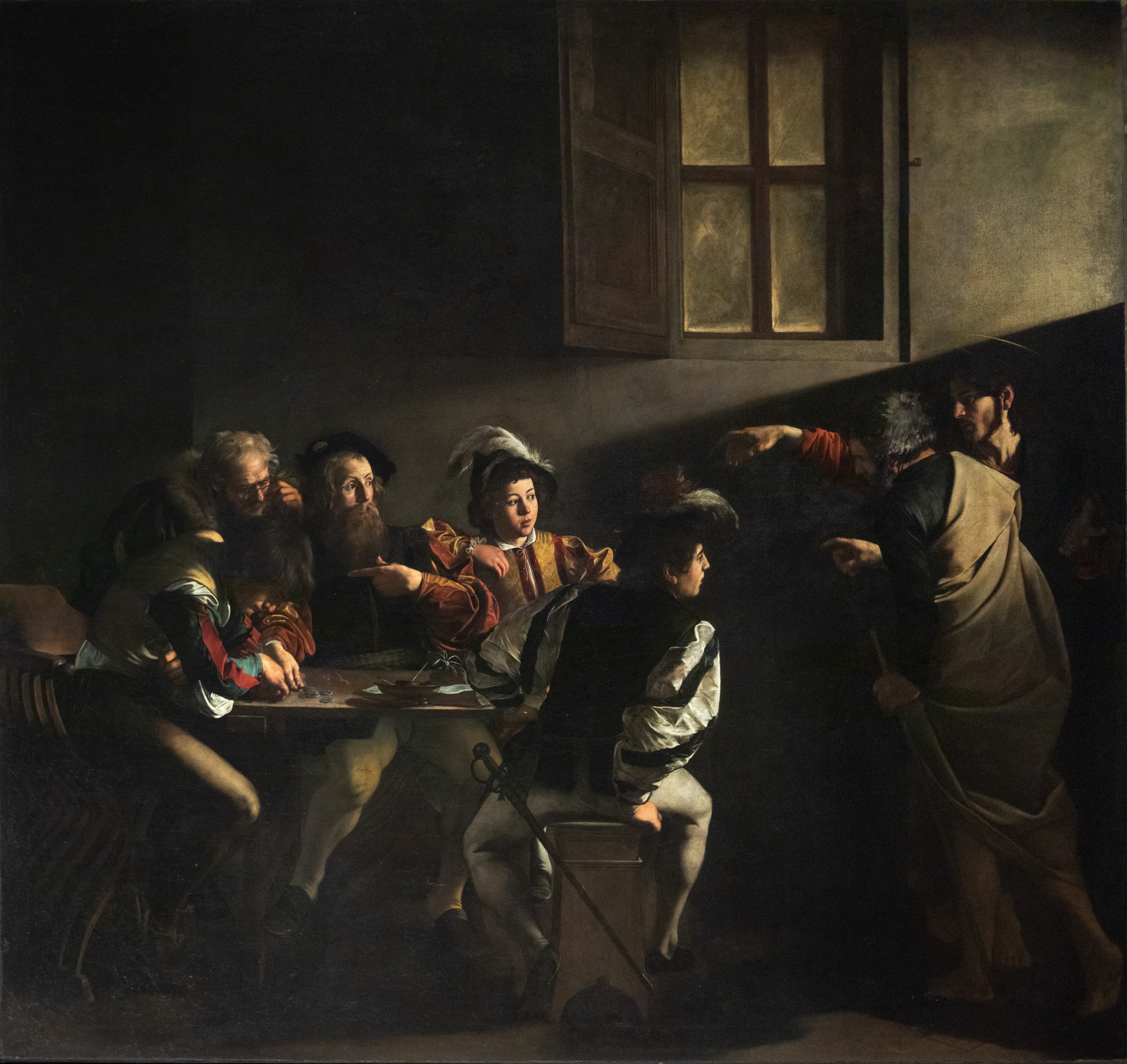
The Calling of Saint Matthew (1599–1600), Contarelli Chapel, San Luigi dei Francesi, Rome. Without recourse to flying angels, parting clouds or other artifice, Caravaggio portrays the instant conversion of St. Matthew, the moment on which his destiny will turn, by means of a beam of light and the pointing finger of Jesus.

Caravaggio's tenebrism (a heightened chiaroscuro) brought high drama to his subjects, while his acutely observed realism brought a new level of emotional intensity. Opinion among his artist peers was polarized. Some denounced him for various perceived failings, notably his insistence on painting from life, without drawings, but for the most part he was hailed as a great artistic visionary: "The painters then in Rome were greatly taken by this novelty, and the young ones particularly gathered around him, praised him as the unique imitator of nature, and looked on his work as miracles."

Caravaggio went on to secure a string of prestigious commissions for religious works featuring violent struggles, grotesque decapitations, torture, and death. Most notable and technically masterful among them were The Incredulity of Saint Thomas (circa 1601) and The Taking of Christ (circa 1602) the latter only rediscovered by Sergio Benedetti in the 1990s in Dublin after remaining unrecognized for two centuries. For the most part, each new painting increased his fame, but a few were rejected by the various bodies for whom they were intended, at least in their original forms, and had to be re-painted or find new buyers. While Caravaggio's dramatic intensity was appreciated, his realism was seen by some as unacceptably vulgar. Another reason for rejection was when Caravaggio's images did not correspond to religious texts.

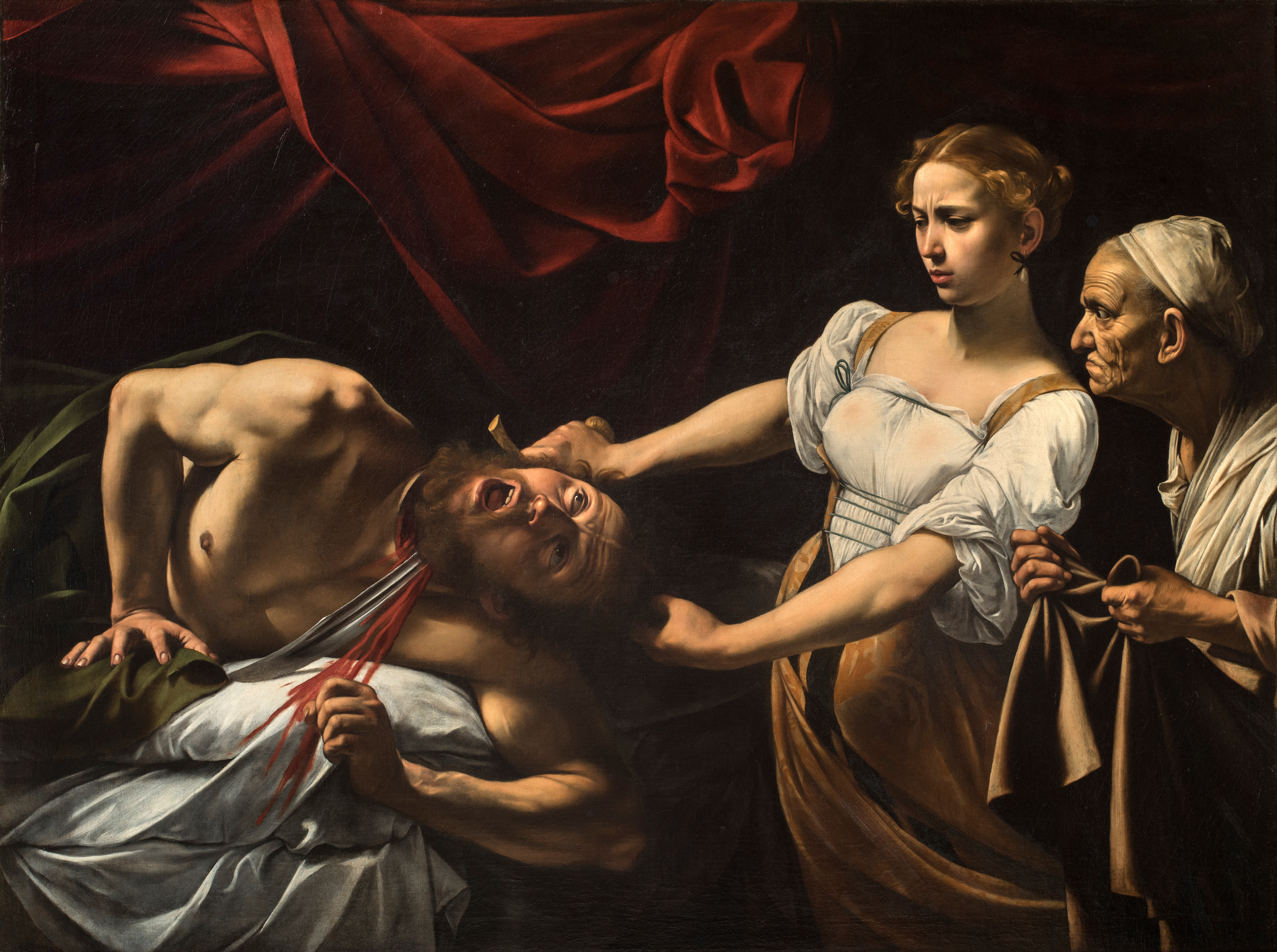
Judith Beheading Holofernes, 1599–1602, Galleria Nazionale d'Arte Antica, Rome

His first version of Saint Matthew and the Angel, featuring the saint as a bald peasant with dirty legs attended by a lightly clad over-familiar boy-angel, was rejected and a second version had to be painted as The Inspiration of Saint Matthew. Similarly, The Conversion of Saint Paul was rejected, and while another version of the same subject, the Conversion on the Way to Damascus, was accepted, it featured the saint's horse's haunches far more prominently than the saint himself, prompting this exchange between the artist and an exasperated official of Santa Maria del Popolo: "Why have you put a horse in the middle, and Saint Paul on the ground?" "Because!" "Is the horse God?" "No, but he stands in God's light!"

The aristocratic collector Ciriaco Mattei, brother of Cardinal Girolamo Mattei, who was friends with Cardinal Francesco Maria Bourbon Del Monte, gave The Supper at Emmaus to the city palace he shared with his brother, 1601 (National Gallery, London), The Incredulity of Saint Thomas, c. 1601, "Ecclesiastical Version" (Private Collection, Florence), The Incredulity of Saint Thomas c. 1601, 1601 "Secular Version" (Sanssouci Palace, Potsdam), John the Baptist with the Ram, 1602 (Capitoline Museums, Rome) and The Taking of Christ, 1602 (National Gallery of Ireland, Dublin) Caravaggio commissioned.

One of the many versions of The Taking of Christ, which was looted from the Odessa Museum in 2008 and recovered in 2010, is believed by some experts to be a contemporary copy.

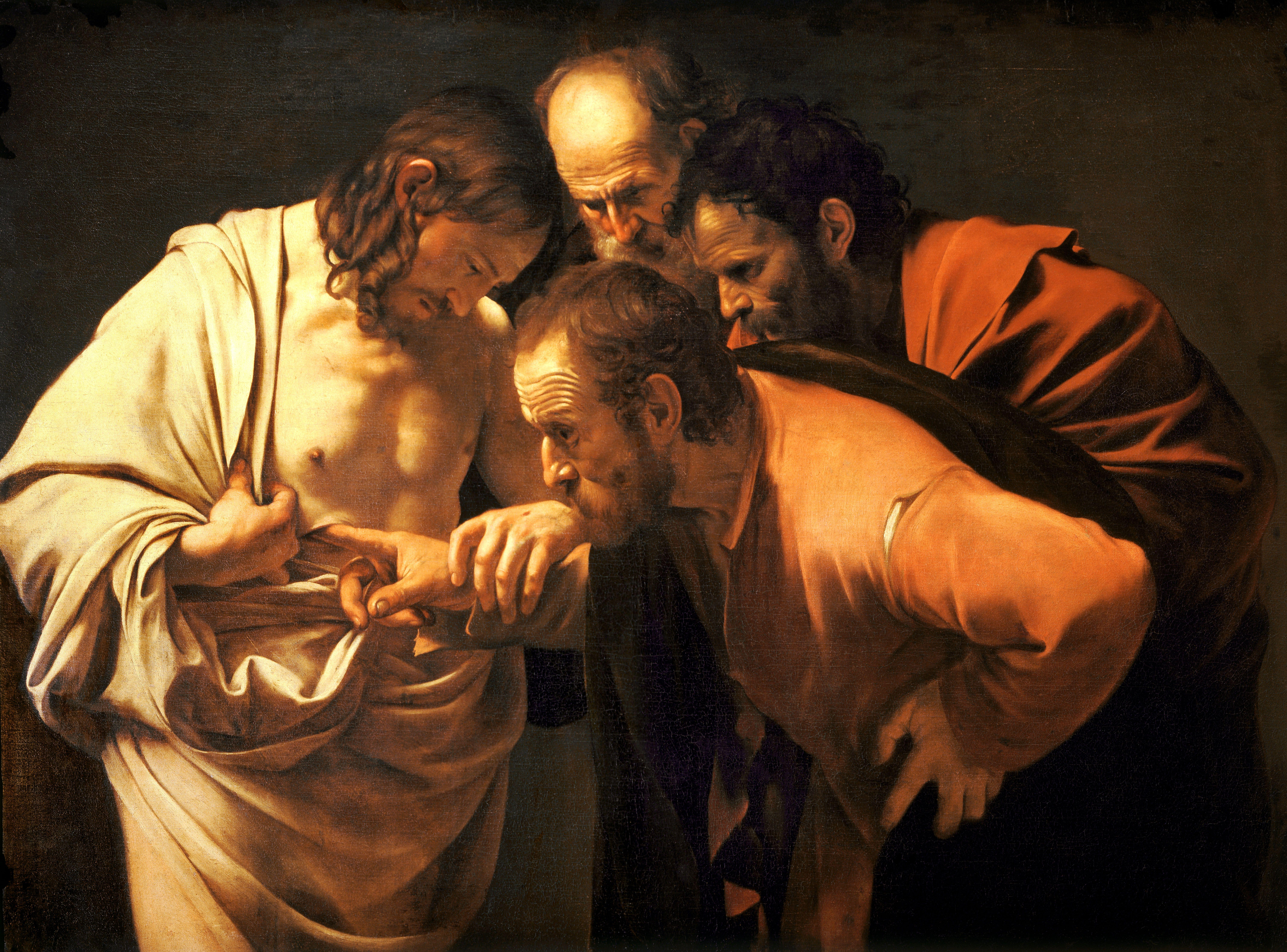
The Incredulity of Saint Thomas

The Incredulity of Saint Thomas is one of the most famous paintings by Caravaggio, circa 1601–1602. It entered the Prussian Royal Collection, survived the Second World War unscathed, and can be viewed in the Sanssouci Picture Gallery, Potsdam.

The painting depicts the episode that led to the term "Doubting Thomas"—in art history formally known as "The Incredulity of Saint Thomas"—which has been frequently depicted and used to make various theological statements in Christian art since at least the 5th century. According to the Gospel of John, Thomas the Apostle missed one of Jesus' appearances to the apostles after his resurrection and said, "Unless I see the marks of the nails in his hands, and put my finger where the nails were, and put my hand into his side, I will not believe it." A week later, Jesus appeared and told Thomas to touch him and stop doubting. Then Jesus said, "Because you have seen me, you have believed; blessed are those who have not seen and yet have believed."

The painting shows in a demonstrative gesture how the doubting apostle puts his finger into Christ's side wound, the latter guiding his hand. The unbeliever is depicted like a peasant, dressed in a robe torn at the shoulder and with dirt under his fingernails. The composition of the picture is designed in such a way that the viewer is directly involved in the event and also feels its intensity.

Death of the Virgin, 1601–1606, Louvre, Paris

Other works included Entombment, the Madonna di Loreto ("Madonna of the Pilgrims"), the Grooms' Madonna, and Death of the Virgin. The history of these last two paintings illustrates the reception given to some of Caravaggio's art and the times in which he lived. The Grooms' Madonna, also known as Madonna dei palafrenieri, painted for a small altar in Saint Peter's Basilica in Rome, remained there for just two days and was then removed. A cardinal's secretary wrote: "In this painting, there are but vulgarity, sacrilege, impiousness and disgust...One would say it is a work made by a painter that can paint well, but of a dark spirit, and who has been for a lot of time far from God, from His adoration, and from any good thought..."

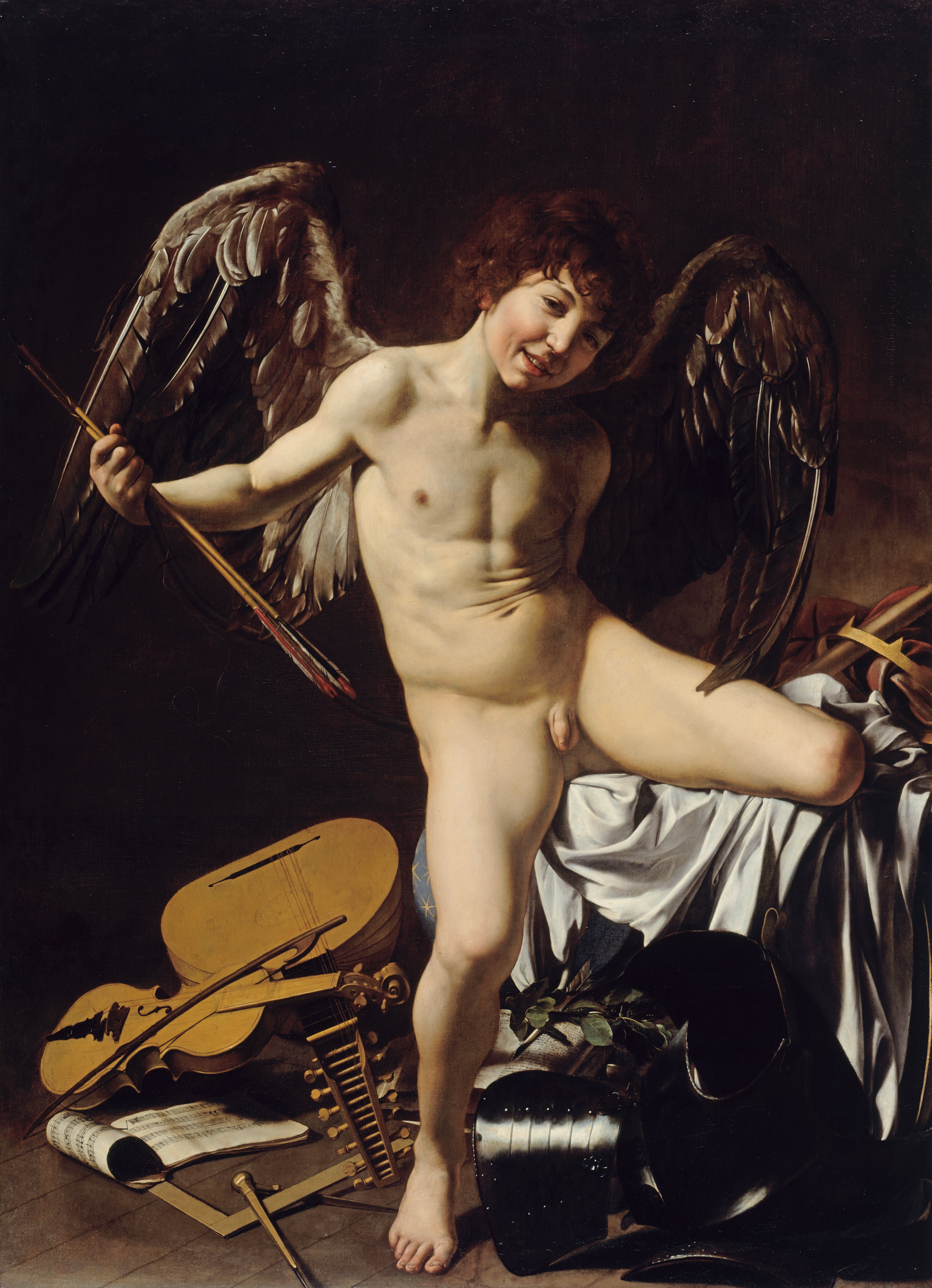
Amor Vincit Omnia, 1601–1602, Gemäldegalerie, Berlin. Caravaggio shows Cupid prevailing over all human endeavors: war, music, science, government.

Death of the Virgin, commissioned in 1601 by a wealthy jurist for his private chapel in the new Carmelite church of Santa Maria della Scala, was rejected by the Carmelites in 1606. Caravaggio's contemporary Giulio Mancini records that it was rejected because Caravaggio had used a well-known prostitute as his model for the Virgin. Giovanni Baglione, another contemporary, tells that it was due to Mary's bare legs—a matter of decorum in either case. Caravaggio scholar John Gash suggests that the problem for the Carmelites may have been theological rather than aesthetic, in that Caravaggio's version fails to assert the doctrine of the Assumption of Mary, the idea that the Mother of God did not die in any ordinary sense but was assumed into Heaven. The replacement altarpiece commissioned (from one of Caravaggio's most able followers, Carlo Saraceni), showed the Virgin not dead, as Caravaggio had painted her, but seated and dying; and even this was rejected, and replaced with a work showing the Virgin not dying, but ascending into Heaven with choirs of angels. In any case, the rejection did not mean that Caravaggio or his paintings were out of favour. Death of the Virgin was no sooner taken out of the church than it was purchased by the Duke of Mantua, on the advice of Rubens, and later acquired by Charles I of England before entering the French royal collection in 1671.

One secular piece from these years is Amor Vincit Omnia, in English also called Amor Victorious, painted in 1602 for Vincenzo Giustiniani, a member of del Monte's circle. The model was named in a memoir of the early 17th century as "Cecco", the diminutive for Francesco. He is possibly Francesco Boneri, identified with an artist active in the period 1610–1625 and known as Cecco del Caravaggio ('Caravaggio's Cecco'), carrying a bow and arrows and trampling symbols of the warlike and peaceful arts and sciences underfoot. He is unclothed, and it is difficult to accept this grinning urchin as the Roman god Cupid—as difficult as it was to accept Caravaggio's other semi-clad adolescents as the various angels he painted in his canvases, wearing much the same stage-prop wings. The point, however, is the intense yet ambiguous reality of the work: it is simultaneously Cupid and Cecco, as Caravaggio's Virgins were simultaneously the Mother of Christ and the Roman courtesans who modeled for them.

=== Legal problems and flight from Rome (1606) ===
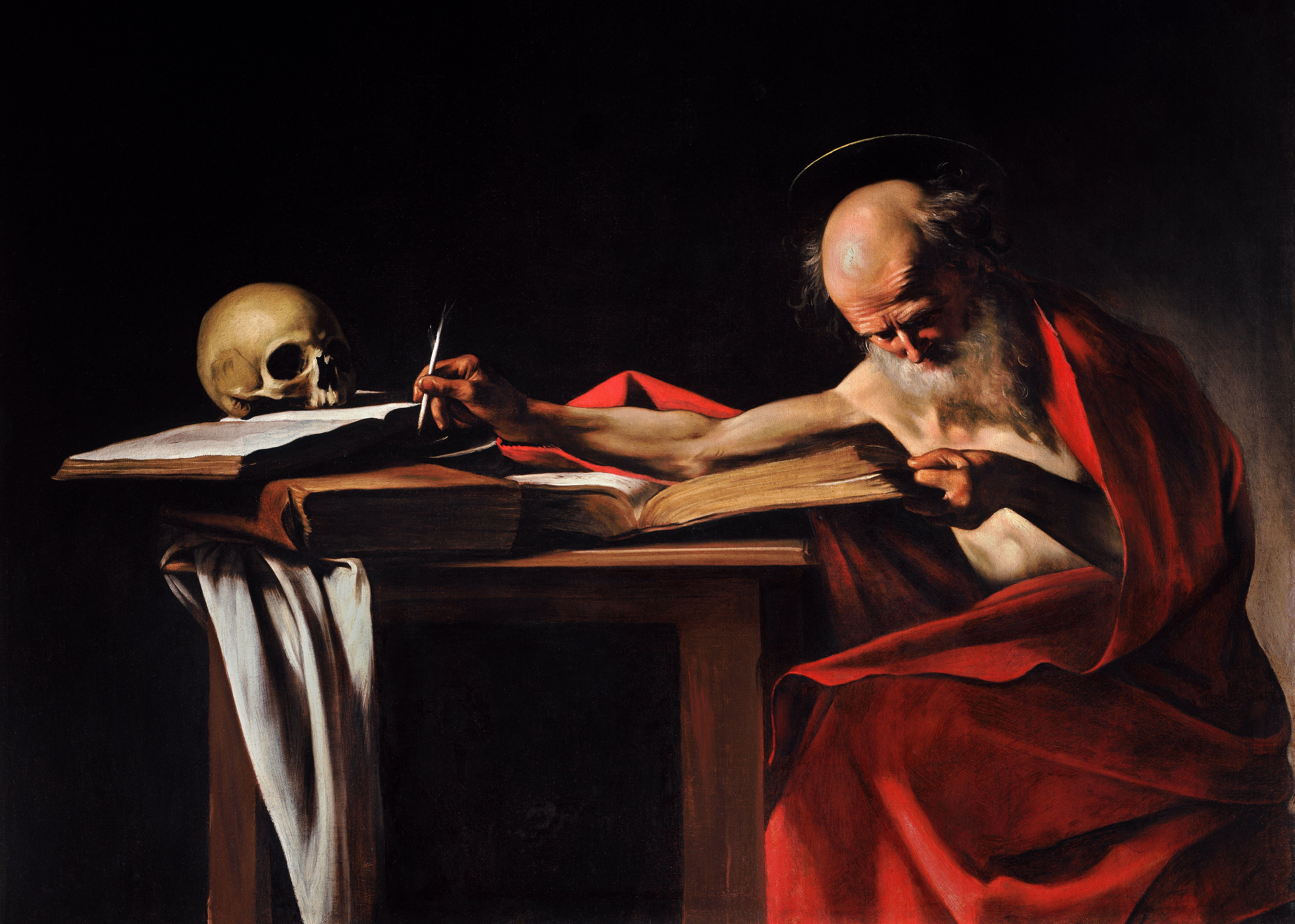
Saint Jerome Writing, c. 1605–1606, Galleria Borghese, Rome

Caravaggio led a tumultuous life. He was notorious for brawling, even in a time and place when such behavior was commonplace, and the transcripts of his police records and trial proceedings fill many pages.

Bellori claims that around 1590–1592, Caravaggio, already well known for brawling with gangs of young men, committed a murder which forced him to flee from Milan, first to Venice and then to Rome.

On 28 November 1600, while living at the Palazzo Madama with his patron Cardinal Del Monte, Caravaggio beat nobleman Girolamo Stampa da Montepulciano, a guest of the cardinal, with a club, resulting in an official complaint to the police. Episodes of brawling, violence, and tumult grew more and more frequent. Caravaggio was often arrested and jailed at Tor di Nona.

After his release from jail in 1601, Caravaggio returned to paint first The Taking of Christ and then Amor Vincit Omnia. In 1603, he was arrested again, this time for the defamation of another painter, Giovanni Baglione, who sued Caravaggio and his followers Orazio Gentileschi and Onorio Longhi for writing offensive poems about him. The French ambassador intervened, and Caravaggio was transferred to house arrest after a month in jail in Tor di Nona.

Between May and October 1604, Caravaggio was arrested several times for possession of illegal weapons and for insulting the city guards. He was also sued by a tavern waiter for having thrown a plate of artichokes in his face.

An early published notice on Caravaggio, dating from 1604 and describing his lifestyle three years previously, recounts that "after a fortnight's work he will swagger about for a month or two with a sword at his side and a servant following him, from one ball-court to the next, ever ready to engage in a fight or an argument, so that it is most awkward to get along with him."

In 1605, Caravaggio was forced to flee to Genoa for three weeks after seriously injuring Mariano Pasqualone di Accumoli, a notary, in a dispute over Lena, Caravaggio's model and lover. The notary reported having been attacked on 29 July with a sword, causing a severe head injury. Caravaggio's patrons intervened and managed to cover up the incident.

Upon his return to Rome, Caravaggio was sued by his landlady Prudenzia Bruni for not having paid his rent. Out of spite, Caravaggio threw rocks through her window at night and was sued again.

In November, Caravaggio was hospitalized for an injury which he claimed he had caused himself by falling on his own sword.

On 29 May 1606, Caravaggio killed a young man, possibly unintentionally, resulting in him fleeing Rome with a death sentence hanging over him. Ranuccio Tomassoni was a gangster from a wealthy family. The two had argued many times, often ending in blows. The circumstances are unclear, whether a brawl or a duel with swords at Campo Marzio, but the killing may have been unintentional.

Many rumours circulated at the time as to the cause of the fight. Several contemporary avvisi referred to a quarrel over a gambling debt and a pallacorda game, a sort of tennis, and this explanation has become established in the popular imagination. Other rumours, however, claimed that the duel stemmed from jealousy over Fillide Melandroni, a well-known Roman prostitute who had modeled for him in several important paintings; Tomassoni was her pimp. According to such rumours, Caravaggio castrated Tomassoni with his sword before deliberately killing him, with other versions claiming that Tomassoni's death had been caused accidentally during the castration. The duel may have had a political dimension, as Tomassoni's family was notoriously pro-Spanish, whereas Caravaggio was a client of the French ambassador.

Caravaggio's patrons had hitherto been able to shield him from any serious consequences of his frequent duels and brawling, but Tomassoni's wealthy family was outraged by his death and demanded justice. Caravaggio's patrons were unable to protect him. Caravaggio was sentenced to beheading for murder, and an open bounty was decreed, enabling anyone who recognized him to carry out the sentence legally. Caravaggio's paintings began, obsessively, to depict severed heads, often his own, at this time.

Modern accounts are to be found in Peter Robb's M and Helen Langdon's Caravaggio: A Life. A theory relating the death to Renaissance notions of honour and symbolic wounding has been advanced by art historian Andrew Graham-Dixon. Whatever the details, the matter was serious enough that Caravaggio was forced to flee Rome. He moved just south of the city, then to Naples, Malta, and Sicily.

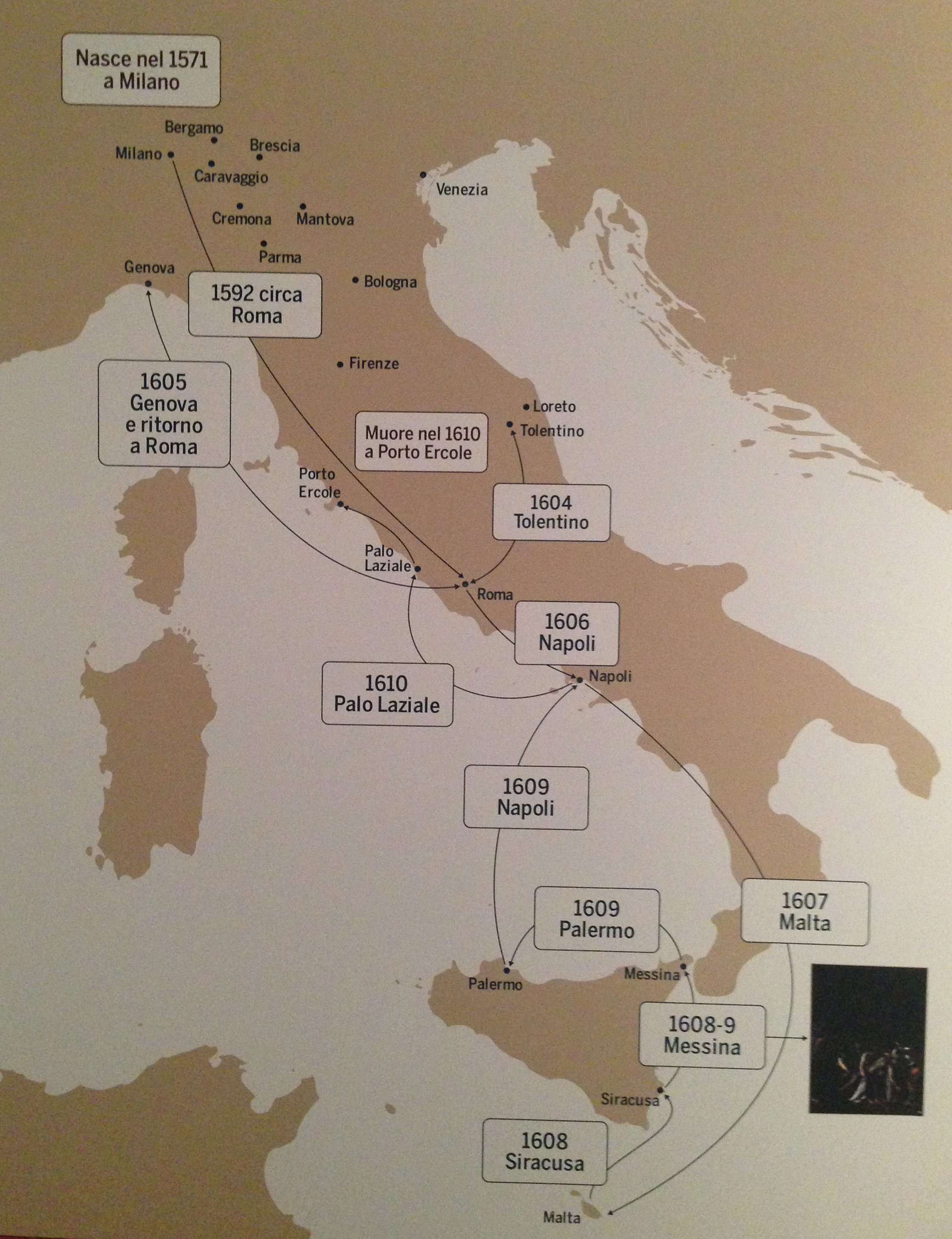
Map of Caravaggio's travels

=== Exile and death (1606–1610) ===
==== Naples ====
Following the death of Tomassoni, Caravaggio fled first to the estates of the Colonna family south of Rome and then on to Naples, where Costanza Colonna Sforza, widow of Francesco Sforza, in whose husband's household Caravaggio's father had held a position, maintained a palace. In Naples, outside the jurisdiction of the Roman authorities and protected by the Colonna family, the most famous painter in Rome became the most famous in Naples.

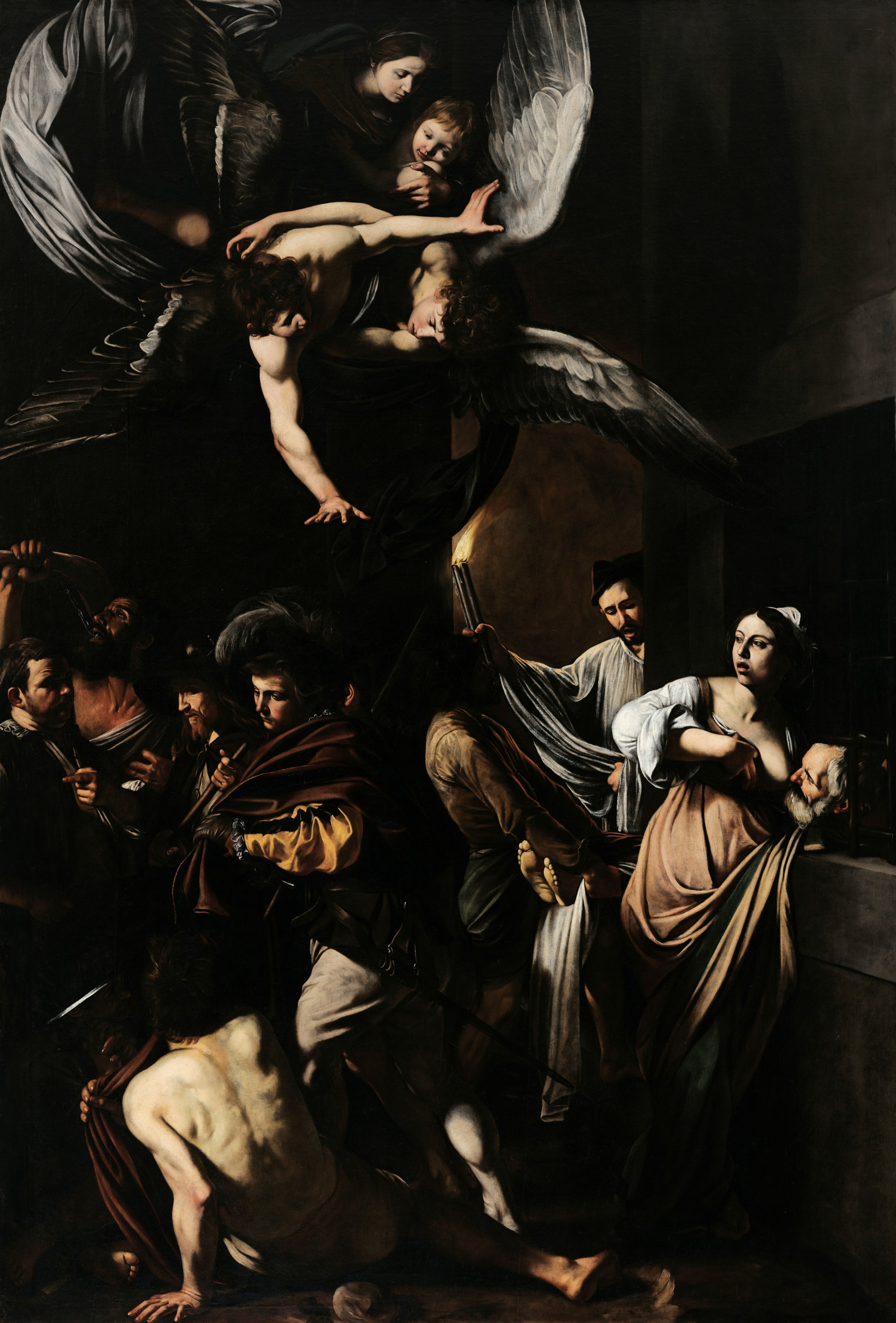
The Seven Works of Mercy, 1606–1607, Pio Monte della Misericordia, Naples

His connections with the Colonnas led to a stream of important church commissions, including the Madonna of the Rosary, and The Seven Works of Mercy. The Seven Works of Mercy depicts the seven corporal works of mercy as a set of compassionate acts concerning the material needs of others. The painting was made for and is still housed in the church of Pio Monte della Misericordia in Naples. Caravaggio combined all seven works of mercy in one composition, which became the church's altarpiece. Alessandro Giardino has also established the connection between the iconography of "The Seven Works of Mercy" and the cultural, scientific and philosophical circles of the painting's commissioners.

==== Malta ====
Despite his success in Naples, after only a few months in the city Caravaggio left for Hospitaller Malta, the headquarters of the Knights of Malta. Fabrizio Sforza Colonna, Costanza's son, was a Knight of Malta and general of the Order's galleys. He appears to have facilitated Caravaggio's arrival on the island in 1607 (and his escape the next year). Caravaggio presumably hoped that the patronage of Alof de Wignacourt, Grand Master of the Knights of Saint John, could help him secure a pardon for Tomassoni's death. Wignacourt was so impressed at having the artist as official painter to the Order that he inducted him as a Knight, and the early biographer Bellori records that the artist was well pleased with his success. Wignacourt reportedly gifted some slaves to Caravaggio in recognition for his services.

The Beheading of Saint John (1608) by Caravaggio (St John's Co-Cathedral, Valletta, Malta)

Major works from his Malta period include the Beheading of Saint John the Baptist, his largest ever work, and the only painting to which he put his signature, Saint Jerome Writing (both housed in St John's Co-Cathedral, Valletta, Malta) and a Portrait of Alof de Wignacourt and his Page, as well as portraits of other leading Knights. According to Andrea Pomella, The Beheading of Saint John the Baptist is widely considered "one of the most important works in Western painting." Completed in 1608, the painting had been commissioned by the Knights of Malta as an altarpiece and measuring 370 by 520 centimetres (145 in × 205 in) was the largest altarpiece Caravaggio painted. It still hangs in St. John's Co-Cathedral, for which it was commissioned and where Caravaggio himself was inducted and briefly served as a knight.

Yet, by late August 1608, he was arrested and imprisoned, likely the result of yet another brawl, this time with an aristocratic knight, during which the door of a house was battered down and the knight seriously wounded. Caravaggio was imprisoned by the Knights at Valletta, but he managed to escape. By December, he had been expelled from the Order "as a foul and rotten member", a formal phrase used in all such cases.

==== Sicily ====
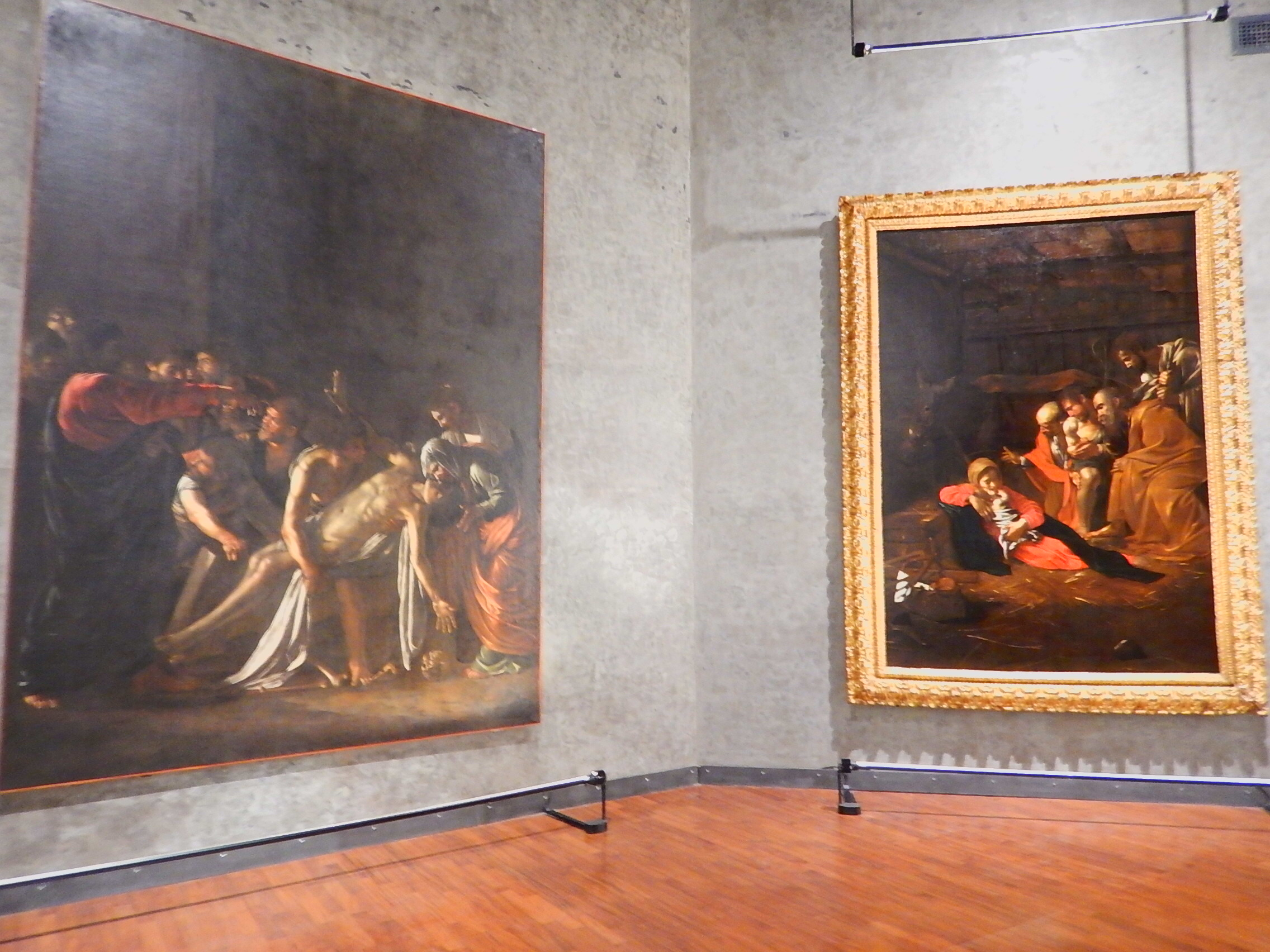
The Raising of Lazarus and the Adoration of the Shepherds, Regional Museum of Messina, Sicily, Italy

Caravaggio made his way to Sicily where he met his old friend Mario Minniti, who was now married and living in Syracuse. Together they set off on what amounted to a triumphal tour from Syracuse to Messina and, maybe, on to the island capital, Palermo. In Syracuse and Messina Caravaggio continued to win prestigious and well-paid commissions. Among other works from this period are Burial of St. Lucy, The Raising of Lazarus, and Adoration of the Shepherds. His style continued to evolve, showing now friezes of figures isolated against vast empty backgrounds. "His great Sicilian altarpieces isolate their shadowy, pitifully poor figures in vast areas of darkness; they suggest the desperate fears and frailty of man, and at the same time convey, with a new yet desolate tenderness, the beauty of humility and of the meek, who shall inherit the earth." Contemporary reports depict a man whose behaviour was becoming increasingly bizarre, which included sleeping fully armed and in his clothes, ripping up a painting at a slight word of criticism, and mocking local painters.

Caravaggio displayed bizarre behaviour from very early in his career. Mancini describes him as "extremely crazy", a letter from Del Monte notes his strangeness, and Minniti's 1724 biographer says that Mario left Caravaggio because of his behaviour. The strangeness seems to have increased after Malta. Susinno's early-18th-century Le vite de' pittori Messinesi ("Lives of the Painters of Messina") provides several colourful anecdotes of Caravaggio's erratic behaviour in Sicily, and these are reproduced in modern full-length biographies such as Langdon and Robb. Bellori writes of Caravaggio's "fear" driving him from city to city across the island and finally, "feeling that it was no longer safe to remain", back to Naples. Baglione says Caravaggio was being "chased by his enemy", but like Bellori does not say who this enemy was.

==== Return to Naples ====
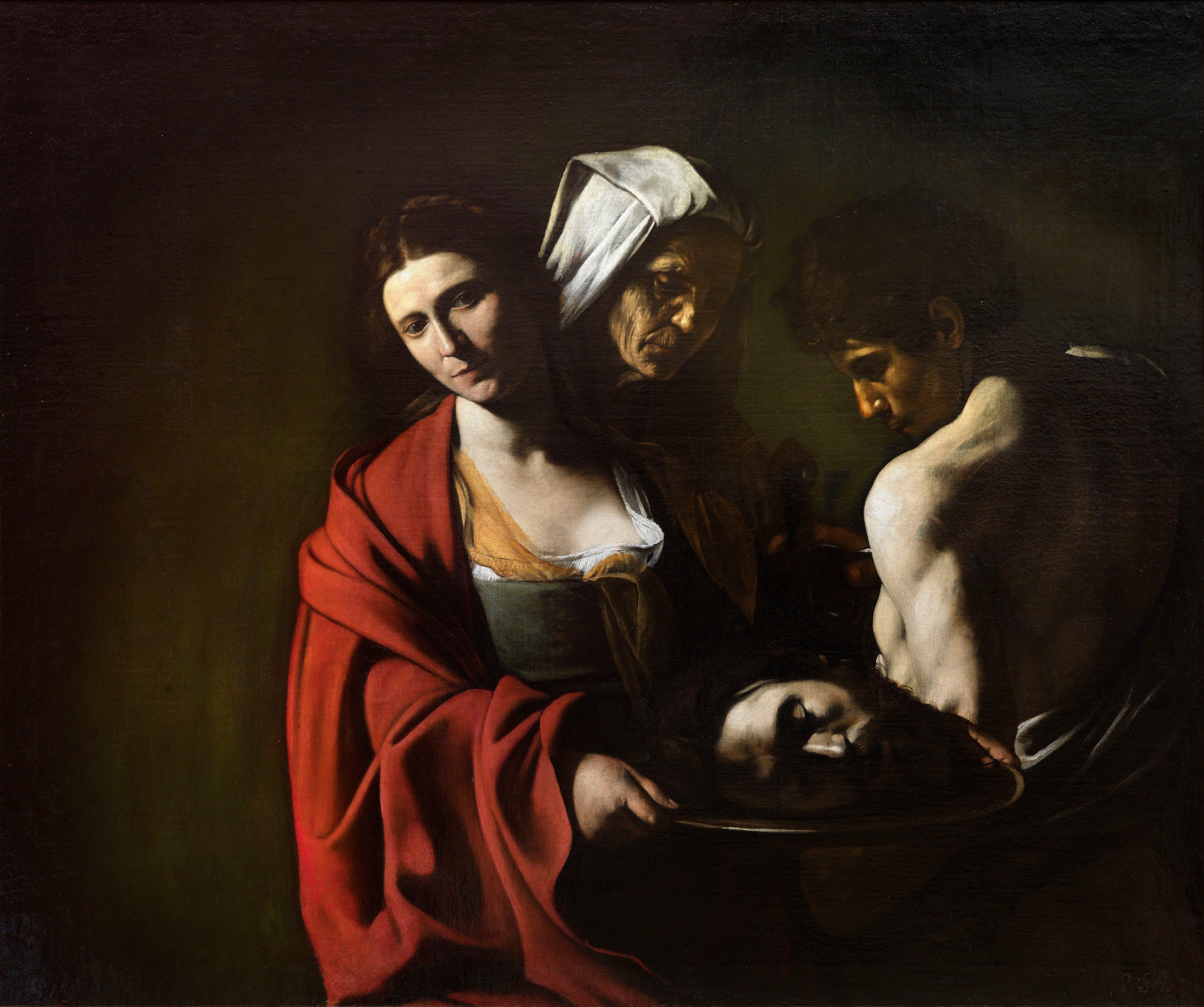
Salome with the Head of John the Baptist, Royal Palace of Madrid

After only nine months in Sicily, Caravaggio returned to Naples in the late summer of 1609. According to his earliest biographer, he was being pursued by enemies while in Sicily and felt it safest to place himself under the protection of the Colonnas until he could secure his pardon from the pope (now Paul V) and return to Rome. In Naples he painted The Denial of Saint Peter, a final John the Baptist (Borghese), and his last picture, The Martyrdom of Saint Ursula. His style continued to evolve—Saint Ursula is caught in a moment of highest action and drama, as the arrow fired by the king of the Huns strikes her in the breast, unlike earlier paintings that had all the immobility of the posed models. The brushwork was also much freer and more impressionistic.

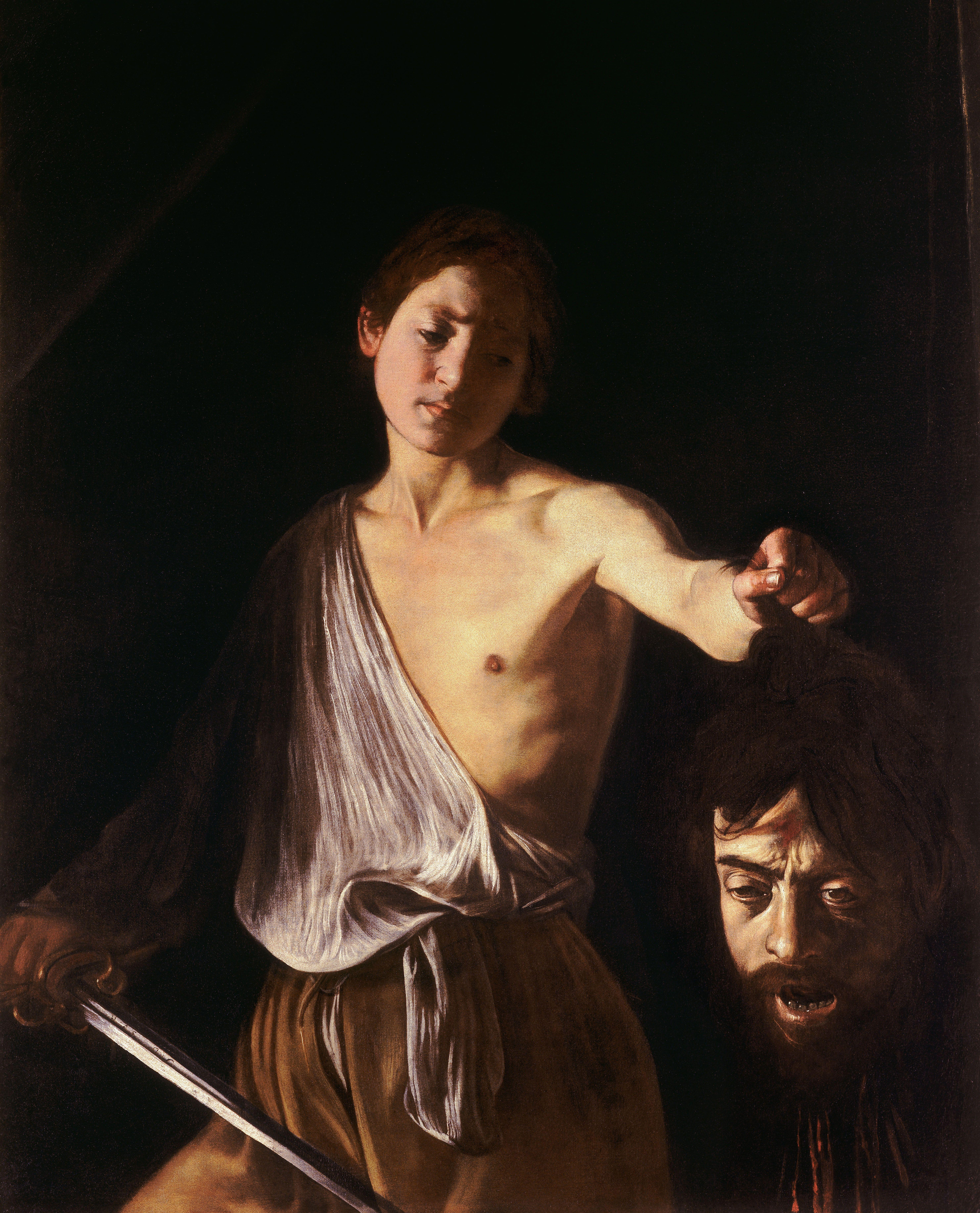
David with the Head of Goliath, 1609–1610, Galleria Borghese, Rome

In October 1609, he was involved in a violent clash, an attempt on his life, perhaps ambushed by men in the pay of the knight he had wounded in Malta or some other faction of the Order. His face was seriously disfigured and rumours circulated in Rome that he was dead. He painted a Salome with the Head of John the Baptist (Madrid), showing his own head on a platter, and sent it to Wignacourt as a plea for forgiveness. Perhaps at this time, he also painted a David with the Head of Goliath, showing the young David with a strangely sorrowful expression gazing at the severed head of the giant, which is again Caravaggio. This painting he may have sent to his patron, the unscrupulous art-loving Cardinal Scipione Borghese, nephew of the pope, who had the power to grant or withhold pardons. Caravaggio hoped Borghese could mediate a pardon in exchange for works by the artist.

News from Rome encouraged Caravaggio, and in the summer of 1610, he took a boat northwards to receive the pardon, which seemed imminent thanks to his powerful Roman friends. With him were three last paintings, the gifts for Cardinal Scipione. What happened next is the subject of much confusion and conjecture, shrouded in much mystery.

The bare facts seem to be that on 28 July, an anonymous avviso (private newsletter) from Rome to the ducal court of Urbino reported that Caravaggio was dead. Three days later, another avviso said that he had died of fever on his way from Naples to Rome. A poet friend of the artist later gave 18 July as the date of death, and a recent researcher claims to have discovered a death notice showing that the artist died on that day of a fever in Porto Ercole, near Grosseto in Tuscany.

=== Death ===
Ossuary of Caravaggio in the municipal cemetery of Porto Ercole.

Caravaggio had a fever at the time of his death, and what killed him was a matter of controversy and rumour at the time and has been a matter of historical debate and study since. Contemporary rumours held that either the Tomassoni family or the Knights had him killed in revenge. Traditionally historians have long thought he died of syphilis. Some have said he had malaria, or possibly brucellosis from unpasteurised dairy. Some scholars have argued that Caravaggio was actually attacked and killed by the same "enemies" that had been pursuing him since he fled Malta, possibly Wignacourt or factions of the Knights.

Caravaggio was buried in the San Sebastiano cemetery of Porto Ercole (in Grosseto) and the remains were moved to the St. Erasmus cemetery when the former closed in 1956. In 2010, archaeologists conducted a year-long investigation of remains found in three crypts and, after using DNA, carbon dating and other methods, declared that they believe with a high degree of confidence that they have identified them to be Caravaggio's. Initial tests suggested Caravaggio might have died of lead poisoning – paints used at the time contained high amounts of lead salts – and Caravaggio is known to have indulged in violent behavior, such as is caused by lead poisoning. Later research published in 2018 concluded he died as the result of a wound sustained in a brawl in Naples, specifically from sepsis caused by Staphylococcus aureus.

Vatican documents released in 2002 support the theory that the wealthy Tomassoni family had him hunted down and killed as a vendetta for Caravaggio's murder of gangster Ranuccio Tomassoni, in a botched attempt at castration after a duel over the affections of model Fillide Melandroni.

== Sexuality ==
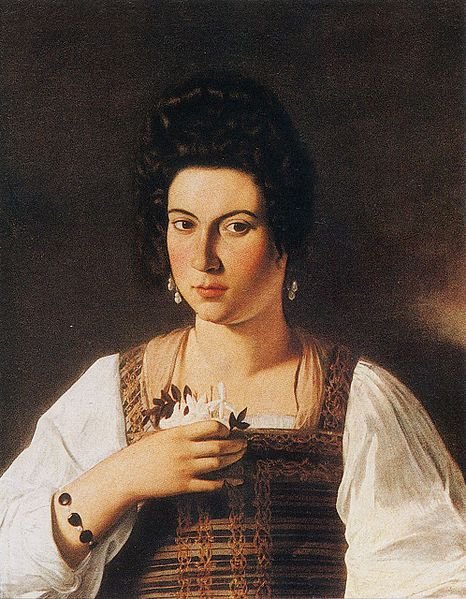
Fillide Melandroni

Since the 1970s art scholars and historians have debated the inferences of homoeroticism in Caravaggio's works as a way to better understand the man. Caravaggio never married and had no known children, and Howard Hibbard observed the absence of erotic female figures in the artist's oeuvre: "In his entire career he did not paint a single female nude", and the cabinet-pieces from the Del Monte period are replete with "full-lipped, languorous boys ... who seem to solicit the onlooker with their offers of fruit, wine, flowers—and themselves" suggesting an erotic interest in the male form. The model for Amor vincit omnia, Cecco del Caravaggio, lived with the artist in Rome and stayed with him even after he was obliged to leave the city in 1606. The two may have been lovers.

A connection with a certain Lena is mentioned in a 1605 court deposition by Pasqualone, where she is described as "Michelangelo's girl". According to G. B. Passeri, this 'Lena' was Caravaggio's model for the Madonna di Loreto; and according to Catherine Puglisi, 'Lena' may have been the same person as the courtesan Maddalena di Paolo Antognetti, who named Caravaggio as an "intimate friend" by her own testimony in 1604. Caravaggio was also rumoured to be madly in love with Fillide Melandroni, a well known Roman prostitute who modeled for him in several important paintings.

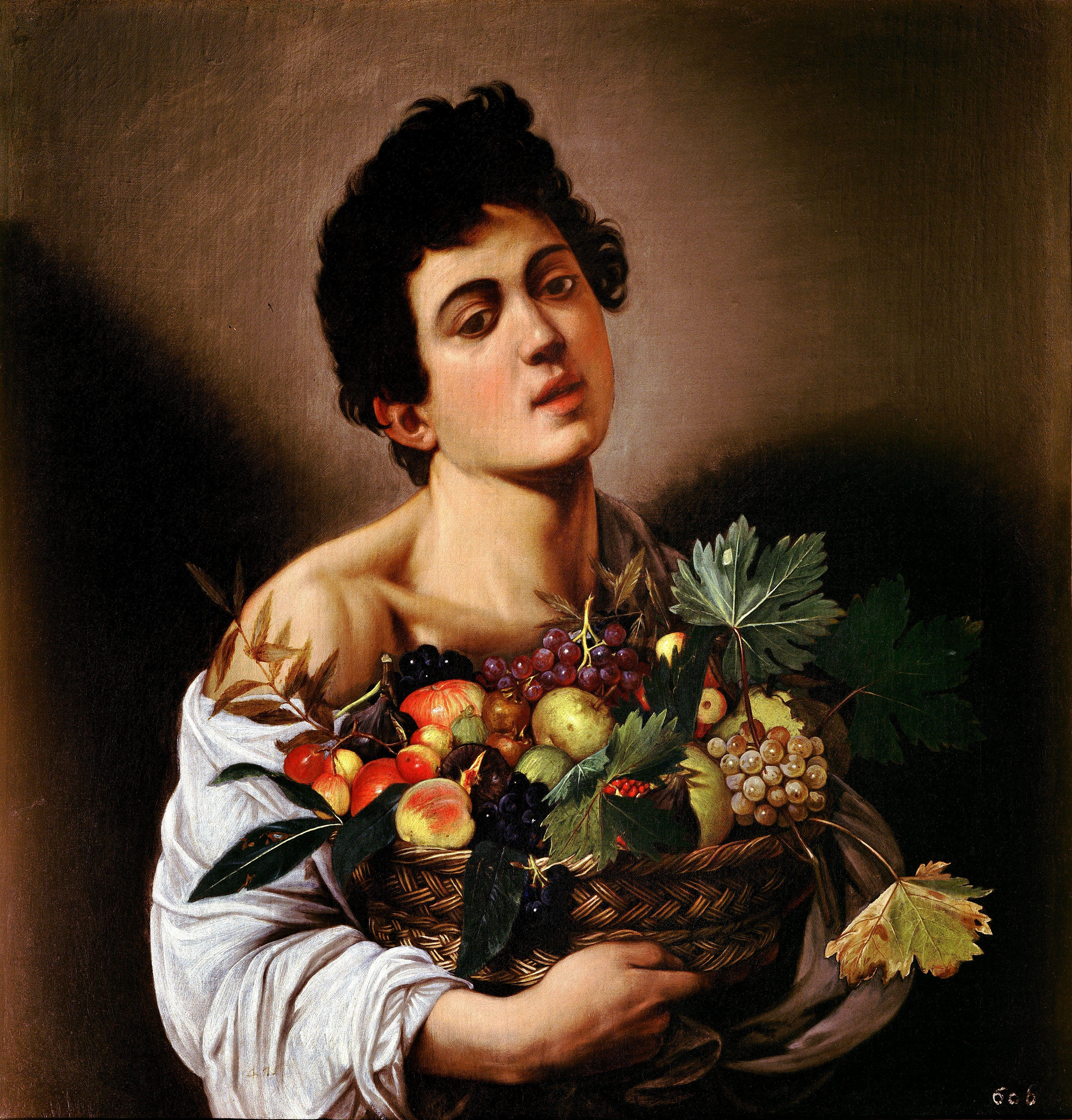
Boy with a Basket of Fruit, 1593–1594, oil on canvas, 67 cm × 53 cm (26 in × 21 in), Galleria Borghese, Rome

Caravaggio's sexuality also received early speculation due to claims about the artist by Honoré Gabriel Riqueti, comte de Mirabeau. Writing in 1783, Mirabeau contrasted the personal life of Caravaggio directly with the writings of St Paul in the Book of Romans, arguing that "Romans" excessively practice sodomy or homosexuality. The Holy Mother Catholic Church teachings on morality (and so on; short book title) contains the Latin phrase "Et fœminæ eorum immutaverunt naturalem usum in eum usum qui est contra naturam." ("and their women changed their natural habit to that which is against nature"). The phrase, according to Mirabeau, entered Caravaggio's thoughts, and he claimed that such an "abomination" could be witnessed through a particular painting housed at the Museum of the Grand Duke of Tuscany—featuring a rosary of a blasphemous nature, in which a circle of thirty men (turpiter ligati) are intertwined in embrace and presented in unbridled composition. Mirabeau notes the affectionate nature of Caravaggio's depiction reflects the voluptuous glow of the artist's sexuality. By the late nineteenth century, Sir Richard Francis Burton identified the painting as Caravaggio's painting of St. Rosario. Burton also identifies both St. Rosario and this painting with the practices of Tiberius mentioned by Seneca the Younger. The survival status and location of Caravaggio's painting is unknown. No such painting appears in his or his school's catalogues.

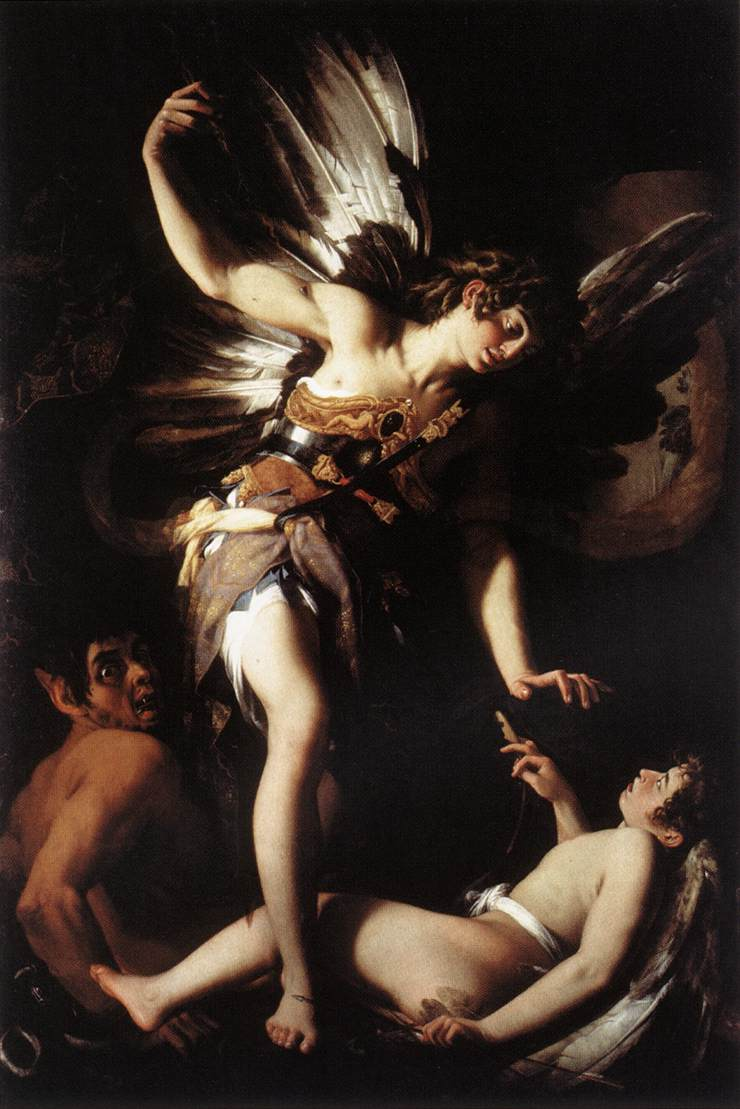
Sacred Love Versus Profane Love (1602–03), by Giovanni Baglione. Intended as an attack on his hated enemy, Caravaggio, it shows a winged male youth with an arrow, most likely a representation of Eros, the god associated with Aphrodite and sexual (i.e., profane) love, on one side, a devil with Caravaggio's face on the other, and between an angel representing pure, meaning non-erotic or sacred, love.

Aside from the paintings, evidence also comes from the libel trial brought against Caravaggio by Giovanni Baglione in 1603. Baglione accused Caravaggio and his friends of writing and distributing scurrilous doggerel attacking him; the pamphlets, according to Baglione's friend and witness Mao Salini, had been distributed by a certain Giovanni Battista, a bardassa, or boy prostitute, shared by Caravaggio and his friend Onorio Longhi. Caravaggio denied knowing any young boy of that name, and the allegation was not followed up.

Baglione's painting of "Divine Love" has also been seen as a visual accusation of sodomy against Caravaggio. Such accusations were damaging and dangerous as sodomy was a capital crime at the time. Even though the authorities were unlikely to investigate such a well-connected person as Caravaggio, "Once an artist had been smeared as a pederast, his work was smeared too." Francesco Susino in his later biography additionally relates the story of how the artist was chased by a schoolmaster in Sicily for spending too long gazing at the boys in his care. Susino presents it as a misunderstanding, but some authors have speculated that Caravaggio may indeed have been seeking sex with the boys, using the incident to explain some of his paintings which they believe to be homoerotic.

The art historian Andrew Graham-Dixon has summarised the debate:

A lot has been made of Caravaggio's presumed homosexuality, which has in more than one previous account of his life been presented as the single key that explains everything, both the power of his art and the misfortunes of his life. There is no absolute proof of it, only strong circumstantial evidence and much rumour. The balance of probability suggests that Caravaggio did indeed have sexual relations with men. But he certainly had female lovers. Throughout the years that he spent in Rome, he kept close company with a number of prostitutes. The truth is that Caravaggio was as uneasy in his relationships as he was in most other aspects of life. He likely slept with men. He did sleep with women. He settled with no one... [but] the idea that he was an early martyr to the drives of an unconventional sexuality is an anachronistic fiction.

Washington Post art critic Philip Kennicott has taken issue with what he regarded as Graham-Dixon's minimizing of Caravaggio's homosexuality:

There was a fussiness to the tone whenever a scholar or curator was forced to grapple with transgressive sexuality, and you can still find it even in relatively recent histories, including Andrew Graham-Dixon's 2010 biography of Caravaggio, which acknowledges only that "he likely slept with men". The author notes the artist's fluid sexual desires but gives some of Caravaggio's most explicitly homoerotic paintings tortured readings to keep them safely in the category of mere "ambiguity".

== As an artist ==
=== The birth of Baroque ===
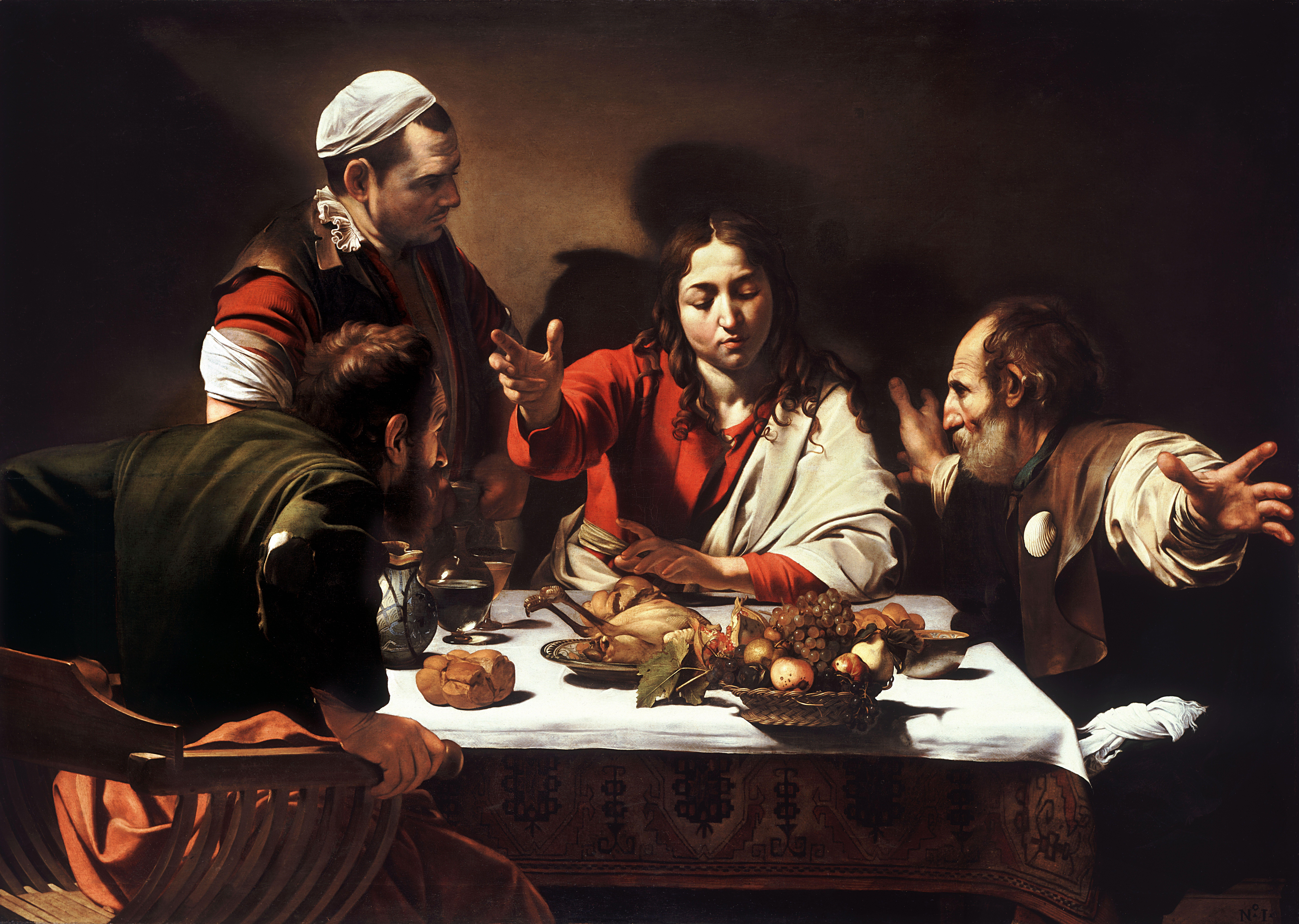
Supper at Emmaus, 1601, oil on canvas, 139 cm × 195 cm (55 in × 77 in), National Gallery, London. Self-portrait of Caravaggio as the figure at the top left.

Caravaggio "put the oscuro (shadows) into chiaroscuro". Chiaroscuro was practised long before he came on the scene, but it was Caravaggio who made the technique a dominant stylistic element, darkening the shadows and transfixing the subject in a blinding shaft of light. With this came the acute observation of physical and psychological reality that formed the ground both for his immense popularity and for his frequent problems with his religious commissions.

He worked at great speed, from live models, scoring basic guides directly onto the canvas with the end of the brush handle; very few of Caravaggio's drawings appear to have survived, and it is likely that he preferred to work directly on the canvas, an unusual approach at the time. His models were basic to his realism; some have been identified, including Mario Minniti and Francesco Boneri, both fellow artists, Minniti appearing as various figures in the early secular works, the young Boneri as a succession of angels, Baptists and Davids in the later canvasses. His female models include Fillide Melandroni, Anna Bianchini, and Maddalena Antognetti (the "Lena" mentioned in court documents of the "artichoke" case as Caravaggio's concubine), all well-known prostitutes, who appear as female religious figures including the Virgin and various saints. Caravaggio himself appears in several paintings, his final self-portrait being as the witness on the far right to the Martyrdom of Saint Ursula.

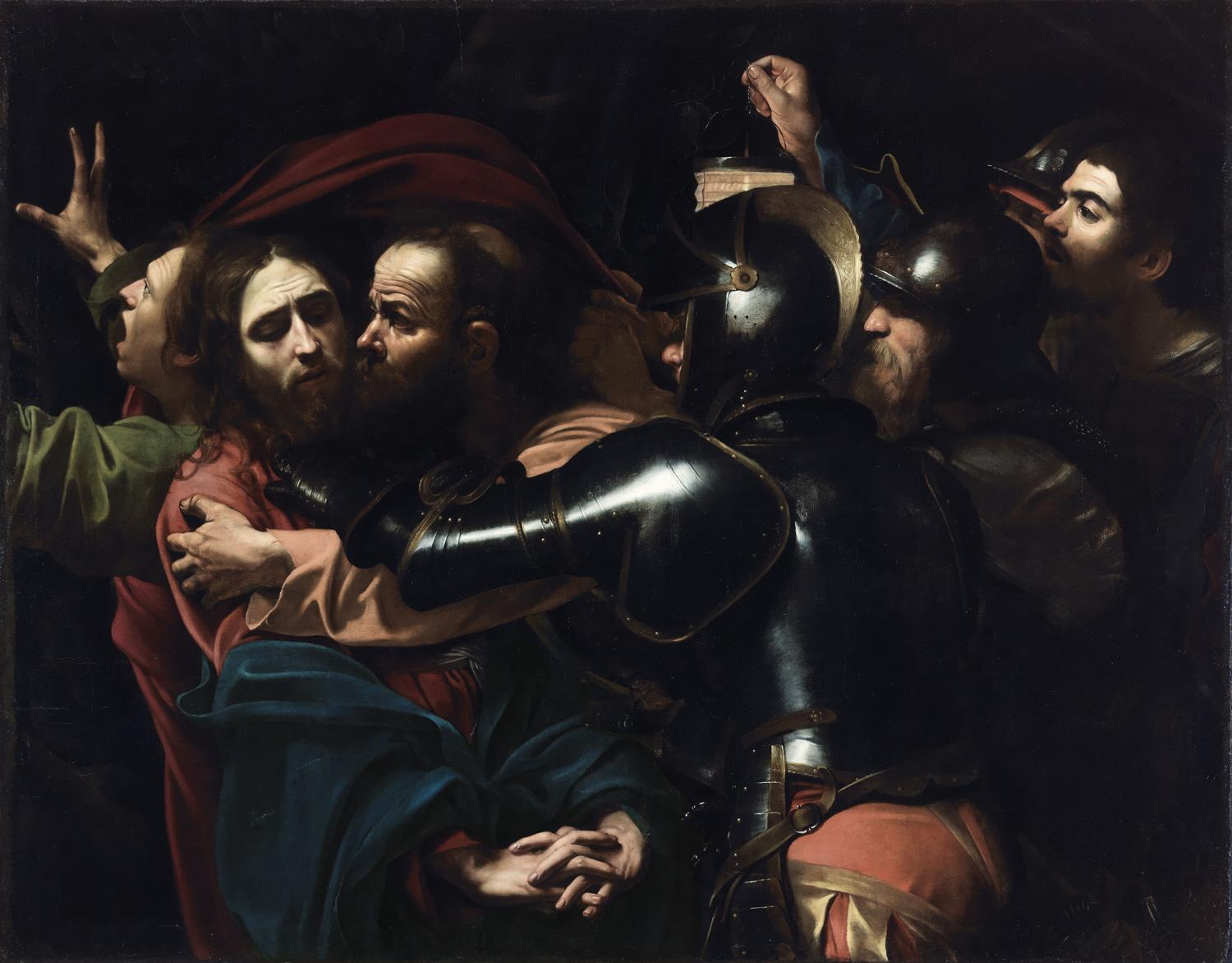
The Taking of Christ, 1602, National Gallery of Ireland, Dublin. The chiaroscuro shows through on the faces and armour even in the absence of a visible shaft of light. The figure on the extreme right is a self-portrait.

Caravaggio had a noteworthy ability to express in one scene of unsurpassed vividness the passing of a crucial moment. The Supper at Emmaus depicts the recognition of Christ by his disciples: a moment before he is a fellow traveller, mourning the passing of the Messiah, as he never ceases to be to the innkeeper's eyes; the second after, he is the Saviour. In The Calling of St Matthew, the hand of the Saint points to himself as if he were saying, "who, me?", while his eyes, fixed upon the figure of Christ, have already said, "Yes, I will follow you". With The Resurrection of Lazarus, he goes a step further, giving a glimpse of the actual physical process of resurrection. The body of Lazarus is still in the throes of rigor mortis, but his hand, facing and recognising that of Christ, is alive. Other major Baroque artists would travel the same path, for example Bernini, fascinated with themes from Ovid's Metamorphoses.

=== The Caravaggisti ===
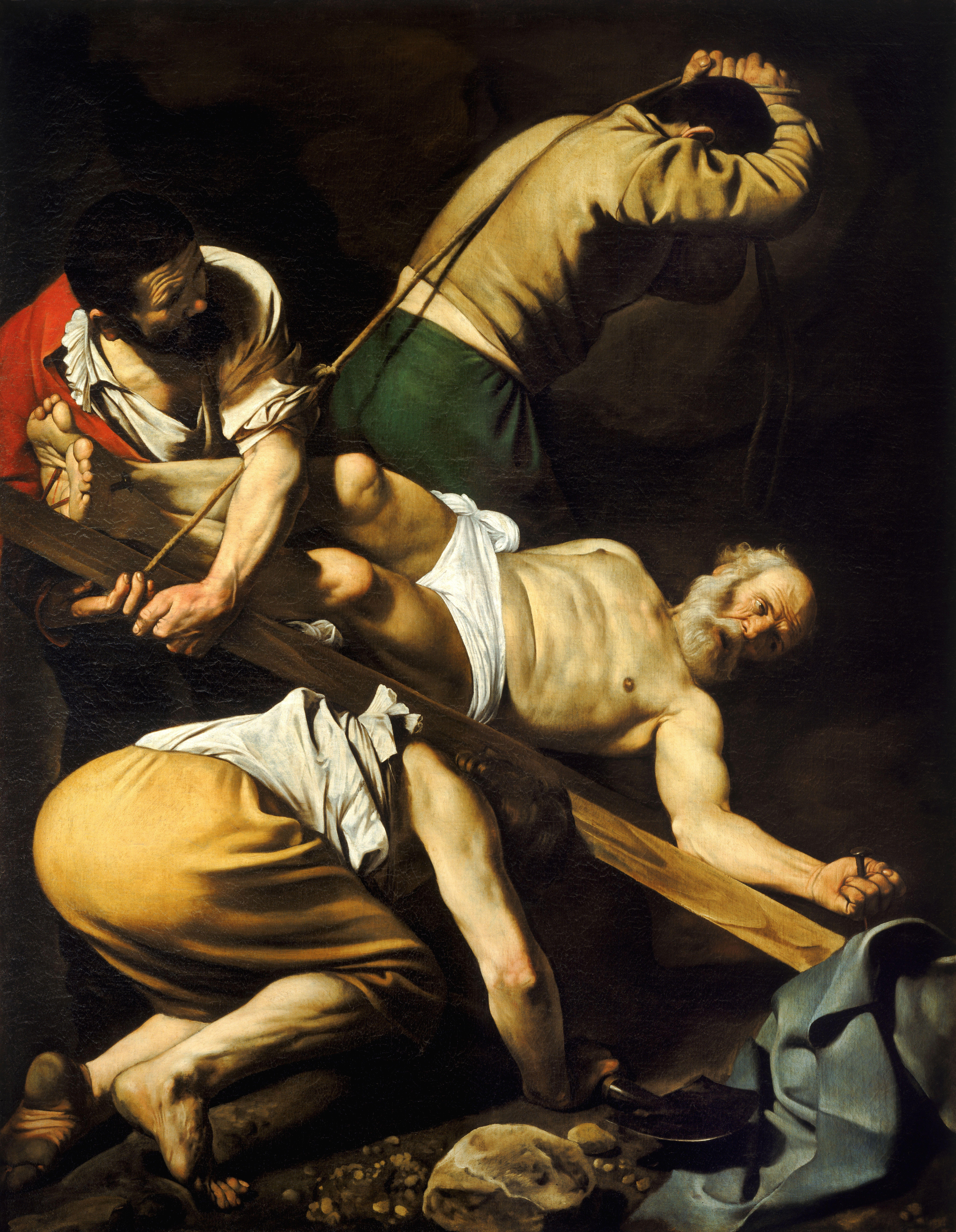
The Crucifixion of Saint Peter, 1601, Cerasi Chapel, Santa Maria del Popolo, Rome

The installation of the St. Matthew paintings in the Contarelli Chapel had an immediate impact among the younger artists in Rome, and Caravaggism became the cutting edge for every ambitious young painter. The first Caravaggisti included Orazio Gentileschi and Giovanni Baglione. Baglione's Caravaggio phase was short-lived; Caravaggio later accused him of plagiarism and the two were involved in a long feud. Baglione went on to write the first biography of Caravaggio. In the next generation of Caravaggisti, there were Carlo Saraceni, Bartolomeo Manfredi and Orazio Borgianni. Gentileschi, despite being considerably older, was the only one of these artists to live much beyond 1620 and ended up as a court painter to Charles I of England. His daughter Artemisia Gentileschi was also stylistically close to Caravaggio and one of the most gifted of the movement. However, in Rome and Italy, it was not Caravaggio, but the influence of his rival Annibale Carracci, blending elements from the High Renaissance and Lombard realism, that ultimately triumphed.

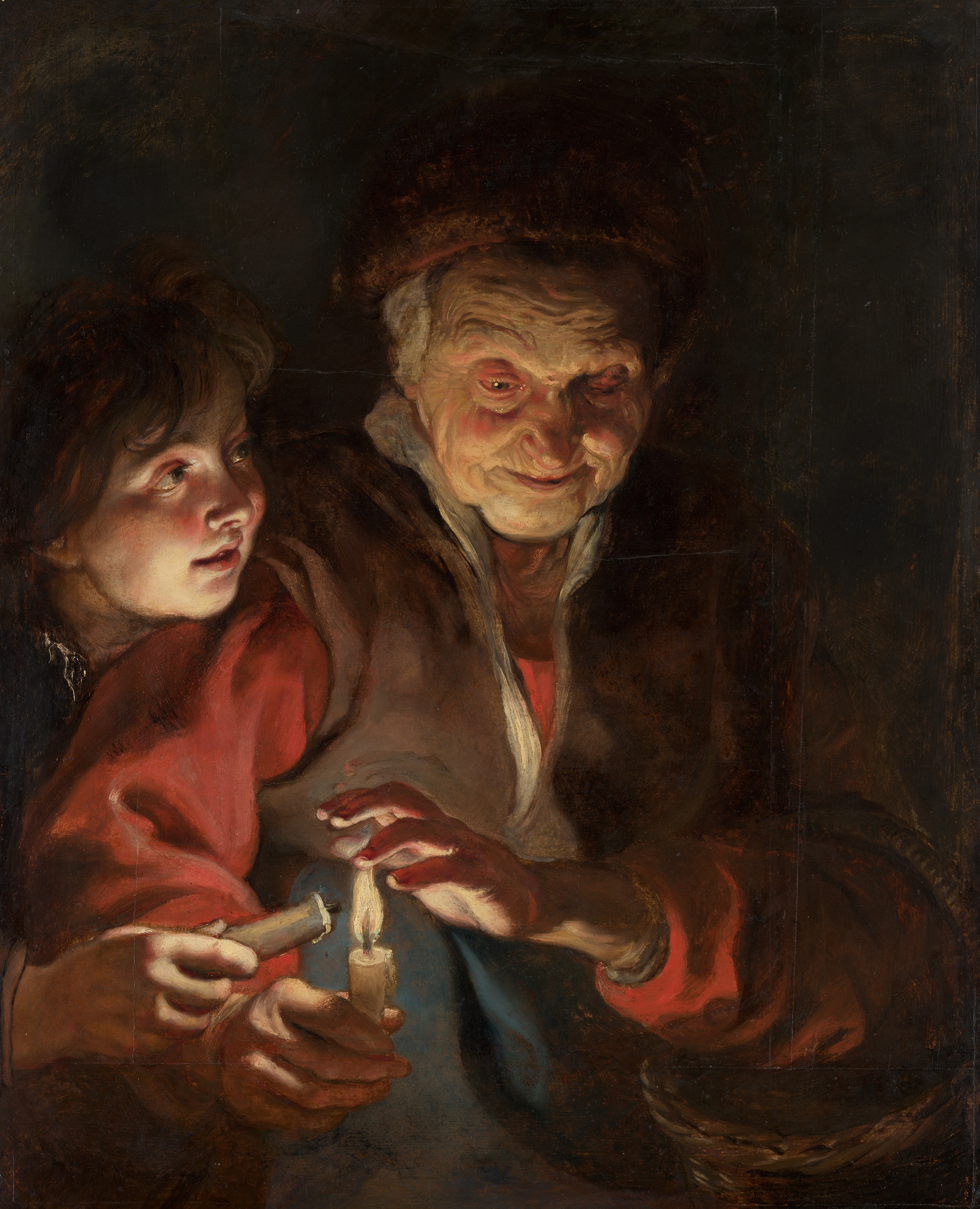
Old Woman and Boy with Candles by Rubens (Mauritshuis, The Hague)

Caravaggio's brief stay in Naples produced a notable school of Neapolitan Caravaggisti, including Battistello Caracciolo and Carlo Sellitto. The Caravaggisti movement there ended with a terrible outbreak of plague in 1656, but the Spanish connection—Naples was a possession of Spain—was instrumental in forming the important Spanish branch of his influence.

Rubens was likely one of the first Flemish artists to be influenced by Caravaggio whose work he got to know during his stay in Rome in 1601. He later painted a copy (or rather an interpretation) of Caravaggio's Entombment of Christ and recommended his patron, the Duke of Mantua, purchase Death of the Virgin (Louvre). Although some of this interest in Caravaggio is reflected in his drawings during his Italian residence, it was only after his return to Antwerp in 1608 that Rubens' works show openly Caravaggesque traits such as in the Cain slaying Abel (1608–1609) (Courtauld Institute of Art) and the Old Woman and Boy with Candles (1618–1619) (Mauritshuis). However, the influence of Caravaggio on Rubens' work would be less important than that of Raphael, Correggio, Barocci and the Venetians. Flemish artists, who were influenced by Rubens, such as Jacob Jordaens, Pieter van Mol, Gaspar de Crayer and Willem Jacob Herreyns, also used certain stark realism and strong contrasts of light and shadow, common to the Caravaggesque style.

A number of Catholic artists from Utrecht, including Hendrick ter Brugghen, Gerrit van Honthorst and Dirck van Baburen travelled in the first decades of the 17th century to Rome. Here they became profoundly influenced by the work of Caravaggio and his followers. On their return to Utrecht, their Caravaggesque works inspired a short-lived but influential flowering of artworks inspired indirectly in style and subject matter by the works of Caravaggio and the Italian followers of Caravaggio. This style of painting was later referred to as Utrecht Caravaggism. In the following generation of Dutch artists the effects of Caravaggio, although attenuated, are to be seen in the work of Vermeer and Rembrandt, neither of whom visited Italy.

=== Death and rebirth of a reputation ===
The Entombment of Christ, (1602–1603), Pinacoteca Vaticana, Rome

Caravaggio's innovations inspired the Baroque, but the Baroque took the drama of his chiaroscuro without the psychological realism. While he directly influenced the style of the artists mentioned above, and, at a distance, the Frenchmen Georges de La Tour and Simon Vouet, and the Spaniard Giuseppe Ribera, within a few decades his works were being ascribed to less scandalous artists, or simply overlooked. The Baroque, to which he contributed so much, had evolved, and fashions had changed, but perhaps more pertinently, Caravaggio never established a workshop as the Carracci did and thus had no school to spread his techniques. Nor did he ever set out his underlying philosophical approach to art, the psychological realism that may only be deduced from his surviving work.

Thus his reputation was doubly vulnerable to the unsympathetic critiques of his earliest biographers, Giovanni Baglione, a rival painter with a vendetta, and the influential 17th-century critic Gian Pietro Bellori, who had not known him but was under the influence of the earlier Giovanni Battista Agucchi and Bellori's friend Poussin, in preferring the "classical-idealistic" tradition of the Bolognese school led by the Carracci. Baglione, his first biographer, played a considerable part in creating the legend of Caravaggio's unstable and violent character, as well as his inability to draw.

In the 1920s, art critic Roberto Longhi brought Caravaggio's name once more to the foreground and placed him in the European tradition: "Ribera, Vermeer, La Tour and Rembrandt could never have existed without him. And the art of Delacroix, Courbet and Manet would have been utterly different". The influential Bernard Berenson agreed: "With the exception of Michelangelo, no other Italian painter exercised so great an influence."

=== Epitaph ===
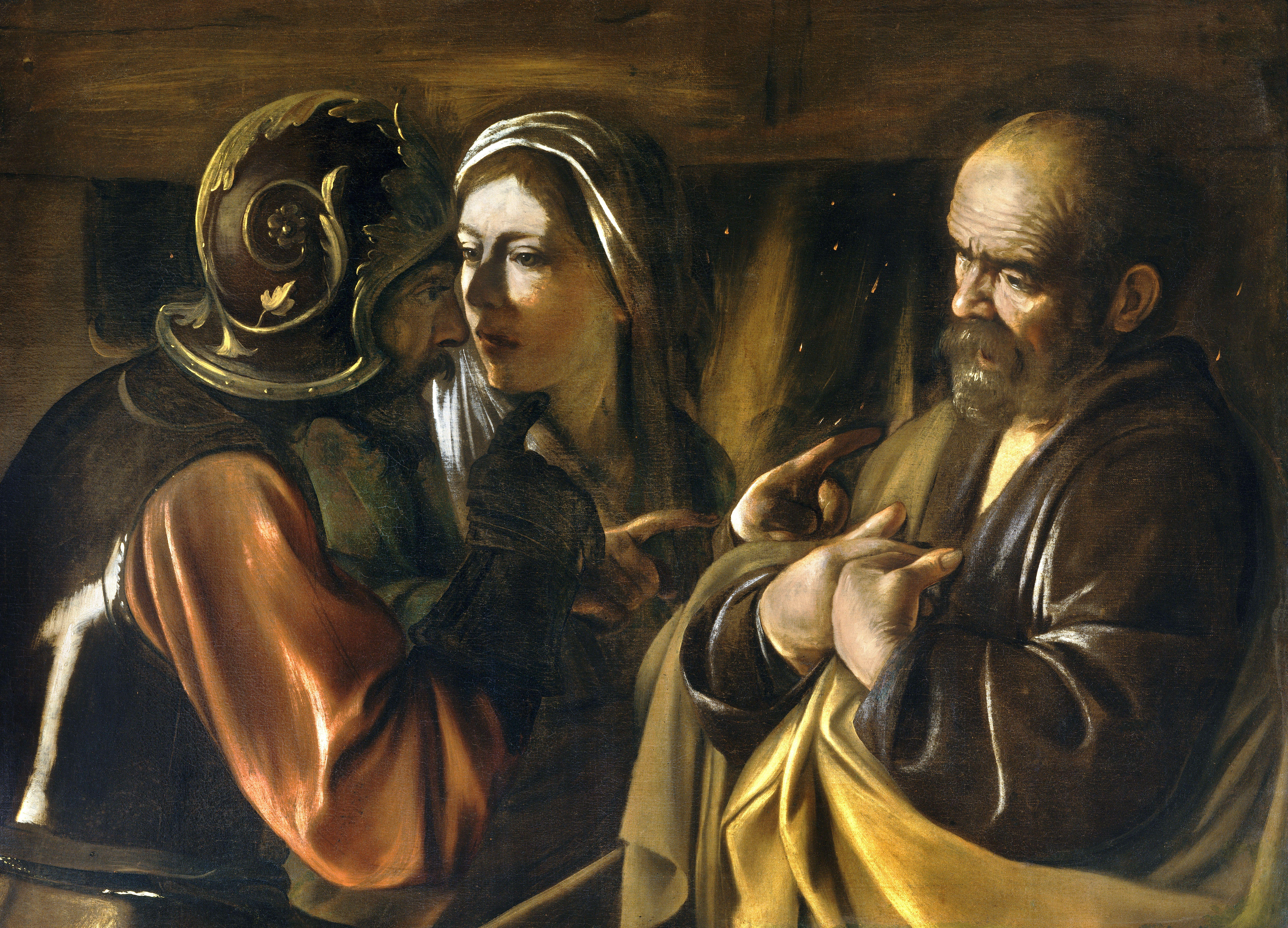
The Denial of Saint Peter (1610), Metropolitan Museum of Art, New York City

Caravaggio's epitaph was composed by his friend Marzio Milesi. It reads:

"Michelangelo Merisi, son of Fermo di Caravaggio – in painting not equal to a painter, but to Nature itself – died in Port' Ercole – betaking himself hither from Naples – returning to Rome – 15th calend of August – In the year of our Lord 1610 – He lived thirty-six years nine months and twenty days – Marzio Milesi, Jurisconsult – Dedicated this to a friend of extraordinary genius."

He was commemorated on the front of the Banca d'Italia 100,000-lire banknote in the 1980s and '90s (before Italy switched to the euro), with the back showing his Basket of Fruit.

== Oeuvre ==
There is disagreement as to the size of Caravaggio's oeuvre, with counts as low as 40 and as high as 80. In his monograph of 1983, the Caravaggio scholar Alfred Moir wrote, "The forty-eight color plates in this book include almost all of the surviving works accepted by every Caravaggio expert as autograph, and even the least demanding would add fewer than a dozen more", but there have been some generally accepted additions since then. One, The Calling of Saints Peter and Andrew, was in 2006 authenticated and restored; it had been in storage in Hampton Court, mislabeled as a copy. Richard Francis Burton writes of a "picture of St. Rosario (in the museum of the Grand Duke of Tuscany), showing a circle of thirty men turpiter ligati" ("lewdly banded"), which is not known to have survived. The rejected version of Saint Matthew and the Angel, intended for the Contarelli Chapel in San Luigi dei Francesi in Rome, was acquired by Vincenzo Giustiniani, and ultimately acquired by the Kaiser Friedrich Museum (now the Gemäldegalerie) in Berlin. It was among the large paintings transported to the Friedrichshain flak tower. (Note: Portrait of Fillide Melandroni and Christ on the Mount of Olives, also attributed to Caravaggio, were among those destroyed.) It is presumed to have been destroyed during a fire in 1945, though black and white photographs of the work exist. In June 2011 it was announced that a previously unknown Caravaggio painting of Saint Augustine dating to about 1600 had been discovered in a private collection in Britain. Called a "significant discovery", the painting had never been published and is thought to have been commissioned by Vincenzo Giustiniani, a patron of the painter in Rome.

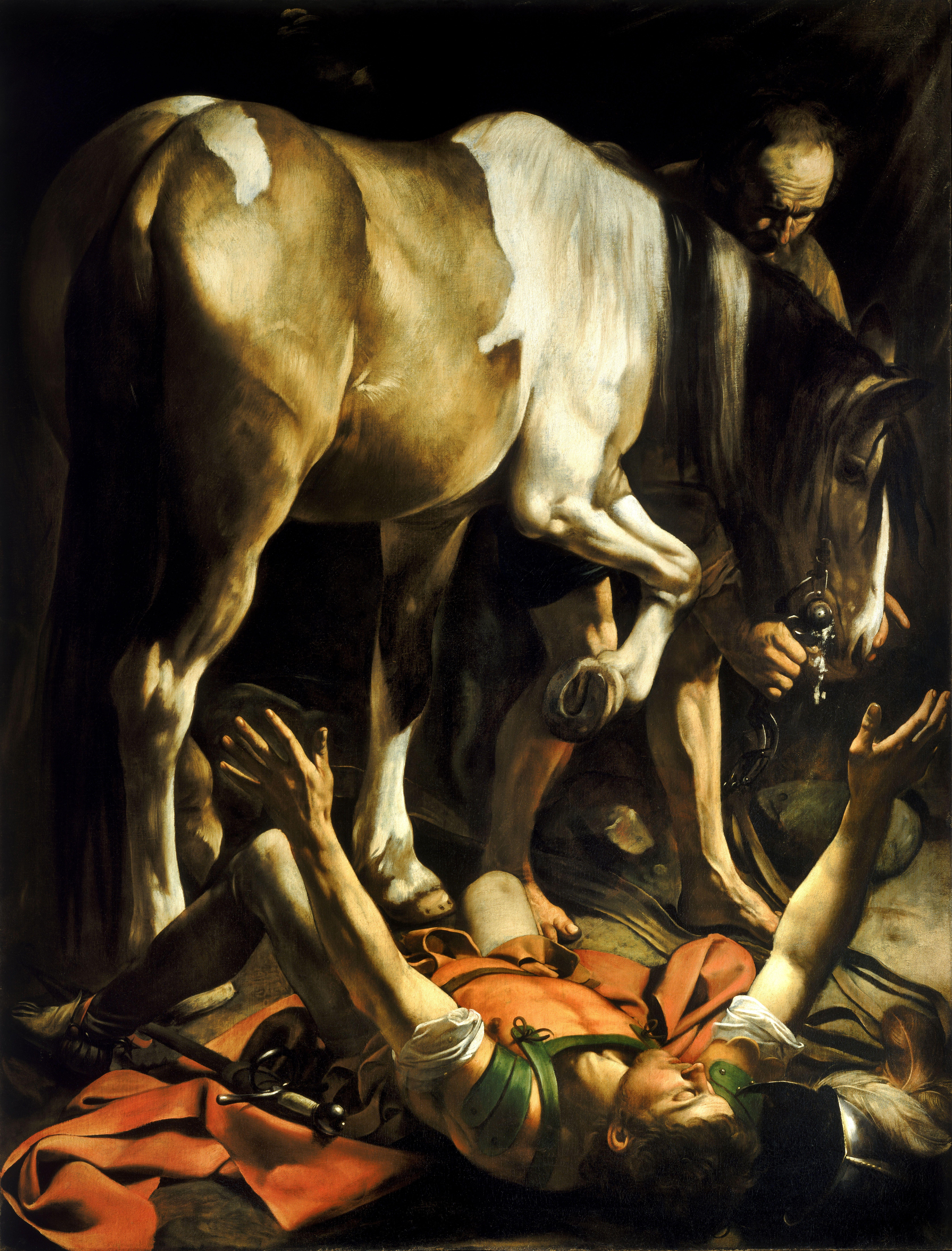
Conversion on the Way to Damascus, 1601, Cerasi Chapel, Santa Maria del Popolo, Rome

A painting depicting Judith Beheading Holofernes was allegedly discovered in an attic in Toulouse in 2014. In April 2016 the expert and art dealer to whom the work was shown announced that this was a long-lost painting by the hand of Caravaggio himself. That lost Caravaggio painting was only known up to that date by a presumed copy of it by the Flemish painter Louis Finson, who had shared a studio with Caravaggio in Naples. The French government imposed an export ban on the newly discovered painting while tests were carried out to establish whether it was an authentic painting by Caravaggio. In February 2019 it was announced that the painting would be sold at auction after the Louvre had turned down the opportunity to purchase it for €100 million. After an auction was considered, the painting was finally sold in a private sale to the American billionaire hedge fund manager J. Tomilson Hill. The art historical world is not united over the attribution of the work, with the art dealer who sold the work promoting its authenticity with the support of art historians who were given privileged access to the work, while other art historians remain unconvinced mainly based on stylistic and quality considerations. Some art historians believe it may be a work by Louis Finson himself.

In April 2021 a minor work believed to be from the circle of a Spanish follower of Caravaggio, Jusepe de Ribera, was withdrawn from sale at the Madrid auction house Ansorena when the Museo del Prado alerted the Ministry of Culture, which placed a preemptive export ban on the painting. The 111 centimetres (44 in) by 86 centimetres (34 in) painting has been in the Pérez de Castro family since 1823, when it was exchanged for another work from the Real Academia of San Fernando. It had been listed as "Ecce-Hommo con dos saiones de Carabaggio" before the attribution was later lost or changed to the circle of Ribera. Stylistic evidence, as well as the similarity of the models to those in other Caravaggio works, has convinced some experts that the painting is the original Caravaggio 'Ecce Homo' for the 1605 Massimo Massimi commission. The attribution to Caravaggio is disputed by other experts. The painting is now undergoing restoration by Colnaghis, who will also be handling the future sale of the work.

== Theft ==
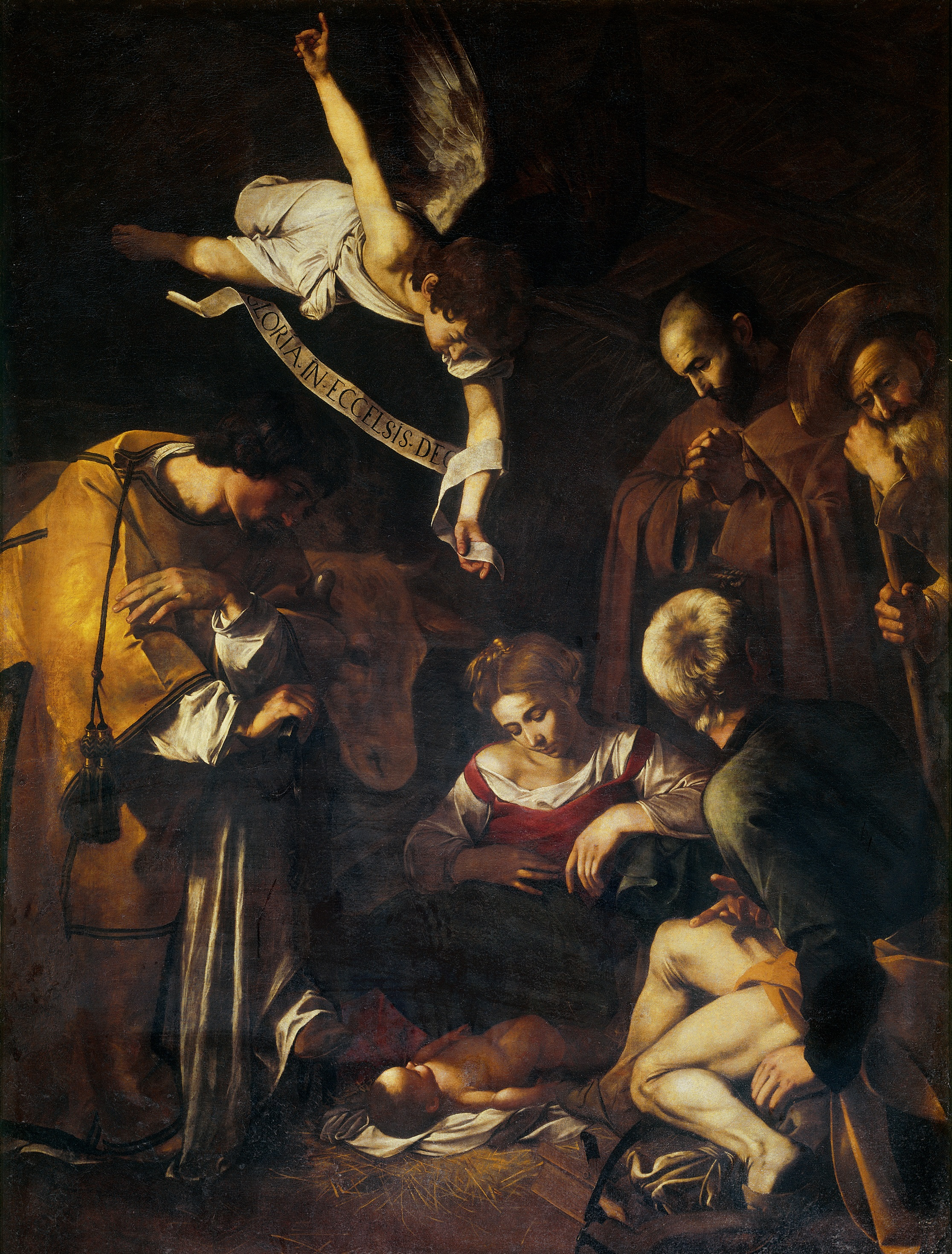
Nativity with St. Francis and St. Lawrence, 1600; stolen in 1969

In October 1969, two thieves entered the Oratory of Saint Lawrence in Palermo, Sicily, and stole Caravaggio's Nativity with St. Francis and St. Lawrence from its frame. Experts estimated its value at $20 million.

Following the theft, Italian police set up an art theft task force with the specific aim of re-acquiring lost and stolen artworks. Since the creation of this task force, many leads have been followed regarding the Nativity. Former Italian mafia members have stated that Nativity with St. Francis and St. Lawrence was stolen by the Sicilian Mafia and displayed at important mafia gatherings. Former mafia members have said that the Nativity was damaged and has since been destroyed.

The whereabouts of the painting are still unknown. A reproduction currently hangs in its place in the Oratory of San Lorenzo.

In December 1984, Saint Jerome Writing (Caravaggio, Valletta) was stolen from the St. John's Co-Cathedral, Malta. The canvas was cut out of the frame. The painting was recovered two years later, following negotiations between the thieves and Fr. Marius J. Zerafa, then the Director of Museums in Malta. A full account of the theft and successful recovery had been recorded by Fr. Marius J. Zerafa in his book Caravaggio Diaries.

== In popular culture ==
Caravaggio's work has been widely influential in late-20th-century American gay culture, with frequent references to male sexual imagery in paintings such as The Musicians and Amor Victorious. Several poems written by Thom Gunn were responses to specific Caravaggio paintings, and British filmmaker Derek Jarman made a critically applauded biopic entitled Caravaggio in 1986.

Another biopic, L'Ombra di Caravaggio (Caravaggio's Shadow), directed by Michele Placido and starring Riccardo Scamarcio, was released in 2022.

Caravaggio was prominently featured as motif in Steven Zaillian's Netflix series Ripley, based on Patricia Highsmith's book The Talented Mr. Ripley. The murder of Rannucchio is also depicted. Caravaggio is portrayed by Daniele Rienzo.

Caravaggio, a full-length documentary on his life by Phil Grabsky and David Bickerstaff was released in November 2025.

== Contemporary analysis ==
Caravaggio's baroque art was reassessed as self-consciously political in the 1999 book Quoting Caravaggio by Mieke Bal.

== See also ==
- Paintings in the Contarelli Chapel
- List of paintings by Caravaggio
