= Portrait of a Courtesan (Caravaggio) =

Painting by Caravaggio

Portrait of a Courtesan (Fillide Melandroni)
- Cortigiana Fillide (Italian)
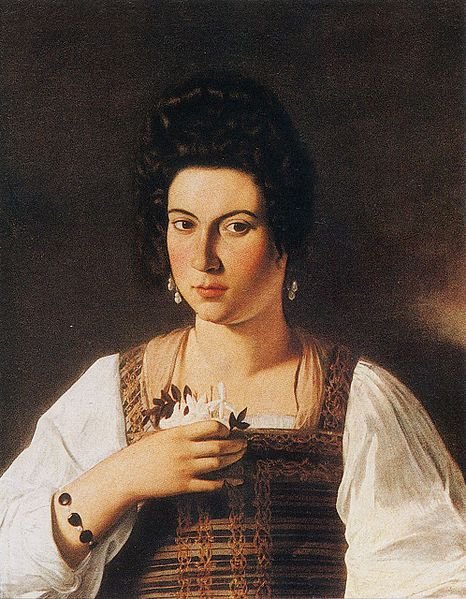
- Artist: Caravaggio
- Year: c. 1597
- Medium: Oil on canvas
- Dimensions: 66 cm × 53 cm (26 in × 21 in)
- Location: Destroyed

Portrait of a Courtesan (also known as Portrait of Fillide) was an oil on canvas painting by the Italian Baroque painter Caravaggio. Painted between 1597 and 1599, it has been suggested that the portrait represents the courtesan Fillide Melandroni as the goddess Flora. It was destroyed in Berlin in 1945 and is known only from photographs.

== Interpretation ==
Earlier scholars identified the flower she presses to her breast as orange blossom or bergamot, symbol of marriage and fidelity, and claimed the subject as Caterina Campi, wife of Caravaggio's friend Onorio Longhi. Caravaggio scholar John Gash, however, identifies the flowers as "definitely jasmine", symbol of erotic love, and therefore more suitable to a courtesan than to a respectable married woman. The portrait belonged to Caravaggio's patron, Marchese Vincenzo Giustiniani, and the 1638 inventory of the Giustiniani collection lists a "portrait of a courtesan named Fillide", identified by modern scholars as Fillide Melandroni. But the commissioner was Fillide's client nobleman Giulio Strozzi to whom she bequeathed the painting in her will of October 8, 1614.

Fillide figured prominently in Caravaggio's work in the closing years of the 1590s, appearing as Saint Catherine, as Mary in Martha and Mary Magdalene, and as Judith in Judith Beheading Holofernes. She may have appeared even more frequently – a considerable number of Caravaggio's works are now lost – but she seems to vanish from his paintings after 1599. If sophisticated patrons such as Giustiniani represented one pole of Caravaggio's life, the world of Fillide was the other. She was one of Rome's most successful prostitutes, much sought after by the Roman elite; but she had her true existence in the streets. In February 1599 she was arrested together with a young man named Ranuccio Tomassoni, who seems to have been her pimp, (he came from a good family but was continually turning up in police records in the company of prostitutes, and not as a customer), and charged with creating a disturbance in connection with a noisy Mardi Gras party in her house. Fillide's friends included another prostitute, Anna Bianchini, who modelled for Caravaggio as Mary Magdalene in his Penitent Magdalene, as Martha (opposite Fillide) in Martha and Mary Magdalene, and as the Mother of Christ in Rest on the Flight into Egypt. Tomassoni would also appear again, but not in paintings: in 1606 Caravaggio killed Tomassoni in an attempt to castrate him.

== Provenance ==
In 1812, the descendants of Giustiniani, due to the financial difficulties of the family, put up for sale a significant part of the family's painting collections, which were purchased by Frederick William III of Prussia in 1815. It is believed that this sale included the current portrait which was then placed in the Kaiser Friedrich Museum, in Berlin. The canvas was probably destroyed in a great fire that took place in 1945, where many works of art were lost, including other paintings by Caravaggio, also from the Giustiniani collection.

== Contemporary versions ==
In 2017, Tasmanian artist Johannes Verhoeff was given the task to create two versions of the Portrait of a Courtesan at MONA (Museum of Old and New Art, in Hobart, Tasmania). This was part of an experiment to determine if a theory put forward by Caravaggio expert Roberta Lupucci, of Florence, Italy, could be true. Lapucci proposed that the original painting was made with the help of a number of optical devices which caused a facial distortion, claimed to be quite noticeable in the portrait. Verhoeff was tasked to make one recreation with the original distortion, whereas the second painting was created to represent Fillide as she could have looked without the optical distortion. Both paintings now belong to MONA.

== Literature References ==
2020 book by German novelist Ingrid Noll, "In Liebe Dein Karl", contains a fictional story written from the perspective of Fillide, called "Das weisse Hemd der Hure" (The white shirt of the prostitute), which tells of the encounter of Fillide and Caravaggio.

== See also ==
- List of paintings by Caravaggio
