= Fillide Melandroni =

Italian courtesan and art model

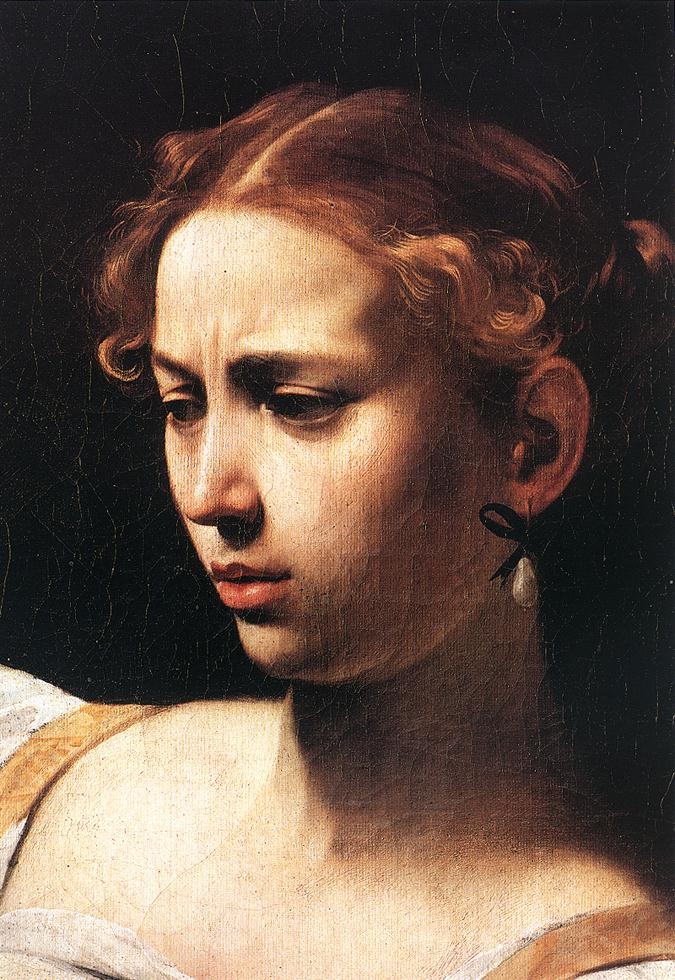
- Detail of Fillide Melandroni from Judith Beheading Holofernes (Caravaggio) (1599)
- Born: 1581; Siena, Italy
- Died: 1618 (aged 37); Rome, Italy
- Occupations: Courtesan, artist's model
- Known for: Model in several of Caravaggio works

Fillide Melandroni (Siena, 1581 – Rome, 1618) was an Italian courtesan and friend of the painter Caravaggio, who used her as a model in several of his compositions.

== Biography ==
Melandroni was born in Siena, Italy, in 1581. Her father, Enea, died when she was young and in February 1593 her mother, Cinzia, took Fillide and her brother Sivilo to Rome. Her friend Anna Bianchini, (Note: Anna Bianchini would also go on to model for Caravaggio as Mary Magdalene in his Penitent Magdalene, as Martha (opposite Melandroni) in Martha and Mary Magdalene, and as the Mother of Christ in Rest on the Flight into Egypt.) Bianchini's mother Sibilla, brother Mateo, and sister Alessandra went to Rome with them. In Rome, the two families stayed at the same house in Via dell'Armata. Soon after, the two mothers set the girls to work as prostitutes. Melandroni and Bianchini were arrested in April 1594 for being outside the brothel quarter after dusk, suspected of soliciting; they were just 13 and 14 years old respectively at the time.

Melandroni rose amongst the ranks of prostitutes to become one of the most sought-after women in Rome. She had a house in Rome's Ortaccio, (Note: The Ortaccio was an area of Rome that Pope Pius V ordered the city's prostitutes to be confined to in 1566.) and many wealthy clients, including cardinals and bankers. One of the most notable was Italian banker and art collector Vincenzo Giustiniani who was the patron of the artist Caravaggio. Fillide figured prominently in Caravaggio's work in the closing years of the 1590s, appearing in Portrait of a Courtesan, as Saint Catherine, as Mary in Martha and Mary Magdalene, and as Judith in Judith Beheading Holofernes. She may have appeared even more frequently - a considerable number of Caravaggio's works are now lost - but she seems to vanish from his paintings after 1599, except perhaps in The Entombment of Christ (1603). (Note: Graham-Dixon's assertion that Melandroni was the model for two of the figures in The Entombment of Christ is not universally agreed.)

Melandroni was involved with a young man from a noble family, Ranuccio Tomassoni, who may have been her pimp. On 11 February 1599, there was a complaint about a noisy party at Melandroni house, and that the men in attendance were armed. As the carrying of arms was prohibited in the Ortaccio the authorities went to the house. By the time of their arrival, there was only Melandroni and three men present, one of whom was Tomassoni who was wearing a sword. Melandroni and Tomassoni were arrested.

The Vicariate of Rome declared Melandroni a "cortigiana scandalosa" in 1599 for refusing the sacrament. Later the same year she was arrested for possessing a weapon that Tomassoni had given her.

In late 1600, Melandroni was reported to the police for attacking another courtesan, Prudenza Zacchia, with a knife, cutting her above the wrist after Zacchia raised her arm to defend herself. Melandroni had previously attacked Zacchia with a knife after she found her in bed with Tomassoni. On that occasion Melandroni had been disarmed by another male who was present.

Caravaggio killed Tomassoni, perhaps unintentionally, on 28 May 1606. The two fought after a game of tennis and when Tomassoni fell to the ground, Caravaggio delivered a fatal stab to Tomassoni's upper thigh. Whilst some writers attribute the fight to a disagreement over the tennis match, others point to a deeper disagreement between the two, possibly over Caravaggio having a longstanding debt to Tomassoni, a dispute over Melandroni or the suggestion Caravaggio was a homosexual. Those authors take the view that Caravaggio had tried to castrate Tomassoni but the sword had caught Tomassoni's upper thigh and cut his femoral artery causing him to bleed to death. (Note: During the renaissance period, honour was restored by cutting an opponent's face if a man's reputation was insulted, or cutting off the opponent's penis or testicles if a man's woman was insulted. This has been interpreted as strengthening the case that the argument was over Fillide Melandroni. Caravaggio had, the year before, had an altercation over another prostitute, Lena, who modelled for him. On this occasion he had struck a young lawyer with an axe to the head. Although injured the lawyer survived.) After the murder Caravaggio fled the city.

In 1612 Melandroni was forced to leave Rome by the family of Venetian poet and libretto writer Giulio Strozzi, who was her current lover. She returned to Rome two years later. Writing a will in October 1614, Melandroni bequeathed her portrait by Caravaggio to Strozzi. This was possibly a different work than the Portrait of a Courtesan.

Melandroni died in 1618, at the age of thirty-seven. The Church refused to give her a Christian burial.

== In Caravaggio's paintings ==
Work	Year	Character	Current location
Portrait of a Courtesan	1597	Courtesan	Destroyed in a fire at the Kaiser-Friedrich-Museum, Berlin in 1945.
Martha and Mary Magdalene	1598	Mary Magdalene (on right)	Detroit Institute of Arts, Detroit
Saint Catherine of Alexandria	1598	Catherine of Alexandria	Thyssen-Bornemisza Museum, Madrid
Judith Beheading Holofernes	1599	Judith	Galleria Nazionale d'Arte Antica, Rome
The Entombment of Christ	1603	Figures rear right and left	Vatican Pinacoteca, Vatican City

== Notes and references ==
=== Bibliography ===
- Domínguez, Javier Bacariza; Fernández, Luis Nieto; Ledesma, Andrés Sánchez; Thyssen-Bornemisza, Museo (2008). Caravaggism and classicism in Italian painting at the Thyssen- Bornemisza Museum: a technical and historical study. Rayxart Investigación. ISBN 9788461216437.
- Erhardt, Michelle; Morris, Amy (2012). Mary Magdalene, Iconographic Studies from the Middle Ages to the Baroque. BRILL. ISBN 978-90-04-23195-5.
- Graham-Dixon, Andrew (2011). Caravaggio: A Life Sacred and Profane. Penguin Books Limited. ISBN 978-0-241-95464-5.
- Hunt, Patrick (2004). Caravaggio. Haus Pub. ISBN 978-1-904341-73-4.
- Mancini, Giulio; Baglione, Giovanni; Bellori, Giovanni Pietro (2019). Lives of Caravaggio. Getty Publications. ISBN 978-1-60606-622-5.
- Milner, Catherine (2 June 2002). "Red-blooded Caravaggio killed love rival in bungled castration attempt". The Telegraph.
- Neret, Gilles (2010). Caravaggio. Taschen. ISBN 978-3-8365-3685-1.
- Pullan, Brian (2016). Tolerance, regulation and rescue: Dishonoured women and abandoned children in Italy, 1300–1800. Manchester University Press. ISBN 978-1-5261-0021-4.
- Robb, Peter (2001). M: The Man Who Became Caravaggio. Macmillan. ISBN 978-0-312-27474-0.
- Spike, John T.; Caravaggio, Michelangelo Merisi da (2010). Caravaggio: Catalogue of Paintings. Abbeville Press. ISBN 978-0-7892-1059-3.
- Varriano, John (2010). Caravaggio: The Art of Realism. Penn State Press. ISBN 978-0-271-04703-4.
