= Saint Catherine of Alexandria (Raphael) =

Painting by Raphael

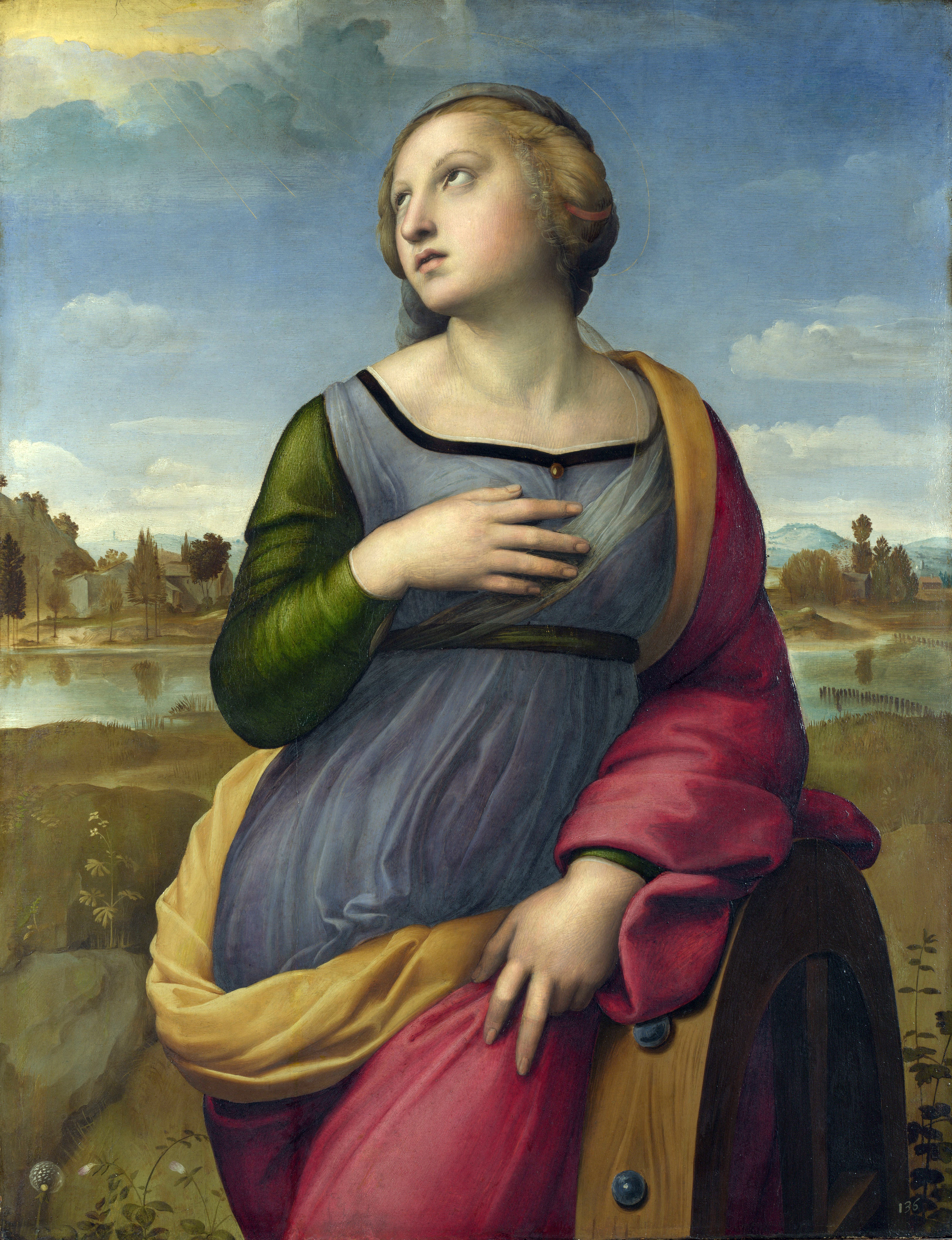
- Artist: Raphael
- Year: c. 1507–1509
- Medium: oil on wood
- Dimensions: 72.2 cm × 55.7 cm (28.4 in × 21.9 in)
- Location: National Gallery, London

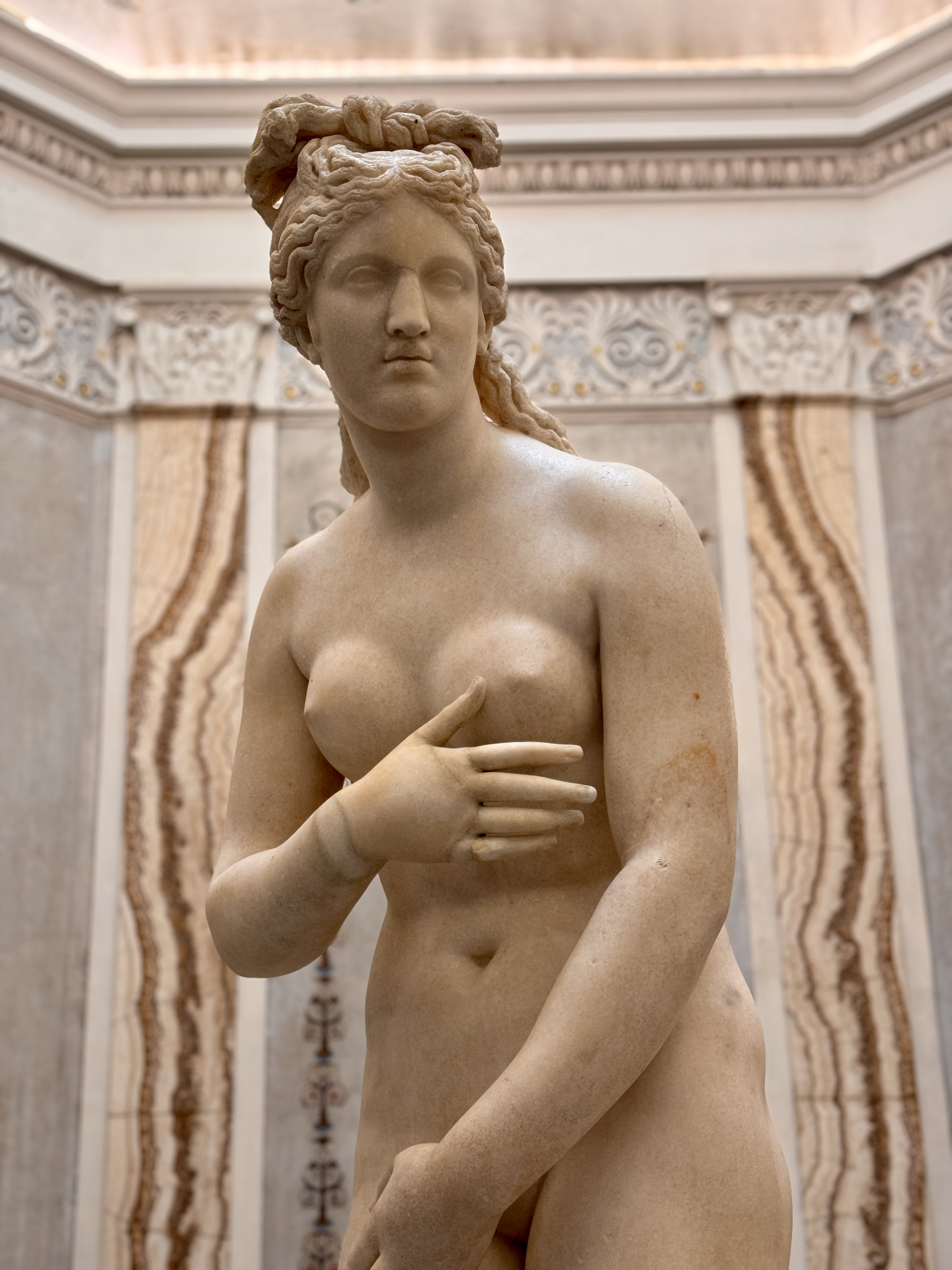
The Captoline Venus, one of several versions of the Venus pudica, thought to be a possible reference for Raphael's painting

Saint Catherine of Alexandria is a painting by the Italian Renaissance artist Raphael. In the painting, Catherine of Alexandria is looking upward in ecstasy and leaning on a wheel, an allusion to the breaking wheel (or Catherine wheel) of her martyrdom.

It was painted c. 1507–1509, towards the end of Raphael's sojourn in Florence, and shows the young artist in a transitional phase. The depiction of religious passion in the painting is still reminiscent of Pietro Perugino, but the graceful contrapposto of Catherine's pose is typical of the influence of Leonardo da Vinci on Raphael, and is believed to be an echo of Leonardo's lost painting Leda and the Swan.

It is now in the National Gallery, London.

== Subject and interpretation ==
The central figure in this painting is the fourth-century princess, Saint Catherine of Alexandria, standing in front of a rural landscape. She converted to Christianity after an encounter with a desert hermit and experienced a vision of mystic marriage to Christ. After she refused to renounce her faith, Emperor Maxentius planned to torture her by binding her to a wheel. However, a thunderbolt destroyed the wheel before he could do so, and Maxentius instead chose to behead her; the wheel in the bottom right corner, which she rests on, serves as a reference to this event. This wheel often appears in other artistic representations of Saint Catherine as well, from the thirteenth-century onwards. Raphael did not include other symbols associated with the saint in this portrait, such as a sword or palm leaf, which represent her knowledge.

Raphael's depiction of Saint Catherine highlights her sense of ecstasy. Golden light radiates from the top left corner of the canvas onto her face, emphasizing her connection to God. Likewise, she faces upwards, with parted lips and her hand over her heart, as Raphael attempted to capture a moment of divine bliss. Her graceful pose also bares resemblance to statues from Antiquity, such as a Venus pudica or a classical Muse.

The painting places Catherine in a peaceful rural setting; she stands in front of blue skies, hills, and trees, which the body of water to her left reflects. This tranquil landscape separates her from the violent events surrounding her death. In the foreground, Raphael painted small flowers, including a dandelion in the bottom left corner of the canvas. Some painters from Germany and the Netherlands included dandelions in their representations of Jesus's Crucifixion. Thus, the dandelion in Raphael's Saint Catherine of Alexandria may similarly serve as a symbol of Christian grief or Christ's passion.

== Painting materials and technique ==
Raphael employed pigments such as natural ultramarine, madder lake, ochres and lead-tin yellow in painting Saint Catherine's gown. An X-ray photograph of the painting revealed that Raphael used semi-transparent paint with low lead content for the flesh tones, while employing paint with higher lead content for the more vibrant dress, landscape and sky. He also mixed finely powdered glass into several of the pigments to accelerate the drying of the oil paints.

An infrared photograph taken of the work revealed a free-hand drawing of Saint Catherine done initially by Raphael beneath the layers of paint. Infrared reflectography also uncovered traces of pouncing along the contours of Saint Catherine’s right shoulder and along the outlines of her sleeves, originating from the cartoon sketch of the portrait.

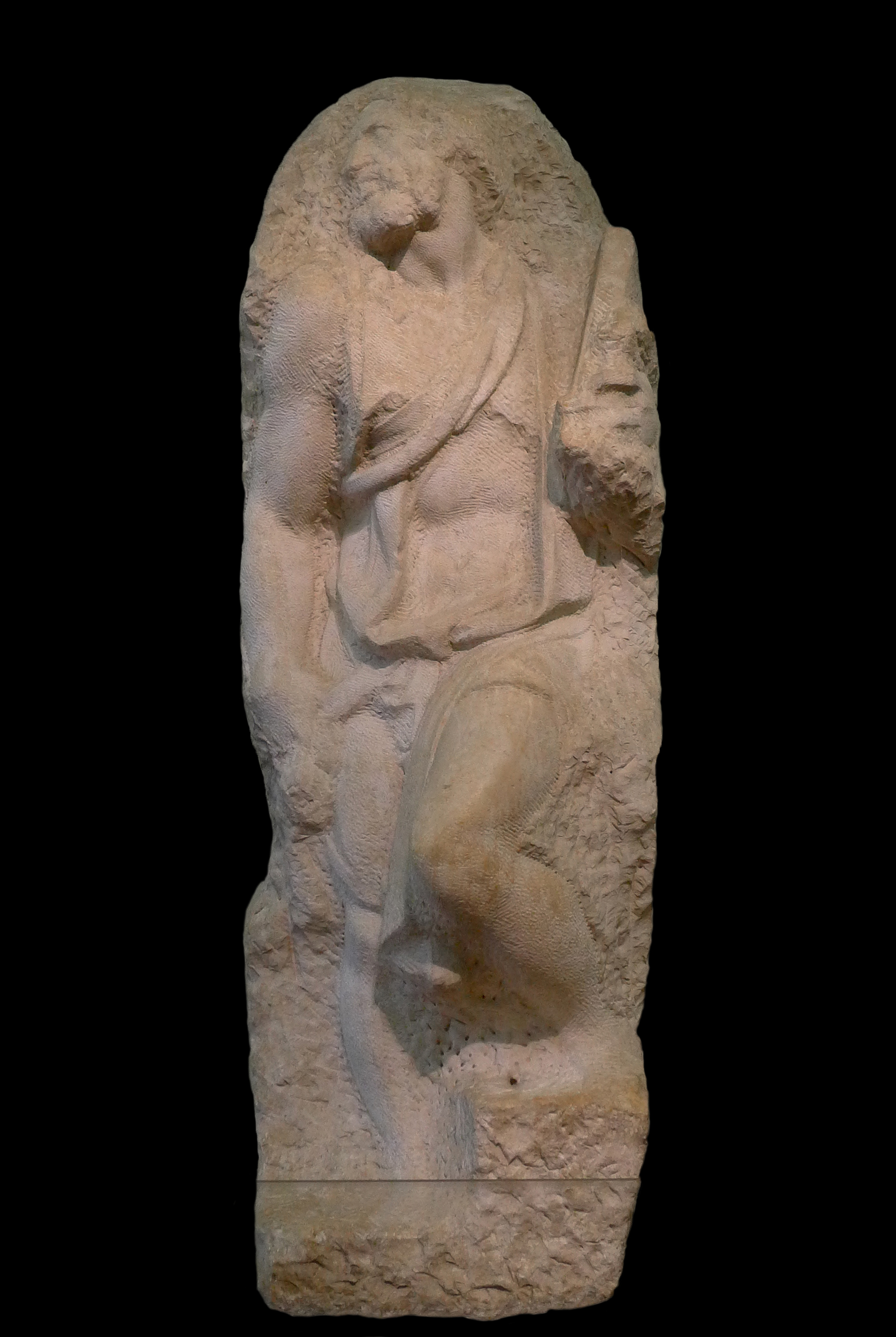
Michelangelo's marble sculpture of Saint Matthew that served as an inspiration for Saint Catherine's pose.

Raphael emphasized the upper parts of the Saint’s body. He portrayed Saint Catherine in a contrapposto pose and with an intense twisting of her torso as her head is turned over her right shoulder to gaze up at the sky. Her sculptural form and the foreshortening Raphael employed to convey her upturned head are derived from Michelangelo's Saint Matthew.

This painting is influenced by both classical and Italian Renaissance works. Saint Catherine’s graceful pose evokes the form of classical statues such as the Venus pudica. Raphael also drew inspiration from Italian Renaissance painter Pietro Perugino, incorporating elements such as landscapes, flowers, the contrapposto pose, rich, saturated colors, and hatched modeling to create shadows. The painting draws from composition and techniques of additional works from the Italian Renaissance, such as Leonardo’s Leda and the Swan and Michelangelo’s Saint Matthew.

== Initial sketches and cartoon (1507) ==
Three studies and one cartoon for Raphael's Saint Catherine of Alexandria have survived. Today, the 1507 cartoon is in the Louvre in Paris. Of Raphael's sketches depicting scenes about or related to this painting, the cartoon most closely resembles the painting that exists today. The figure of St. Catherine holds a similar pose in both works. In both the painting and the cartoon, St. Catherine holds her right hand to her breast. Her left hand rests on her thigh, her fingers digging into the fabric of her robe. Her left elbow rests on the wheel to her side, a visual reminder of her martyrdom and resilience. However, the cartoon differs from the completed painting in that the background was left blank.

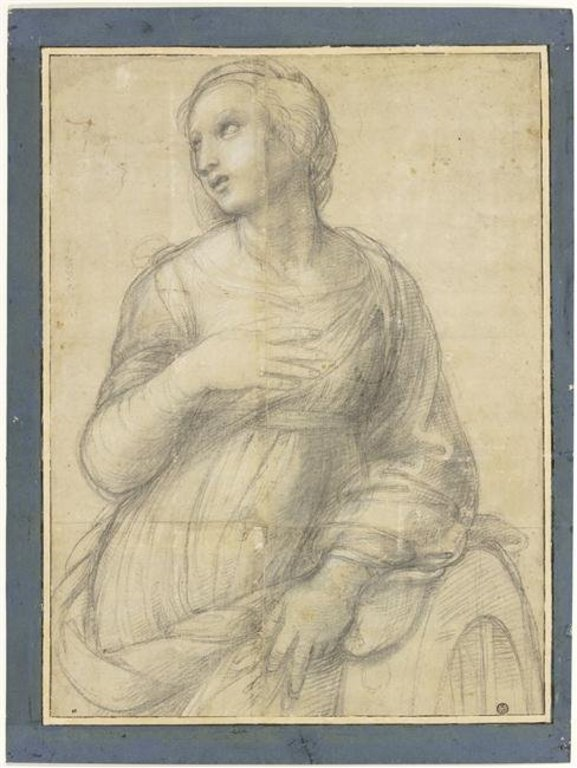
1507 Cartoon by Raphael for Saint Catherine of Alexandria.

German art historian Jürg Meyer zur Capellen noted that x-ray analysis of the completed painting reveals a "free-hand underdrawing" rather than a design transferred from the cartoon. Meyer zur Capellen used the similarities in the pose, composition, and depth of detail between the painting and cartoon, as well as the lack of transferred material from the cartoon to the painting surface, to suggest that Raphael copied the design onto the panel free-hand, using the cartoon as a reference. Later infrared imaging, however, revealed some evidence of pouncing, challenging the idea that Raphael sketched on the canvas entirely freehand.

Art historian and curator Hugo Chapman writes that the rough, loose strokes of charcoal on the cartoon are due to Raphael studying Leonardo da Vinci's cartoon techniques. Raphael was inspired by Leonardo's use of chiaroscuro and sfumato in his cartoons, and Raphael explored these techniques to create a guide to how he would depict the lighting in the finished painting.

== See also ==
- List of paintings by Raphael
- Saint Catherine (Caravaggio)
