= Saint Catherine of Alexandria (Caravaggio) =

Painting by Caravaggio

- Santa Caterina d'Alessandria (Italian)
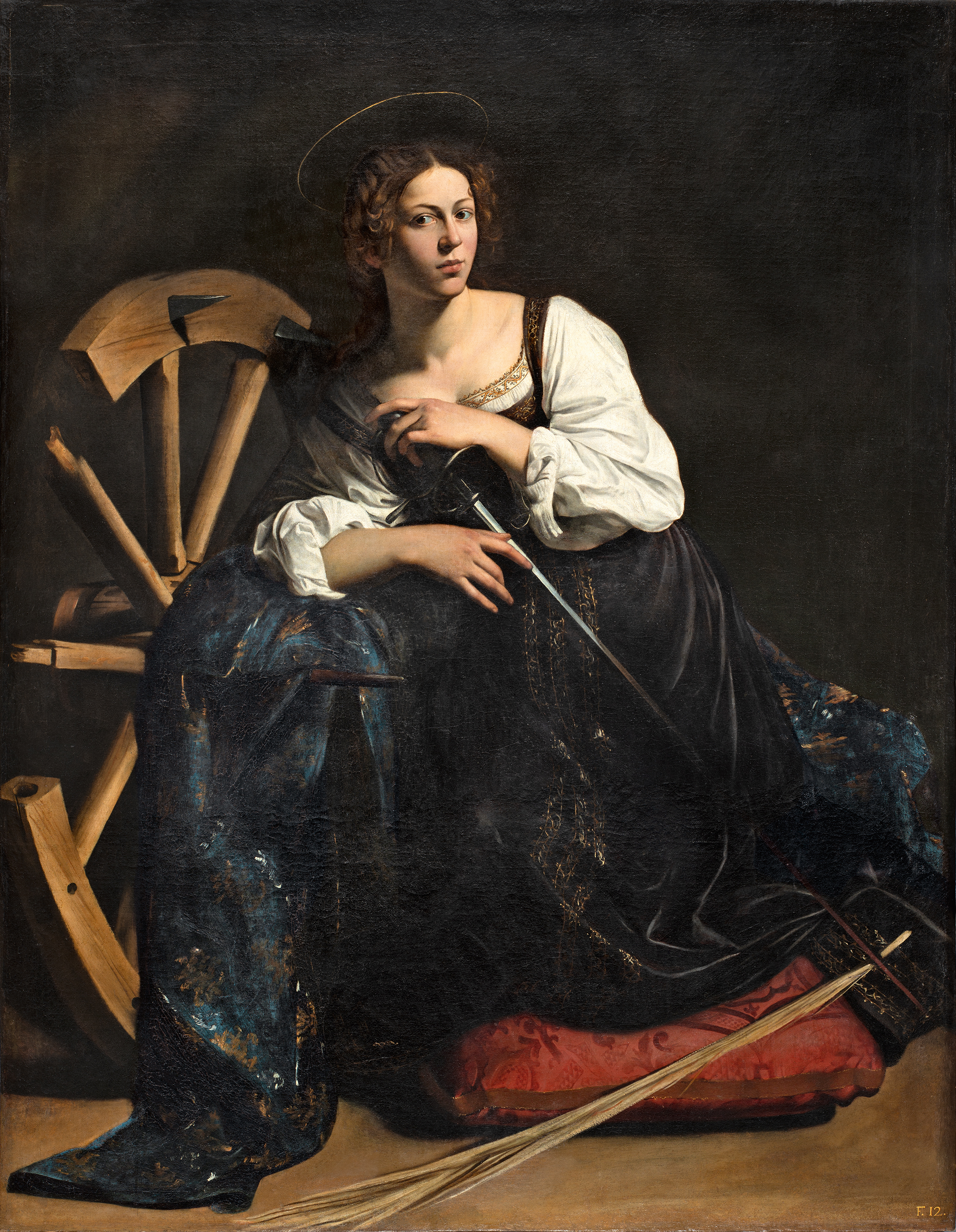
- Artist: Caravaggio
- Year: c. 1598
- Medium: Oil on canvas
- Dimensions: 173 cm × 133 cm (68 in × 52 in)
- Location: Thyssen-Bornemisza Museum, Madrid

Saint Catherine of Alexandria is an oil painting by the Italian Baroque master Caravaggio, from c. 1593. It is held at the Thyssen-Bornemisza Museum, in Madrid.

== History and description ==
The painting was part of the collection of Cardinal Francesco Maria del Monte, where it was cataloged in 1627. The saint, together with Mary Magdelene, were among the Cardinal's favorites.

According to Alessandro Zuccari, it was painted on the suggestion of the Cardinal when Caravaggio was living with him in the Palazzo Madama.

As the model for the saint, Caravaggio controversially chose Fillide Melandroni, a well known Roman courtesan. Fillide would again model for him in Martha and Mary Magdalene, Judith Beheading Holofernes, and in a single portrait burned in Berlin during World War II.

== Story of St. Catherine ==
Saint Catherine of Alexandria was a popular figure in Catholic iconography. Her qualities are supposed to be those of beauty, fearlessness, virginity, and intelligence. She was of noble origins, and dedicated herself as a Christian after having a vision. At the age of 18, she confronted the Roman Emperor Maximus (presumably this refers to Galerius Maximianus), debated his pagan philosophers, and succeeded in converting many of them to Christianity. Imprisoned by the Emperor, she converted his empress Valeria Maximilla and the leader of his armies. Maximus executed her converts, including the Empress, and ordered that Catherine herself be put to death on a spiked wheel. The wheel reportedly shattered the moment Catherine touched it. Maximus then had her beheaded.

She became patron saint of libraries and librarians, as well as teachers, archivists, and all those associated with wisdom and teaching, and all those whose livelihoods depended upon wheels. The year of her martyrdom was traditionally held to have been 305 (the year of a major persecution of Christians under Galerius), and her feast day was celebrated on 25 November.

In 1969, the Church removed her from the calendar of saints, persuaded by the overwhelming opinion of historians that Catherine had probably never existed. By 2002, while the majority of historians had not changed their minds, the Church had, and she was reinstated.

== See also ==
- Saint Catherine of Alexandria (Raphael)
- List of paintings by Caravaggio
