= Penitent Magdalene (Caravaggio) =

Painting by Caravaggio

- Maddalena penitente (Italian)
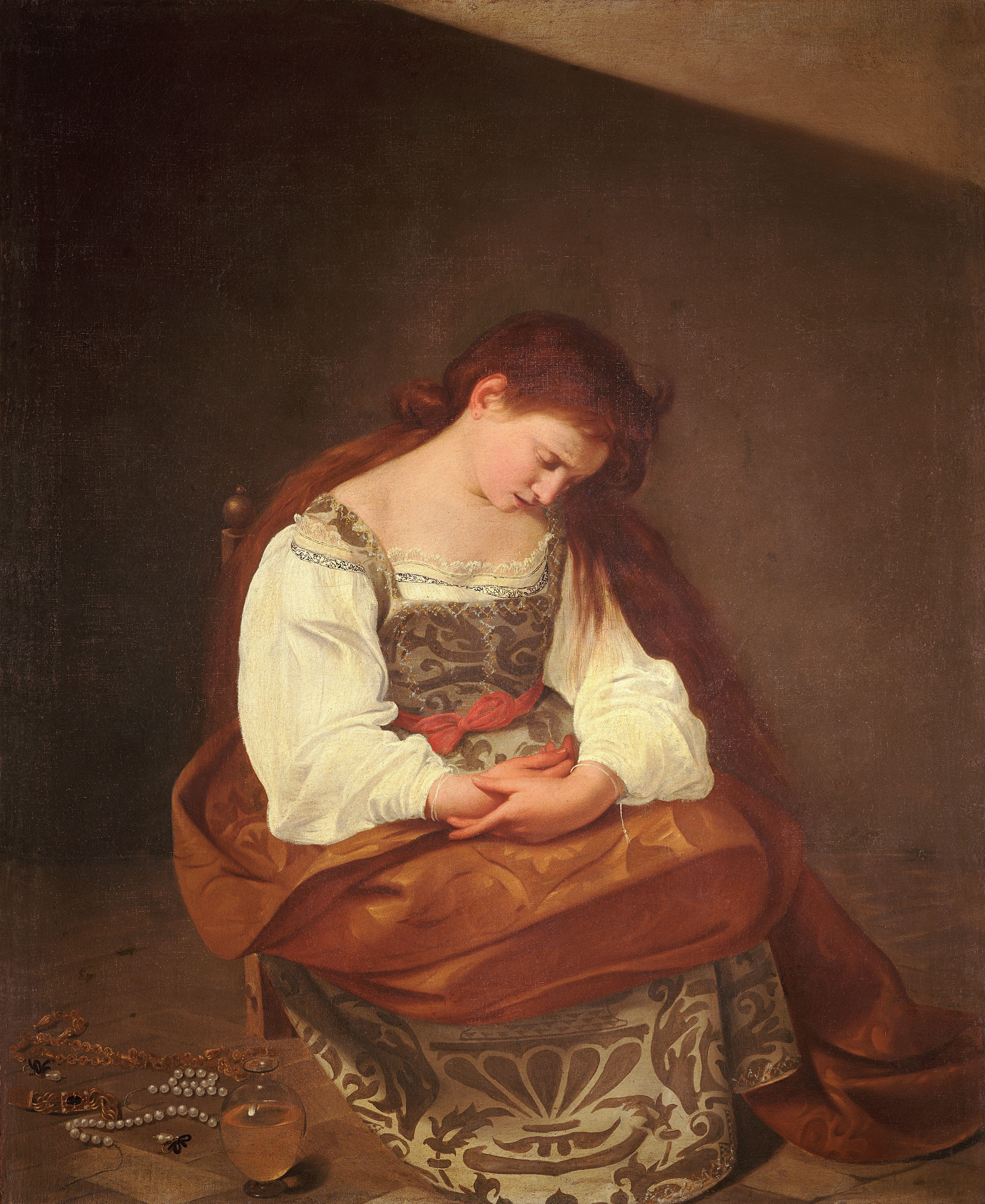
- Artist: Caravaggio
- Year: c. 1594–1595
- Medium: Oil on canvas
- Dimensions: 122.5 cm × 98.5 cm (48.2 in × 38.8 in)
- Location: Doria Pamphilj Gallery; Rome

Penitent Magdalene (also called Repentant Madalene) is a 16th-century oil on canvas painting by Italian Baroque painter Caravaggio. The painting portrays a repentant Mary Magdalene bowed in penitent sorrow as she leaves behind her dissolute life, its trappings abandoned beside her. At the time of its completion, ca. 1594–1595, the painting was unconventional for its contemporary realism and departure from traditional Magdalene iconography. It has invited both criticism and praise, with speculation even into the 21st century as to Caravaggio's intentions. The work hangs in the Doria Pamphilj Gallery in Rome.

== Composition ==
The painting depicts a young brunette, squatting or kneeling on a low chair, with her hands cradled in her lap. By her side is a collection of jewelry and a stoppered bottle of liquid, nearly three-quarters full. Her gaze is averted from the viewer, her head turned downward in a position that has been compared to traditional portrayals of the crucified Jesus Christ. A single tear runs down one cheek to the side of her nose.

== History ==
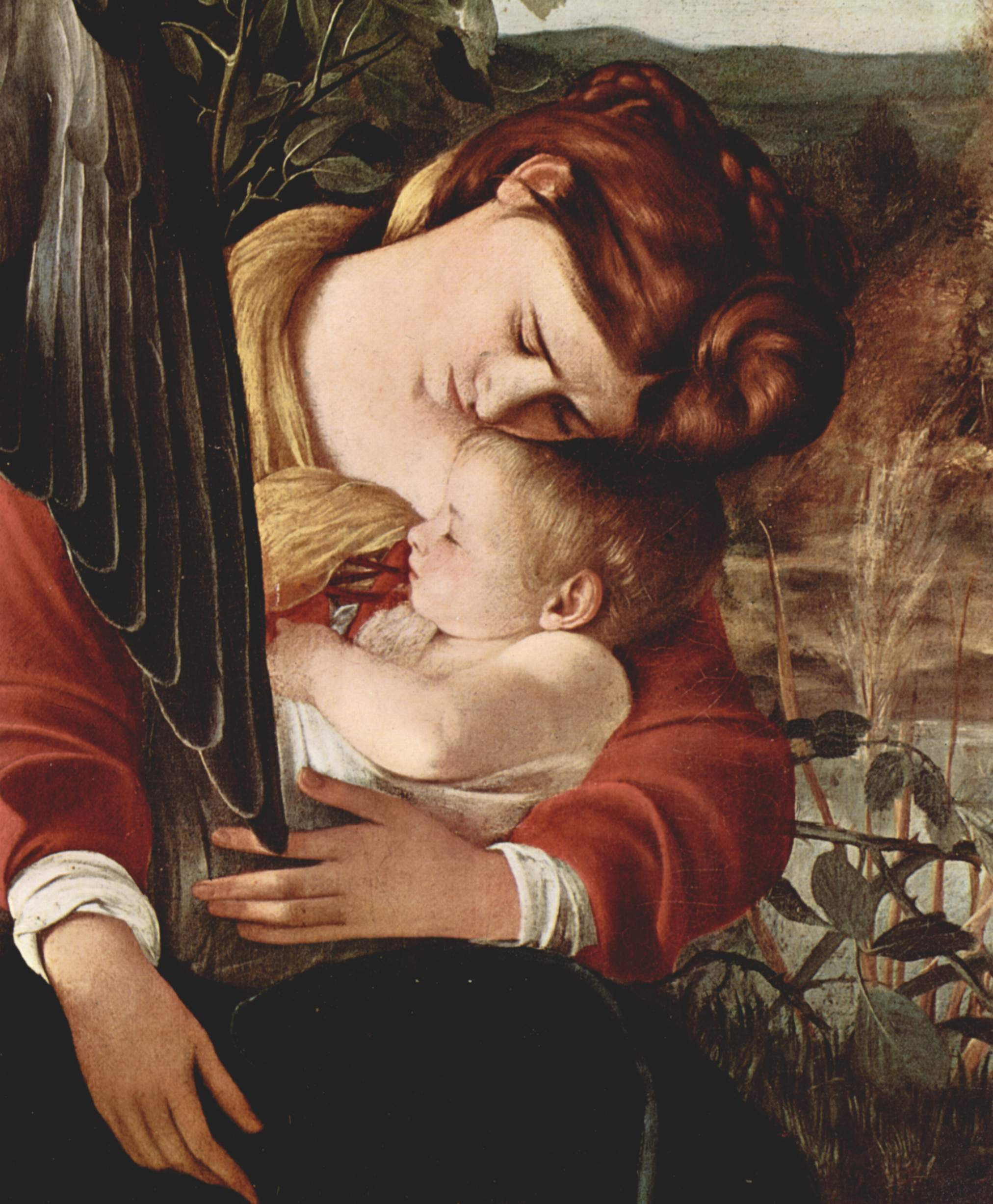
The same model may have served as the Virgin Mary in Rest on the Flight into Egypt.

The painting was completed ca. 1594–1595, during which time Caravaggio was residing with Giuseppe Cesari and Fantin Petrignani. The painting was almost certainly commissioned by Pietro Vittrice, guardaroba of Pope Gregory XIII. Caravaggio was known to have used several prostitutes as models for his works, and historians have speculated that Anna Bianchini is featured in this painting. Contemporary biographers indicate that Bianchini may also have featured in Caravaggio's Death of the Virgin, Conversion of the Magdalen (as Martha) and Rest on the Flight into Egypt (as the Virgin Mary). It may be the first religious painting ever completed by Caravaggio.

The painting represents a departure from the standard paintings of the penitent Mary Magdalene of Caravaggio's day, both in portraying her in contemporary clothing and, in the words of biographer John Varriano (2006), avoiding "the pathos and languid sensuality" with which the subject was generally treated. Indeed, most of the many depictions of the subject in art showed the Magdalen with no clothing at all, as in Titian's painting of 1533, it having fallen apart during the thirty years she spent, according to medieval legend, repenting in the desert after the Ascension of Jesus. It was Caravaggio's departure into realism that shocked his original audience; according to Hilary Spurling in The New York Times Book Reviews (2001), "contemporaries complained that his Mary Magdalene looked like the girl next door drying her hair alone at home on her night in." Decades after the painting's completion, 17th-century art biographer Gian Pietro Bellori opined that Caravaggio had feigned religious imagery by adding items associated with Mary Magdalene—a carafe of oil and discarded jewelry—to an otherwise modern genre scene. But Jesuit poet Giuseppe Silos evidently did not regard the work as feigned spirituality. Rather, in his Pinacotheca sive Romana pictura et sculptura, published in 1673, he praised it and its painter elaborately:

We can see the silent remorse hidden in her conscience, and in the depths of her heart she is burned by a secret flame. Certainly Caravaggio's colors are so lively as to reveal even her most intimate sentiments. A rare bird is that painter who can so clearly expose in a mere image that which is hidden in the blind darkness of the conscience.

In his controversial contemporary biography M (2001), Peter Robb suggested that the realism of the piece and the subtle hints of violence he perceived—broken pearls and the subject's swollen face and hands—might suggest a political dimension, a commentary on the mistreatment of courtesans in Caravaggio's time by police in Rome. Based on records from Bianchini's life, Robb speculates that Bianchini might have been publicly whipped in the custom of the day, the ointment in the jar her treatment for this, her injury Caravaggio's inspiration.

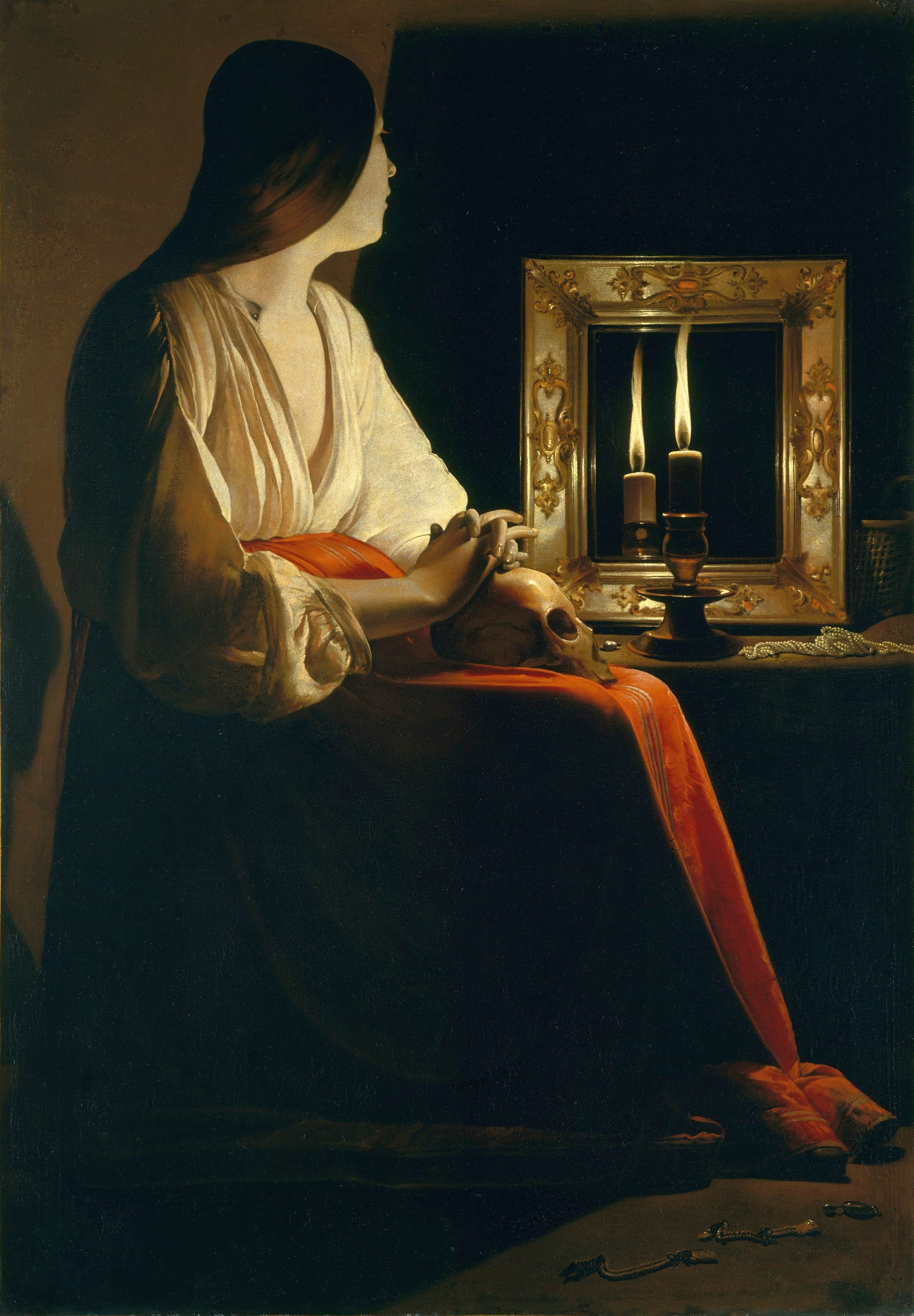
Georges de La Tour based his own Penitent Magdalen (c. 1638–1643) on Caravaggio's work.

Whatever may have inspired Caravaggio's Magdalene, his piece may have inspired Georges de La Tour to produce several versions of the subject. De la Tour dramatically changed the angle of his painting. Although the Magdalene remains seated, face averted, her hands clasped on her lap, she is strongly backlit by a candle set before a mirror, and cradles a skull on her lap.

== See also ==
- List of paintings by Caravaggio
