= Rest on the Flight into Egypt (Caravaggio) =

Painting by Caravaggio

- Riposo durante la fuga in Egitto (Italian)
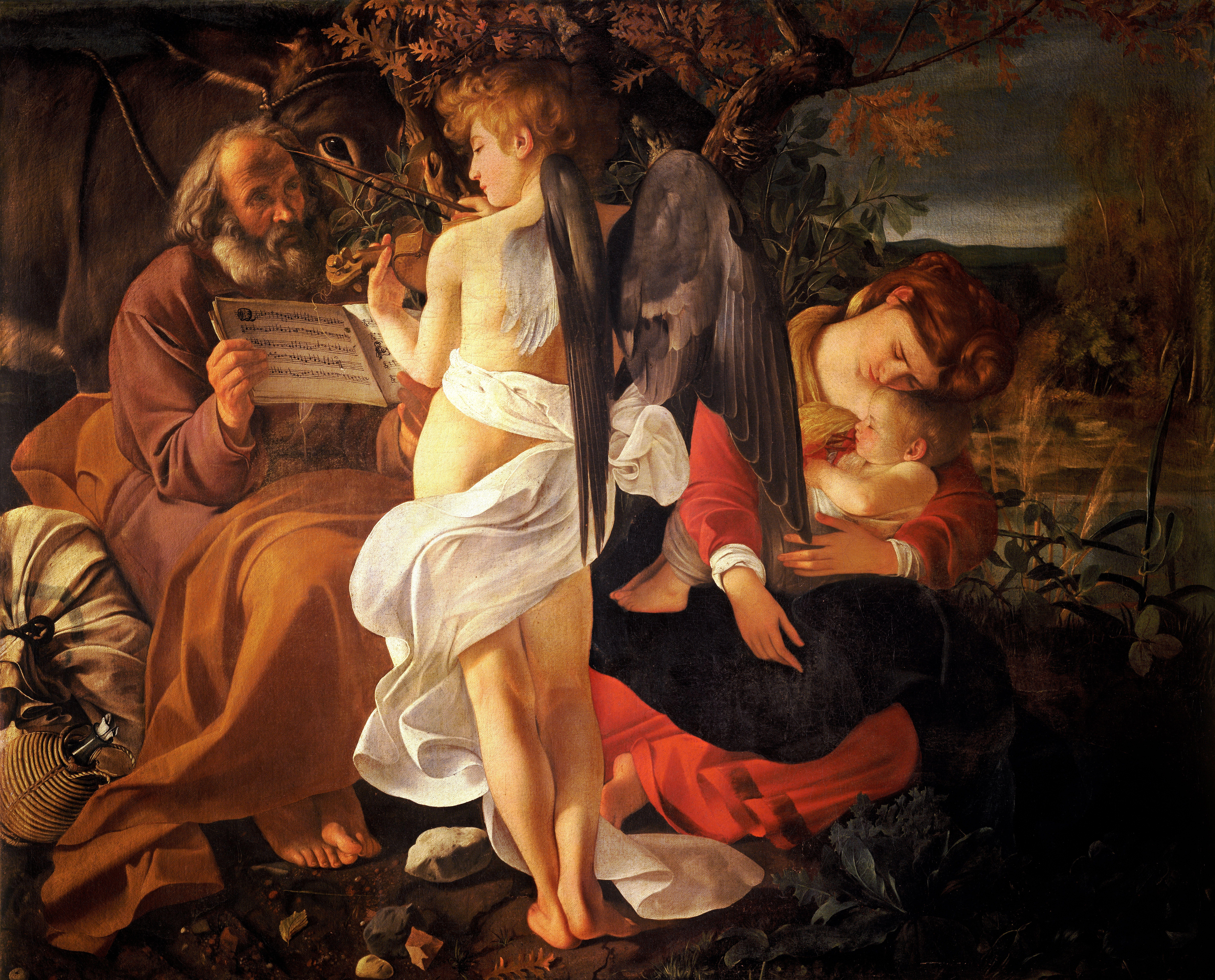
- Artist: Caravaggio
- Year: c. 1597
- Medium: Oil on canvas
- Dimensions: 135.5 cm × 166.5 cm (53.3 in × 65.6 in)
- Location: Doria Pamphilj Gallery; Rome

Rest on the Flight into Egypt (c. 1597 creation) is a painting by the Italian Baroque master Michelangelo Merisi da Caravaggio, in the Doria Pamphilj Gallery, Rome. The Rest on the Flight into Egypt, like the Flight into Egypt, was a popular subject in art, but Caravaggio's composition, with an angel playing the viol to the Holy Family, is unusual.

== Subject matter ==
The scene is based not on any incident in the Bible itself, but on a body of tales or legends that had grown up in the early Middle Ages around the Bible story of the Holy Family fleeing into Egypt for refuge on being warned that Herod the Great was seeking to kill the Christ Child. According to the legend, Joseph and Mary paused on the flight in a grove of trees; the Holy Child ordered the trees to bend down so that Joseph could take fruit from them, and then ordered a spring of water to gush forth from the roots so that his parents could quench their thirst. This basic story acquired many extra details during the centuries.

Caravaggio shows Mary asleep with the infant Jesus, while Joseph holds a manuscript for an angel who is playing a hymn to Mary on the viol.

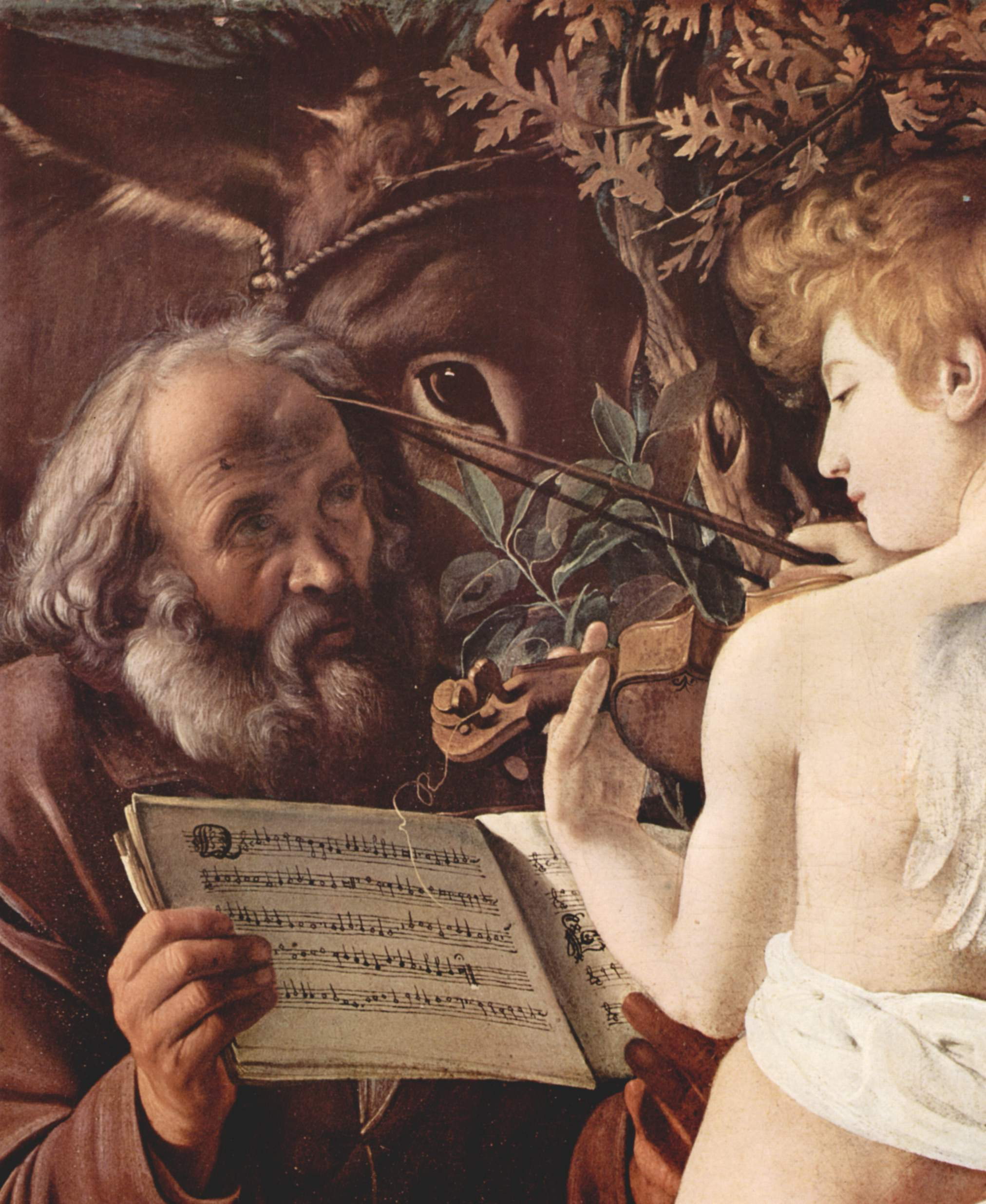
Flight into Egypt (detail).

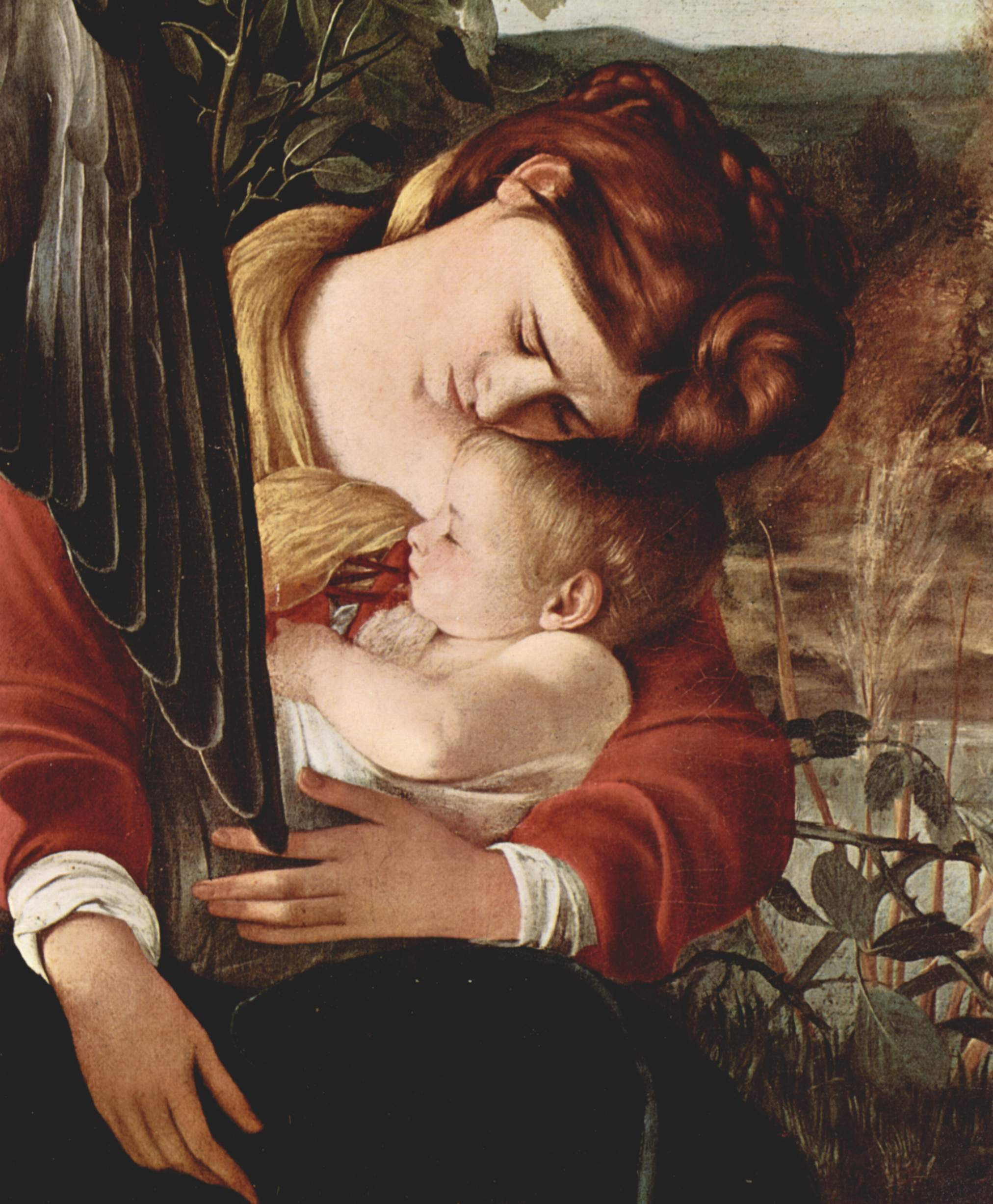
Flight into Egypt (detail).

== Date ==
The date of the painting is disputed. According to Caravaggio's contemporary Giulio Mancini, this painting and the Penitent Magdalene, together with an unidentified painting of Saint John the Evangelist, was done while Caravaggio was staying with Monsignor Fantino Petrignani, shortly after leaving the workshop of Giuseppe Cesari. This probably happened in January 1594.

However, there are problems with accepting Mancini's statement. To begin, none of these three works were listed in Petragnani's inventory of 1600, although it is possible that they could have been painted for another patron. More seriously, the painting has an obvious and direct compositional source in Annibale Carracci's The Choice of Hercules, which was completed early in 1596 and widely admired: the pose of Caravaggio's angel, for example, is closely based on that of Carracci's figure of Vice.

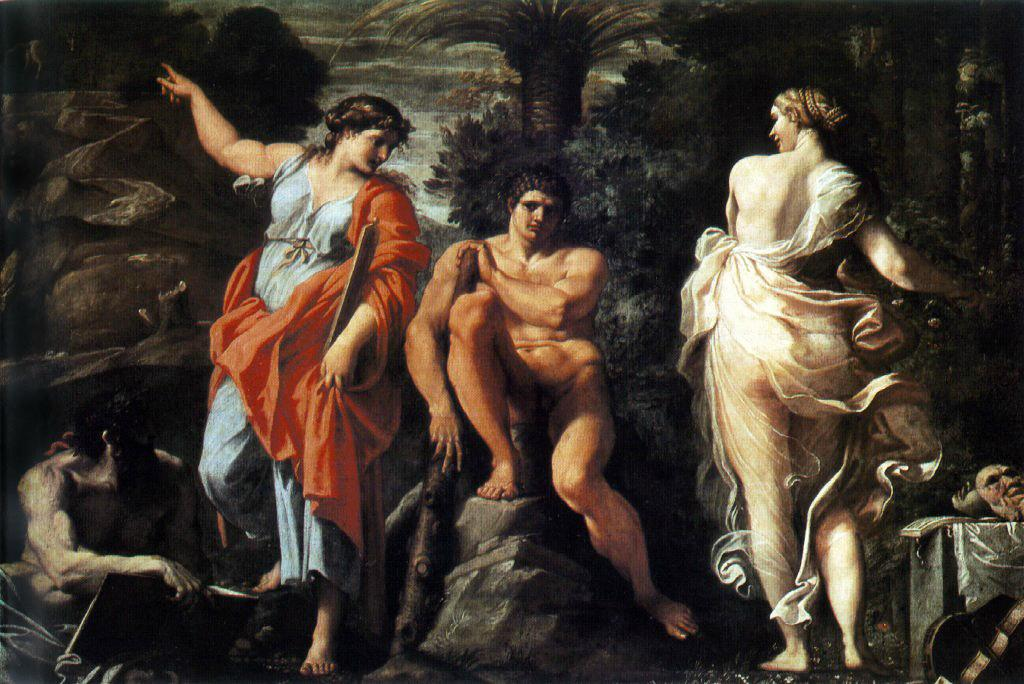
Annibale Carracci, The Judgement of Hercules, 1596. The sensuous figure of Vice seems to have directly influenced the pose adopted for Caravaggio's angel.

While John Gash (2003) accepts Mancini's testimony, others, including Peter Robb and Helen Langdon (both 1998), have raised the possibility that it was painted for Cardinal Francesco Maria del Monte, who made Caravaggio in effect his household artist from about 1595 or 1596. The sophisticated treatment is appropriate for the Cardinal's intellectual tastes and interests (the music held by Joseph is a motet by the Flemish composer Noel Bauldeweyn, with a text from the Song of Songs dedicated to the Madonna, Quam pulchra es, "How beautiful you are"), and it is unlikely that the artist would embark on a work like this other than as a direct commission.

== Style ==
This was the first large-scale work done by Caravaggio, and is compositionally more ambitious and more successful than The Musicians, of about 1595. It is also one of the very rare landscapes from this artist who seems always to have been painting in a prison cell, a room at a tavern, or at night – one critic has joked that all the sky in all Caravaggio's 80-odd works would add up to a few square centimeters of paint. The painting was apparently sold to the Pamphilj by the early 17th century. Caravaggio's Lombard and Venetian heritage are evident in the treatment of the landscape and in the luminous tonalities. Like most depictions of the flight to Egypt this is a peaceful moment, one in which the scenery is to be enjoyed, more gardenscape than landscape. The luminous figure of the adolescent angel, at once serene and sensuous, holds the centre of the group. The mother and child grouping, one of many that Caravaggio would paint, is comparable in its delicacy and realism to the best that the thousands in the canon can offer.

== Models ==
One of the great pastimes of Caravaggio scholars is identifying his models. Much progress has been made, but the following should be regarded as tentative only, as Caravaggio left few clues. Mary appears to be the same girl who appears as Mary Magdalen in the Penitent Magdalene of about 1597, also in the Doria-Pamphilj Gallery. The aged Joseph appears similar to the elderly saints in The Inspiration of Saint Matthew of 1602 and, less clearly, Saint Jerome in Meditation of about 1605. Some critics have identified the boy-angel with the ingenuous victim of cheats on the left of Cardsharps, while others have seen a similarity with the profile of the boy cheating him instead.

== See also ==
- List of paintings by Caravaggio

== References and sources ==
- Gash, John (2003). Caravaggio. ISBN 1-904449-22-0.
- Hibbard, Howard (1983). Caravaggio. Harper & Row. ISBN 0-06-430128-1.
- Langdon, Helen (1998). Caravaggio: A Life. ISBN 0-374-11894-9.
- Robb, Peter (1998). M. ISBN 0-312-27474-2.
