= Bacchus (Caravaggio) =

Painting by Caravaggio

- Bacco (Italian)
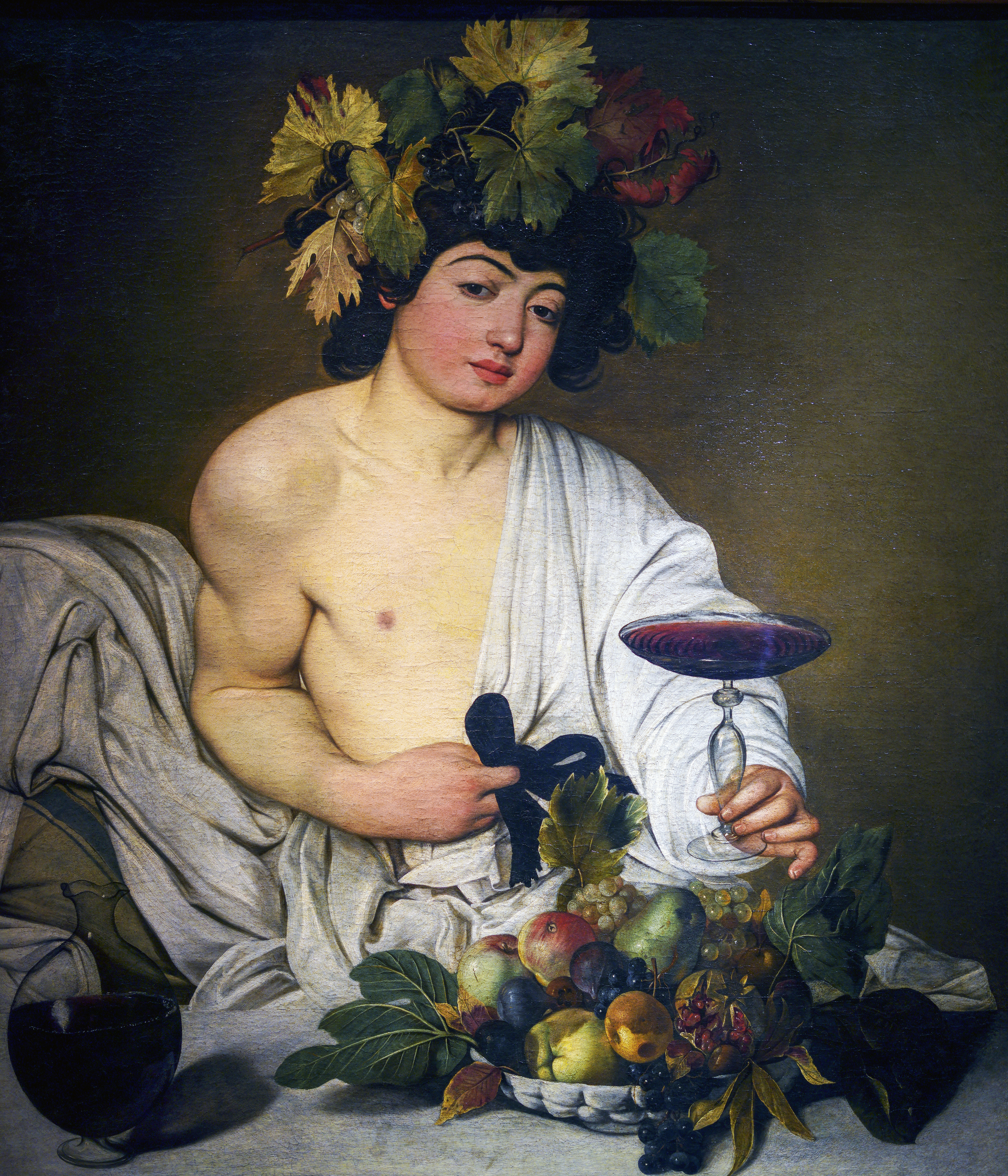
- Artist: Caravaggio
- Year: c. 1596
- Medium: oil on canvas
- Dimensions: 95 cm × 85 cm (37 in × 33 in)
- Location: Uffizi, Florence

Bacchus (c. 1596) is an oil painting by Italian Baroque master Michelangelo Merisi da Caravaggio (1571–1610) commissioned by Cardinal Francesco Maria del Monte. The painting shows a youthful Bacchus reclining in classical fashion with grapes and vine leaves in his hair, fingering the drawstring of his loosely draped robe. On a stone table in front of him is a bowl of fruit and a large carafe of red wine. He holds out a shallow goblet of the same wine, inviting the viewer to join him. The painting is currently held in the Uffizi Gallery in Florence.

== Subject matter ==
Bacchus, also known as Dionysus, was the Greek god of wine, inebriation, fertility and theater. He is known to be joyous and kind to those who admire him, yet cruel and mischievous to those who cross him. Scenes from Greek mythology were often found in the private spaces of aristocrats. Classical images were used to depict the patron’s interests or triumphs. The patron may have valued the finer things in life and saw Bacchus as the perfect allegory for wealth and excess.

== Interpretation ==
Caravaggio is not only attempting to depict Bacchus, but also a boy dressed up as Bacchus. It Is a sensual scene inviting the viewer to succumb to their carnal desires. The boy is youthful and handsome, round yet muscular. He barely makes an attempt to keep his robes on as he coaxes the viewer to join him with a suggestive look in his eye. In the basket there is a bursting pomegranate as well as a rotting apple. Caravaggio uses these elements together to hint at the Vanitas theme. Youth and pleasure are fleeting. Everything must succumb to death and rot. It is also possible that the rotting apple simply represents fermentation, suggesting not only that fermentation is literally rot, but also that improper methods of fermentation lead to the personification of rot.

The homoeroticism felt in the painting could be Caravaggio alluding to his own romantic feelings for the young model in the painting. Many of Caravaggio's patrons and fellow artists turned a blind eye to his behavior and continued to support his work. Art historian, Donald Posner, felt that the homoeroticism in the painting was actually alluding to Cardinal del Monte's sexuality and his relationships with the young boys that ran in his inner circle.

== Commission ==
Bacchus was painted shortly after Caravaggio joined the household of his first important patron, Cardinal del Monte, and reflects the humanist interests of the Cardinal's educated circle. Caravaggio moved into the Palazzo Madama in 1596 and remained a guest of the Cardinal for five years. Del Monte held a passion for the arts and requested multiple paintings from Caravaggio including Medusa. The Cardinal was a fan of classical Greek mythology and used allegorical images to emphasize his knowledge of art, music, and theater. Both Bacchus and Medusa were donated by the Cardinal to the Medici family and have remained in Florence ever since. Del Monte's early support and guidance brought wealth and recognition to Caravaggio, making him one his most important patrons.

== Model ==
The model for Bacchus might have actually been Caravaggio's pupil, Mario Minniti, whom he had used as a model in The Musicians, Boy with a Basket of Fruit, The Fortune Teller, Lute Player, and The Calling of Saint Matthew. There was speculation that Caravaggio and Minniti's relationship was that of a sexual nature. Paintings that he modeled for could be seen as having a homoerotic quality. Especially in Bacchus, the lounging model is inviting the viewer into the scene with a glass of wine and a basket of ripe fruits while his robe slips off. Caravaggio was known for staging scenes, including the models and painting them in costume, doing away with the need to sketch the scene from his mind before applying paint to canvas.

Some critics, such as Giovanni Baglione, believed that Caravaggio used himself as the model. During 1595 he would have been twenty-four and could have played up his youthful features for this work. Bacchus is offering of the wine with his left hand, despite the obvious effort this is causing the model. This has led to speculation that Caravaggio used a mirror to assist himself while working from life, doing away with the need for drawing. It is believed that Caravaggio was unable to paint the human figure without a model in front of him.

== Criticism ==
=== Giovanni Baglione ===
Painter and rival of Caravaggio, Giovanni Baglione believed that this image of Bacchus is actually a self portrait. He argues that Caravaggio positioned a mirror in front of himself while he painted the scene. Baglione is considered to be part of the Caravaggisti, a group of artists and art appreciators who followed Caravaggio and attempted to defend and even emulate his style. Though Baglione emulated Caravaggio's style, he hated him. He even wrote a scathing biography of Caravaggio. The two artists loathed each other and constantly accused each other of inappropriate behavior. It is thought that Baglione's hatred was a product of jealousy therefore leading him to accuse Caravaggio of being unable to paint portraits without a model. He claims that Caravaggio did not possess the talent to conjure up perfect beings in his mind and transfer them to canvas.

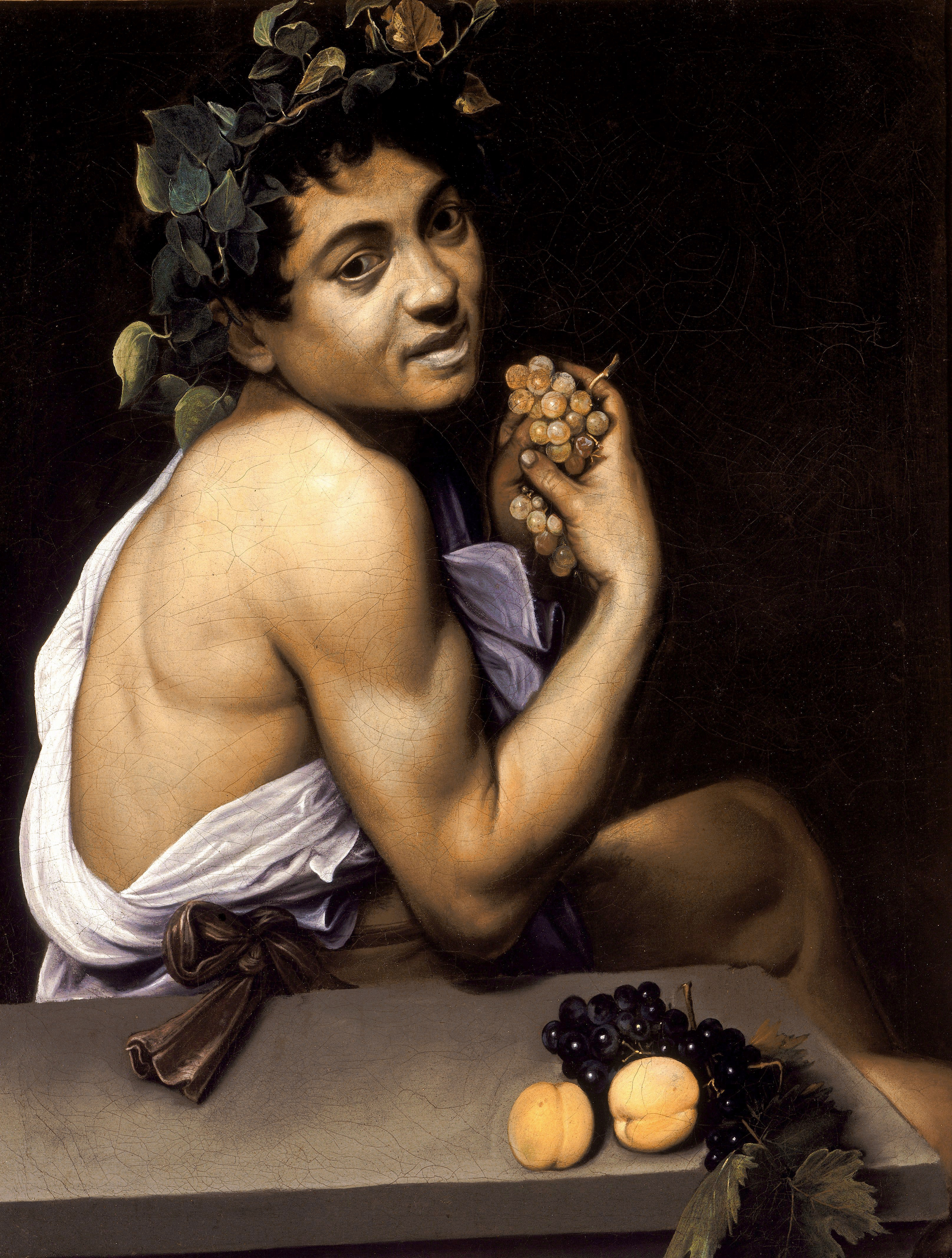
Caravaggio's Young Sick Bacchus

== Other versions ==
Young Sick Bacchus (c. 1593) is another image of Bacchus done by Caravaggio for the Borghese family. The model for this portrait is also believed to be the same model used in Bacchus (c. 1595). Unlike the later version, this version Bacchus' skin appears jaundiced and his body is positioned away from the viewer. Again, it is unclear if the model is Caravaggio himself or his pupil Mario Minniti. This version shows Caravaggio's interest in tenebrism. The background remains dark while the subject looks like they are under a spotlight, creating a dramatic effect forcing the viewer to focus on one aspect of the scene. Unlike the later Bacchus, this depiction focuses on the decay of Bacchus himself rather than the decay of decadence.

There is another version of Young Sick Bacchus by Caravaggio (c. 1593) at the Galleria Nazionale d'Arte Antica in Rome. The title is Self-portrait as Bacchus, but the image is almost the same as the Borghese version.

== See also ==
- List of paintings by Caravaggio
