= Boy Bitten by a Lizard =

Painting by Caravaggio, c. 1595

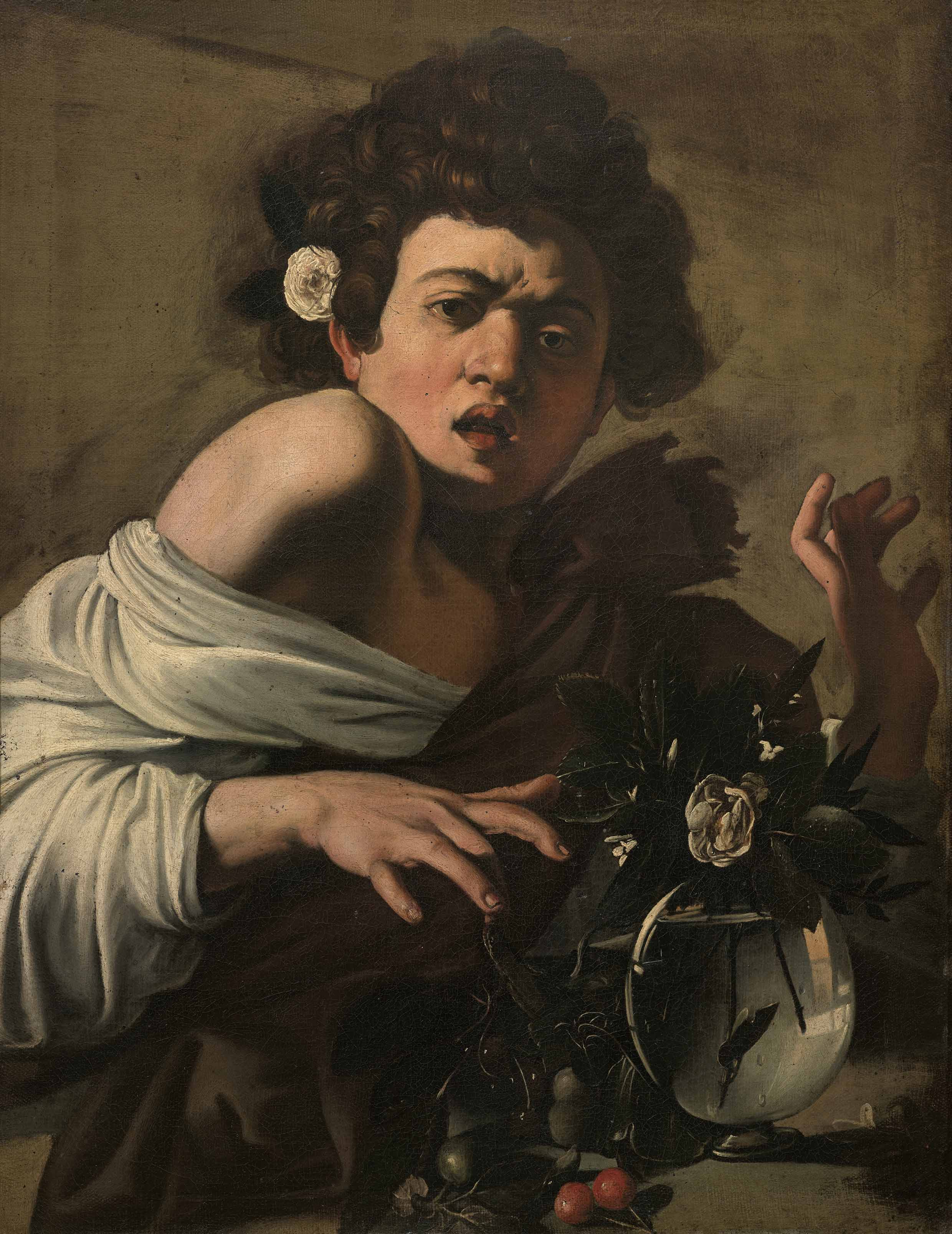
- Artist: Caravaggio
- Year: 1593–1594
- Medium: Oil on canvas
- Dimensions: 65 cm × 52 cm (26 in × 20 in)
- Location: Fondazione Roberto Longhi, Florence

Boy Bitten by a Lizard
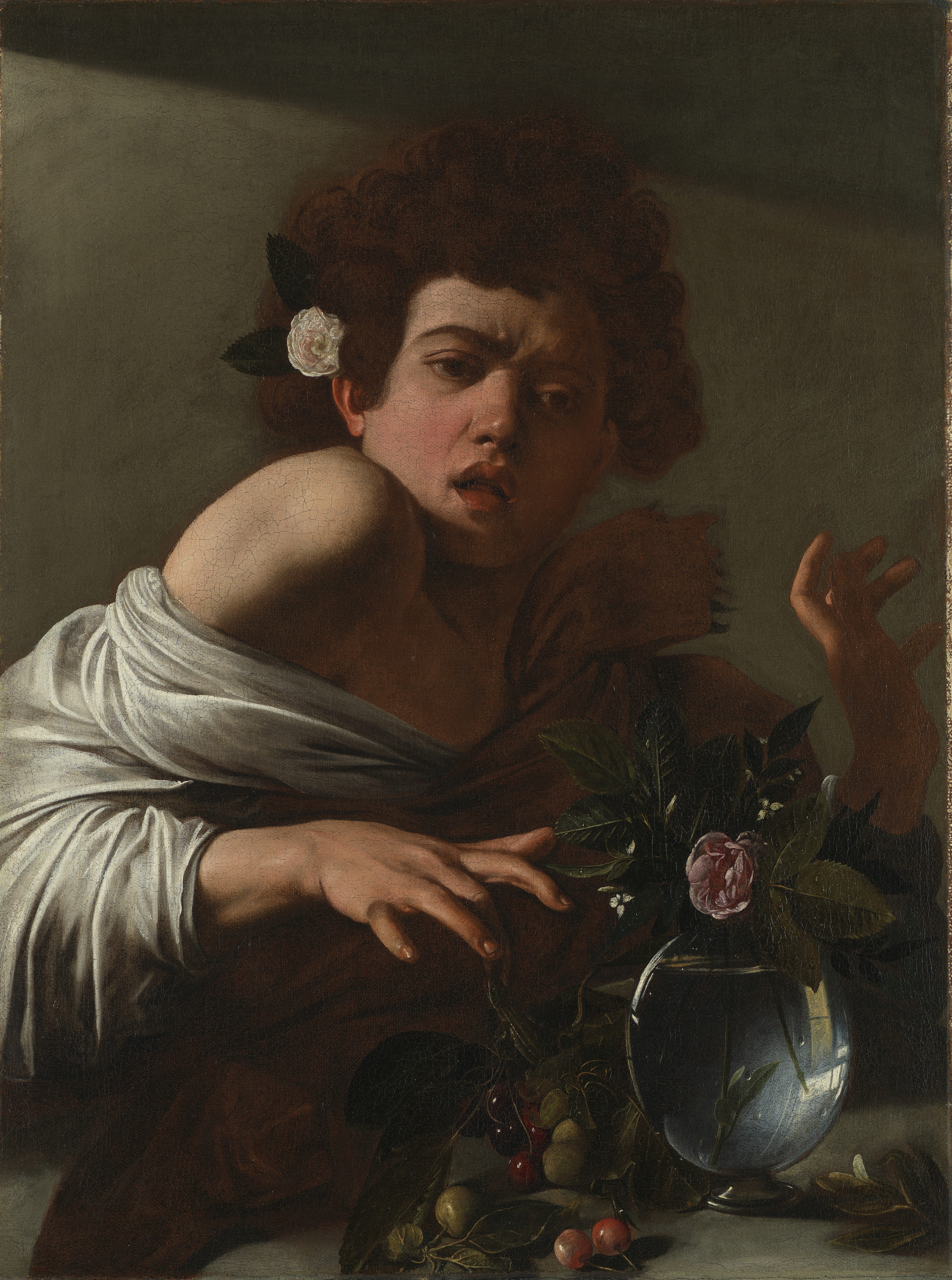
- Artist: Caravaggio
- Year: 1594–1596
- Medium: Oil on canvas
- Dimensions: 66 cm × 49.5 cm (26 in × 19.5 in)
- Location: National Gallery, London

Boy Bitten by a Lizard (Italian: Ragazzo morso da un ramarro) is a painting by the Italian Baroque painter Caravaggio. It exists in two versions, both believed to be authentic works of Caravaggio, one in the Fondazione Roberto Longhi in Florence, the other in the National Gallery, London.

== Date ==
Both versions are thought to date from the period 1594–1596. According to art historian Roberto Longhi, the latter end of this period seems more likely, given that the paintings have all the signs of the early works painted in the household of Caravaggio's sophisticated patron Cardinal Francesco Maria del Monte, and that Caravaggio did not enter the Cardinal's Palazzo Madama until some time in 1595.

== Identity of model ==
As with all of Caravaggio's early output, much remains conjectural, and the identity of the model has been debated. One theory is that the model was Mario Minniti, Caravaggio's companion and the model for several other paintings from the period; the bouffant, curly dark hair, and pursed lips look similar, but in other pictures such as Boy with a Basket of Fruit and The Fortune Teller Mario looks less effeminate.

Michael Fried has proposed instead that the painting is a disguised self-portrait of Caravaggio. Fried argues that the subject's hands – one stretched out, the other raised up – are in a similar position to those of a painter holding a palette while painting.

== Symbolism ==
According to Leonard J. Slatkes, the painting's symbolism likely derives from the Apollo Sauroktonos theme in which a poisonous salamander triumphs over the god, while the arrangement of various fruits suggests The Four Temperaments, with the salamander being the symbol of fire in Caravaggio's time. The salamander also had phallic connotations, and the painting might have been inspired by a Martial epigram: "Ad te reptanti, puer insidiose, lacertae Parce: cupit digitis illa perire tuis. (Spare this lizard crawling towards you, treacherous boy/It wants to die between your fingers)

== Style ==
The affected pose may have been the inevitable result of the experiment Caravaggio appears to have been undertaking here: observing and recording acute emotions – surprise and fear – in a situation where real surprise was impossible and where the pose had to be held for a considerable period. Critics of Caravaggio's insistence on painting only from life would later point out this limitation of his method: it lent itself to marvelously realistic (if theatrical) static compositions, but not to scenes involving movement and violence. It would only be in his late period, when he seems to have worked more from imagination, that Caravaggio would be able to completely overcome this problem. Nevertheless, Boy Bitten by a Lizard is an important work in the artist's early oeuvre precisely because it shows a way out from the airless stillness of very early works such as Boy Peeling a Fruit and Sick Bacchus, and even the implied violence but actual stasis of pieces such as Cardsharps.

== Influences ==
As was first suggested by Roberto Longhi, Caravaggio has probably borrowed the motif of biting a finger from a Boy Bitten by a Crab, a drawing by prominent Renaissance artist Sofonisba Anguissola.

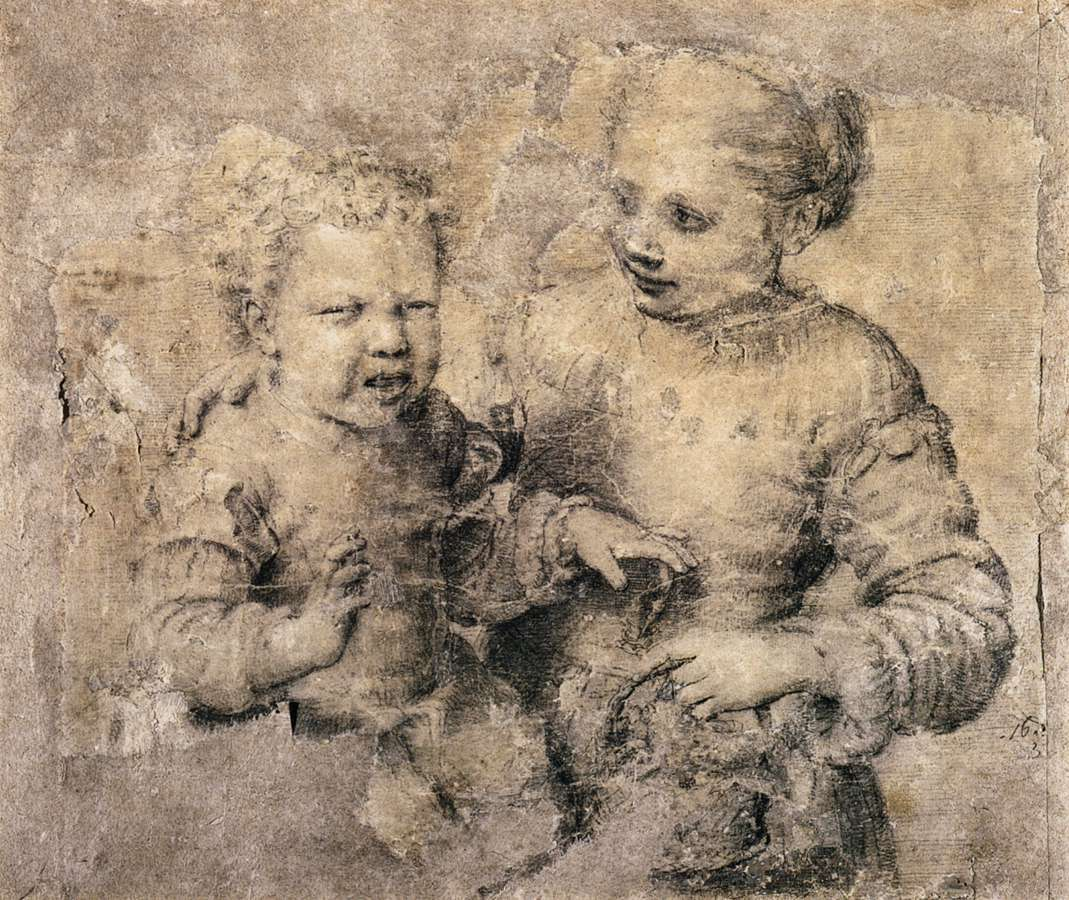
Sofonisba Anguissola, Boy Bitten by a Crab (c. 1554)

== See also ==
- List of paintings by Caravaggio
