= List of paintings by Caravaggio =

Caravaggio, born Michelangelo Merisi da Caravaggio (also Michele Angelo Merigi or Amerighi da Caravaggio; /ˌkærəˈvædʒioʊ/, US: /-ˈvɑːdʒ(i)oʊ/; Italian: [mikeˈlandʒelo meˈriːzi da (k)karaˈvaddʒo]; 29 September 1571 – 18 July 1610), was an Italian painter active in Rome for most of his artistic life. His paintings have been characterized by art critics as combining a realistic observation of the human state, both physical and emotional, with a dramatic use of lighting, which had a formative influence on Baroque painting.

Caravaggio employed close physical observation with a dramatic use of chiaroscuro that came to be known as tenebrism. He made the technique a dominant stylistic element, transfixing subjects in bright shafts of light and darkening shadows. Caravaggio vividly expressed crucial moments and scenes, often featuring violent struggles, torture, and death. He worked rapidly with live models, preferring to forgo drawings and work directly onto the canvas. His inspiring effect on the new Baroque style that emerged from Mannerism was profound. His influence can be seen directly or indirectly in the work of Peter Paul Rubens, Jusepe de Ribera, Gian Lorenzo Bernini, and Rembrandt. Artists heavily under his influence were called the "Caravaggisti" (or "Caravagesques"), as well as tenebrists or tenebrosi ("shadowists").

Caravaggio's innovations inspired Baroque painting, but the latter incorporated the drama of his chiaroscuro without the psychological realism. The style evolved and fashions changed, and Caravaggio fell out of favour. In the 20th century, interest in his work revived, and his importance to the development of Western art was reevaluated. The 20th-century art historian André Berne-Joffroy stated: "What begins in the work of Caravaggio is, quite simply, modern painting."

There is disagreement as to the size of Caravaggio's oeuvre, with counts as low as 40 and as high as 80. In his monograph of 1983, the Caravaggio scholar Alfred Moir wrote, "The forty-eight color plates in this book include almost all of the surviving works accepted by every Caravaggio expert as autograph, and even the least demanding would add fewer than a dozen more", but there have been some generally accepted additions since then. One, The Calling of Saints Peter and Andrew, was in 2006 authenticated and restored; it had been in storage in Hampton Court, mislabeled as a copy. Richard Francis Burton writes of a "picture of St. Rosario (in the museum of the Grand Duke of Tuscany), showing a circle of thirty men turpiter ligati" ("lewdly banded"), which is not known to have survived. The rejected version of Saint Matthew and the Angel, intended for the Contarelli Chapel in San Luigi dei Francesi in Rome, was destroyed during the bombing of Dresden, though black and white photographs of the work exist. In June 2011 it was announced that a previously unknown Caravaggio painting of Saint Augustine dating to about 1600 had been discovered in a private collection in Britain. Called a "significant discovery", the painting had never been published and is thought to have been commissioned by Vincenzo Giustiniani, a patron of the painter in Rome.

== List of paintings ==
Main source: Spike, John T. Caravaggio. New York : Abbeville Press, 2001: p. 253–54.

Image	Year, Name	City, Gallery	Dimensions, Technique	Notes
	c. 1592–1593: Boy Peeling Fruit	Florence, Fondazione Roberto Longhi	75.5 × 64.4 cm Oil on canvas	One of several versions, one of which is Caravaggio's earliest known work
	c. 1592-1593: Boy Peeling Fruit	London, Hampton Court Palace – Royal Collection	63 × 53 cm Oil on canvas	One of several versions, one of which is Caravaggio's earliest known work
	c. 1592–1593: Boy Peeling Fruit	Switzerland, Private collection (formerly Ishizuka Collection, Tokyo)	65 × 52 cm Oil on canvas	One of several versions, one of which is Caravaggio's earliest known work
	c. 1592–1593: Boy Peeling Fruit	London, The Dickinson Group	64.2 × 51.4 cm Oil on canvas	One of several versions, one of which is Caravaggio's earliest known work
	c. 1593: Young Sick Bacchus	Rome, Galleria Borghese	67 × 53 cm Oil on canvas	
	c. 1593: Boy with a Basket of Fruit	Rome, Galleria Borghese	70 × 67 cm Oil on canvas	
	c. 1594: Fortune Teller	Rome, Capitoline Museums	115 × 150 cm Oil on canvas	
	c. 1594: Cardsharps	Fort Worth, Kimbell Art Museum	94.2 × 131.2 cm Oil on canvas	
	c. 1595: Musicians	New York City, Metropolitan Museum of Art	87.9 × 115.9 cm Oil on canvas	
	c. 1595: Saint Francis of Assisi in Ecstasy	Hartford, Connecticut, Wadsworth Atheneum	93.9 × 129.5 cm Oil on canvas	
	c. 1596: Boy Bitten by a Lizard	London, National Gallery	66 × 49.5 cm Oil on canvas	
	c. 1596 Lute Player	Private Collection	96 × 121 cm Oil on canvas	Understood to be the original version of the Lute Player
	c. 1596: Lute Player	Saint Petersburg, Hermitage Museum	94 × 119 cm Oil on canvas	
	c. 1596: Lute Player	New York City, Metropolitan Museum of Art (on loan)	100 × 126,5 cm Oil on canvas	
	c. 1596: Basket of Fruit	Milan, Biblioteca Ambrosiana	46 × 64 cm Oil on canvas	
	c. 1596: Bacchus	Florence, Uffizi	95 × 85 cm Oil on canvas	
	c. 1597: Penitent Magdalene	Rome, Doria Pamphilj Gallery	122.5 × 98.5 cm Oil on canvas	
	c. 1597: Rest on the Flight into Egypt	Rome, Doria Pamphilj Gallery	133.5 × 166.5 cm Oil on canvas	
	c. 1597: Medusa	Florence, Uffizi	60 × 55 cm Oil on canvas over convex poplar wood shield	
	c. 1597: Portrait of a Courtesan	Berlin, Kaiser Friedrich Museum	66 × 53 cm Oil on canvas	Destroyed in 1945
	c. 1597: Jupiter, Neptune and Pluto	Rome, Casino di Villa Boncompagni Ludovisi	300 × 180 cm Ceiling fresco in oil	
	c. 1597: Fortune Teller	Paris, Musée du Louvre	99 × 131 cm Oil on canvas	
	c. 1598: Saint Catherine of Alexandria	Madrid, Thyssen-Bornemisza Museum	173 × 133 cm Oil on canvas	
	c. 1598: Sacrifice of Isaac	Princeton, Barbara Piasecka-Johnson Collection	116 × 173 cm Oil on canvas	Disputed
	c. 1598: John the Baptist	Toledo, Cathedral Museum	169 × 112 cm Oil on canvas	Disputed
	c. 1598: Martha and Mary Magdalene	Detroit, Detroit Institute of Arts	97.8 × 132.7 cm Oil on canvas	
	c. 1598: Portrait of Maffeo Barberini	Rome, Galleria Nazionale d'Arte Antica, Palazzo Barberini	124 × 99 cm Oil on canvas	Acquired by the Italian State for €30m in 2026
	c. 1598: Judith Beheading Holofernes	Rome, Galleria Nazionale d'Arte Antica, Palazzo Barberini	145 × 195 cm Oil on canvas	
	c. 1599: David and Goliath	Madrid, Museo del Prado	110 × 91 cm Oil on canvas	
	c. 1599: Narcissus	Rome, Galleria Nazionale d'Arte Antica, Palazzo Barberini	110 × 92 cm Oil on canvas	Disputed
	c. 1600: Boy Bitten by a Lizard	Florence, Fondazione Roberto Longhi	65.8 × 52.3 cm Oil on canvas	
	c. 1600: John the Baptist	Basel, Öffentliche Kunstsammlung	102.5 × 83 cm Oil on canvas	Attributed to Juan Bautista Maíno
	c. 1600: Calling of Saint Matthew	Rome, Contarelli Chapel	323 × 343 cm Oil on canvas	
	1600: Martyrdom of Saint Matthew	Rome, Contarelli Chapel	323 × 343 cm Oil on canvas	
	1600? 1609?: Nativity with Saint Francis and Saint Lawrence	Palermo, Oratory of Saint Lawrence	268 × 197 cm Oil on canvas	Stolen in 1969
	1600: Conversion of Saint Paul	Rome, private collection	237 × 189 cm Oil on cypress wood	
	1601: Crucifixion of Saint Peter	Rome, Cerasi Chapel	230 × 175 cm Oil on canvas	
	1601: Conversion of Saint Paul on the Road to Damascus	Rome, Cerasi Chapel	230 × 175 cm Oil on canvas	
	1601: Still Life with Flowers and Fruit	Rome, Galleria Borghese	105 × 184 cm Oil on canvas	Attributed to Painter of the Hartford Still Life
	1602: Supper at Emmaus	London, National Gallery	139 × 195 cm Oil on canvas	
	1602: Amor Victorious	Berlin, Gemäldegalerie	156 × 113 cm Oil on canvas	
	1602: Saint Matthew and the Angel	Berlin, Kaiser Friedrich Museum	232 × 183 cm Oil on canvas	Destroyed in 1945
	1602: Inspiration of Saint Matthew	Rome, Contarelli Chapel	292 × 186 cm Oil on canvas	
	1602: John the Baptist	Rome, Capitoline Museums	129 × 94 cm Oil on canvas	
	c. 1602: John the Baptist	Rome, Doria Pamphilj Gallery	129 × 94 cm Oil on canvas	
	c. 1602: Incredulity of Saint Thomas	Potsdam, Sanssouci Picture Gallery	107 × 146 cm Oil on canvas	
	1602: Taking of Christ	Dublin, National Gallery of Ireland	133 × 169 cm Oil on canvas	Attributed to Caravaggio in 1990
	1603: Sacrifice of Isaac	Florence, Uffizi	104 × 135 cm Oil on canvas	
	c. 1603: Holy Family with Saint John the Baptist	New York City, Metropolitan Museum of Art (on loan)	118 × 96 cm Oil on canvas	Disputed
	c. 1603: Entombment	Vatican City, Vatican Museums	300 × 203 cm Oil on canvas	
	1603: Crowning with Thorns	Prato, Cariprato Bank	125 × 178 cm Oil on canvas	
	c. 1604: Madonna of Loreto	Rome, Sant'Agostino	260 × 150 cm Oil on canvas	
	1604: John the Baptist	Kansas City, Nelson-Atkins Museum of Art	172.5 × 104.5 cm Oil on canvas	
	c. 1604: John the Baptist	Rome, Galleria Nazionale d'Arte Antica, Palazzo Corsini	94 × 131 cm Oil on canvas	
	c. 1604: The Calling of Saints Peter and Andrew	London, Hampton Court Palace – Royal Collection	140 × 176 cm Oil on canvas	
	1605: Christ on the Mount of Olives	Berlin, Kaiser Friedrich Museum	154 × 222 cm Oil on canvas	Destroyed in 1945
	c. 1605: Ecce Homo	Genoa, Palazzo Bianco	128 × 103 cm Oil on canvas	Disputed, perhaps a Flemish Caravaggesco operating in Sicily
	c. 1605: Saint Jerome in Meditation	Montserrat, Museum of Montserrat	118 × 81 cm Oil on canvas	
	c. 1605: Saint Jerome Writing	Rome, Galleria Borghese	112 × 157 cm Oil on canvas	
	1605: Portrait of Pope Paul V	Rome, Private Collection of the Prince Borghese	203 × 119 cm Oil on canvas	Disputed
	1605: Still Life with Fruit on a Stone Ledge	Rome, Galleria Borghese	87 × 135 cm Oil on canvas	Disputed
	1606: Madonna and Child with Saint Anne (Dei Palafrenieri)	Rome, Galleria Borghese	292 × 211 cm Oil on canvas	
	1601–1606: Death of the Virgin	Paris, Musée du Louvre	369 × 245 cm Oil on canvas	
	1605/1606: Magdalene Grieving	Rome, Private Collection	112 × 92 cm Oil on canvas	
	1606: Mary Magdalen in Ecstasy	Rome, Private collection	106.5 × 91 cm Oil on canvas	
	c. 1606: Saint Francis in Meditation	Cremona, Museo Civico Ala Ponzone	130 × 90 cm Oil on canvas	
	1606: Supper at Emmaus	Milan, Brera Fine Arts Academy	141 × 175 cm Oil on canvas	
	1607: Judith Beheading Holofernes	New York, J. Tomilson Hill collection	Oil on canvas	Disputed attribution. Also attributed to Louis Finson.
	1607: Seven Works of Mercy	Naples, Pio Monte della Misericordia	390 × 260 cm Oil on canvas	
	1607: Crucifixion of Saint Andrew	Cleveland, Cleveland Museum of Art	202.5 × 152.7 cm Oil on canvas	
	1607: David with the Head of Goliath	Vienna, Kunsthistorisches Museum	90.5 × 116 cm Oil on wood	
	1607: Madonna of the Rosary (Madonna del Rosario)	Vienna, Kunsthistorisches Museum	364.5 × 249.5 cm Oil on canvas	
	1607: Crowning with Thorns	Vienna, Kunsthistorisches Museum	127 × 165.5 cm Oil on canvas	
	c. 1607: Flagellation of Christ	Naples, Museo di Capodimonte	390 × 260 cm Oil on canvas	
	c. 1607: Christ at the Column	Rouen, Musée des Beaux-Arts	134.5 × 175.5 cm Oil on canvas	
	c. 1607: Salome with the Head of John the Baptist	London, National Gallery	90.5 × 167 cm Oil on canvas	
	1607: Saint Jerome Writing	Valletta, St. John's Co-Cathedral	117 × 157 cm Oil on canvas	
	1607: Ecce Homo	Madrid, Museo del Prado	111 × 86 cm Oil on canvas	
	1608: Portrait of Alof de Wignacourt and his Page	Paris, Musée du Louvre	195 × 134 cm Oil on canvas	
	1608: Portrait of Fra Antonio Martelli	Florence, Pitti Palace	118.5 × 95.5 cm Oil on canvas	
	1608: Beheading of Saint John the Baptist	Valletta, St. John's Co-Cathedral	361 × 520 cm Oil on canvas	
	1608: Sleeping Cupid	Florence, Pitti Palace	71 × 105 cm Oil on canvas	
	1608: John the Baptist	Valletta, MUZA, The Malta National Community Art Museum	100 × 73 cm Oil on canvas	Disputed
	1608: Annunciation	Nancy, Musée des Beaux-Arts	285 × 205 cm Oil on canvas	
	1608: The Burial of Saint Lucy	Syracuse, Santuario di Santa Lucia al Sepolcro	408 × 300 cm Oil on canvas	
	1609: Raising of Lazarus	Messina, Museo Regionale	380 × 275 cm Oil on canvas	
	1609: Adoration of the Shepherds	Messina, Museo Regionale	314 × 211 cm Oil on canvas	
	1609: Salome with the Head of John the Baptist	Madrid, Royal Collections Gallery	116 × 140 cm Oil on canvas	
	1609: Tooth Puller	Florence, Pitti Palace	139.5 × 194.5 cm Oil on canvas	Disputed
	1610: Denial of Saint Peter	New York City, Metropolitan Museum of Art	94 × 125 cm Oil on canvas	
	c. 1606: Saint Francis in Prayer	Rome, Church of San Pietro in Carpineto Romano currently in deposit at Il Museo E La Cripta dei Frati Cappuccini, Palazzo Barberini	130 × 90 cm Oil on canvas	
	c. 1610: John the Baptist	Rome, Galleria Borghese	159 × 124 cm Oil on canvas	
	1610: David with the Head of Goliath	Rome, Galleria Borghese	125 × 101 cm Oil on canvas	
	1610: John the Baptist	Munich, Private collection	159 × 124 cm Oil on canvas	
	1610: Martyrdom of Saint Ursula	Naples, Galleria di Palazzo Zevallos Stigliano	106 × 179.5 cm Oil on canvas	Last known work
