= Saint Matthew and the Angel =

Destroyed painting by Caravaggio

- San Matteo e l'angelo (Italian)
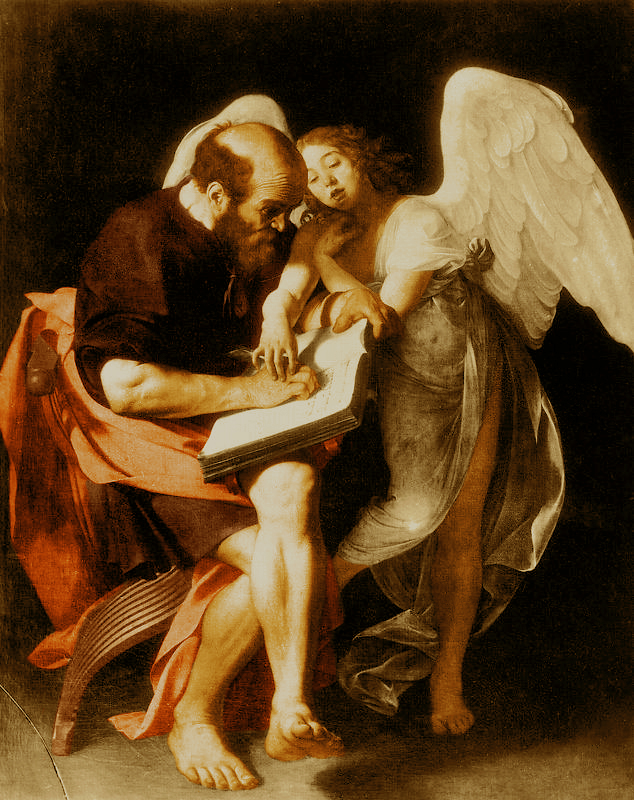
- Colorized Image
- Artist: Caravaggio
- Year: 1602
- Medium: Oil on canvas
- Dimensions: 295 cm × 195 cm (116 in × 77 in)
- Condition: Destroyed in 1945 by fire.
- Location: Kaiser Friedrich Museum, Berlin

Saint Matthew and the Angel (1602) was a painting from the Italian master Caravaggio (1571–1610), completed for the Contarelli Chapel in the church of San Luigi dei Francesi in Rome. It was destroyed in Berlin in 1945 and is now known only from black-and-white photographs and enhanced color reproductions, like the one within the infobox.

== Style ==
Caravaggio was known for painting with great realism, using models instead of standard convention and idealization. He rendered lifelike figures, as opposed to other contemporary artists painting idealized and improbable poses. In this instance, however, the patrons wanted an idealization of the beloved Saint. This could serve as inspiration to the viewer in trying to lead a more moral life. With the angel sweeping down and the Saint's stool teetering in movement, it is arguably one of Caravaggio's earliest examples of his dynamic style. It was a much more exciting composition than his first submission. Even though Caravaggio changed the composition to suit the desires of the patron, his own style is still visible to the viewer under the more refined subject of Saint Matthew.

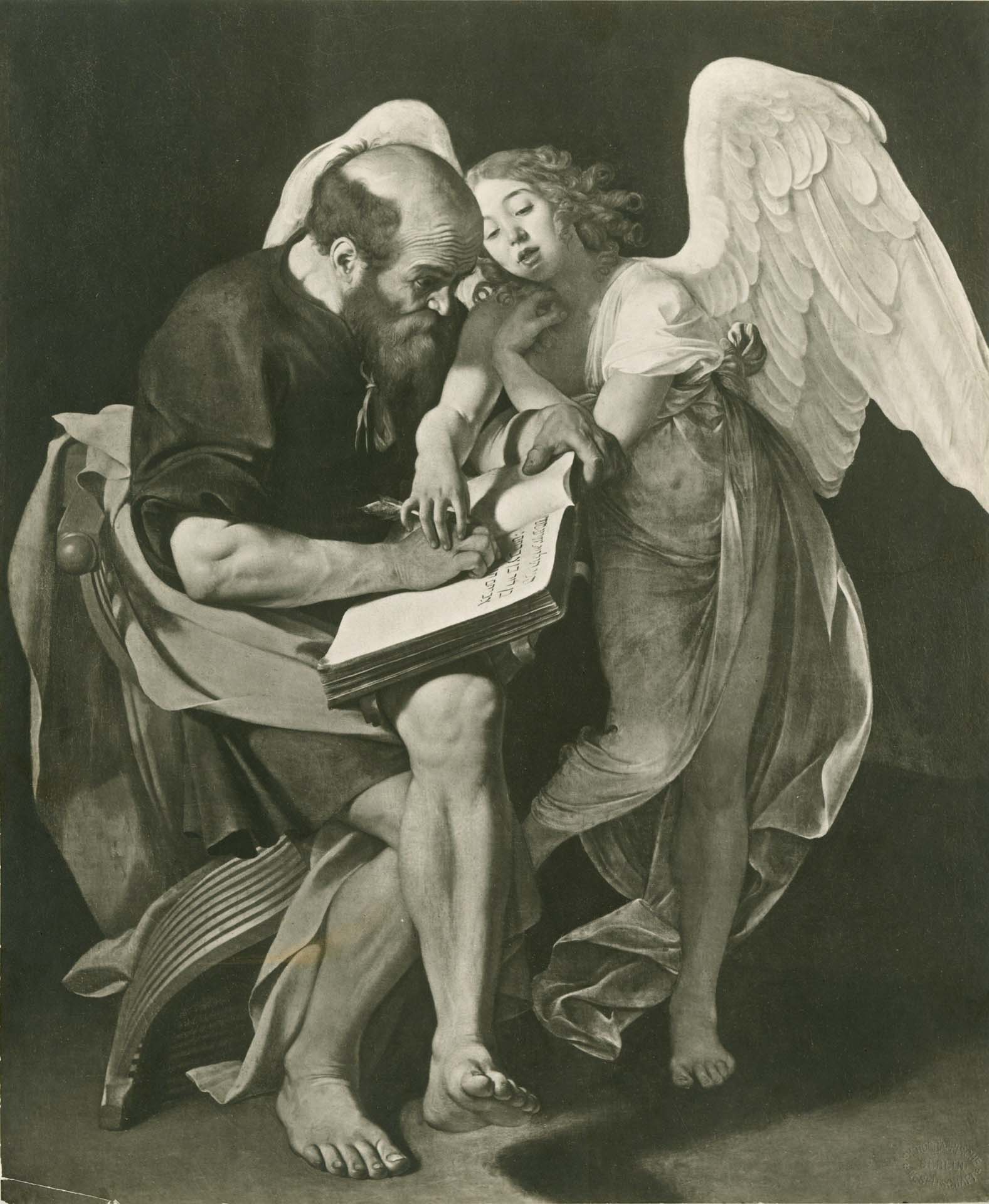
Original photo of “Saint Matthew and the Angel,” destroyed 1945 in Flakturm Friedrichshain fire, Department of Image Collections, National Gallery of Art Library, Washington, DC

== History ==
Saint Matthew and the Angel was completed in 1602. A part of the collection of the former Kaiser Friedrich Museum, it was moved to a flak tower in Berlin for safety, but was destroyed by fire at the end of World War II. This work, by a pillar of the Baroque movement, might have provided new information about the artist and patron. Reproductions of the original still survive.

== Commission ==
Saint Matthew and the Angel was created as a commission for the Contarelli Chapel. Caravaggio was previously commissioned to paint two scenes of the saint's life, and after the patrons were satisfied with them, a third was commissioned.

The Contarelli Chapel was dedicated to Saint Matthew. With funds left for its building in 1585, it was completed in 1600. Cardinal Del Monte played a major part in orchestrating the decoration of its interior, and was the one who suggested Caravaggio as the painter of the scenes of Saint Matthew's life. The altar was to be composed of two Caravaggio paintings as well as a statue of the saint by Flemish artist Jacob Cobaert. However, the church was not pleased with the statue and Caravaggio was re-hired to do another piece as the center for the altar, to show Saint Matthew writing the Gospel under the guidance of an angel. Caravaggio depicted the Saint as an unlearned peasant, gaping in the presence of the angel. The church rejected Caravaggio's irreverent presentation of the saint, and Caravaggio replaced it with a more glorifying image, The Inspiration of Saint Matthew, which remains in the Chapel today.

== Comparison ==
The comparison is not perfect because the only images available of the lost Saint Matthew and the Angel are black and white photographs that were taken before World War II. The lost painting showed Saint Matthew as poorly groomed, with dirty feet. Although this was the style of Caravaggio, the church leaders thought it was too crude and did not want to have what looked like a peasant hanging in their sacred altarpiece. In addition, they thought that this Matthew did not match the other two paintings that Caravaggio had already done. It was apparently disconnected and therefore had no place with the others. The second piece keeps true to the same subject, but with a few changes. Matthew looks more like the other two Matthews in the altar. The Saint is now more serious and in control in the presence of the angel. Instead of being fully controlled by the angel, Saint Matthew is only encouraged by the angel in the second one.

== See also ==
- Artistic scandal
- List of paintings by Caravaggio
