= Paintings attributed to Caravaggio =

A number of paintings have been attributed from time to time to the Italian artist Michelangelo Merisi da Caravaggio (1571–1610), but are no longer generally accepted as genuine. Immensely popular in his own lifetime, he fell into neglect almost immediately upon his death, with the result that now, four hundred years later, it is often extremely difficult to distinguish works by the master from copies or from original creations by his most gifted followers.

== The Tooth Puller ==
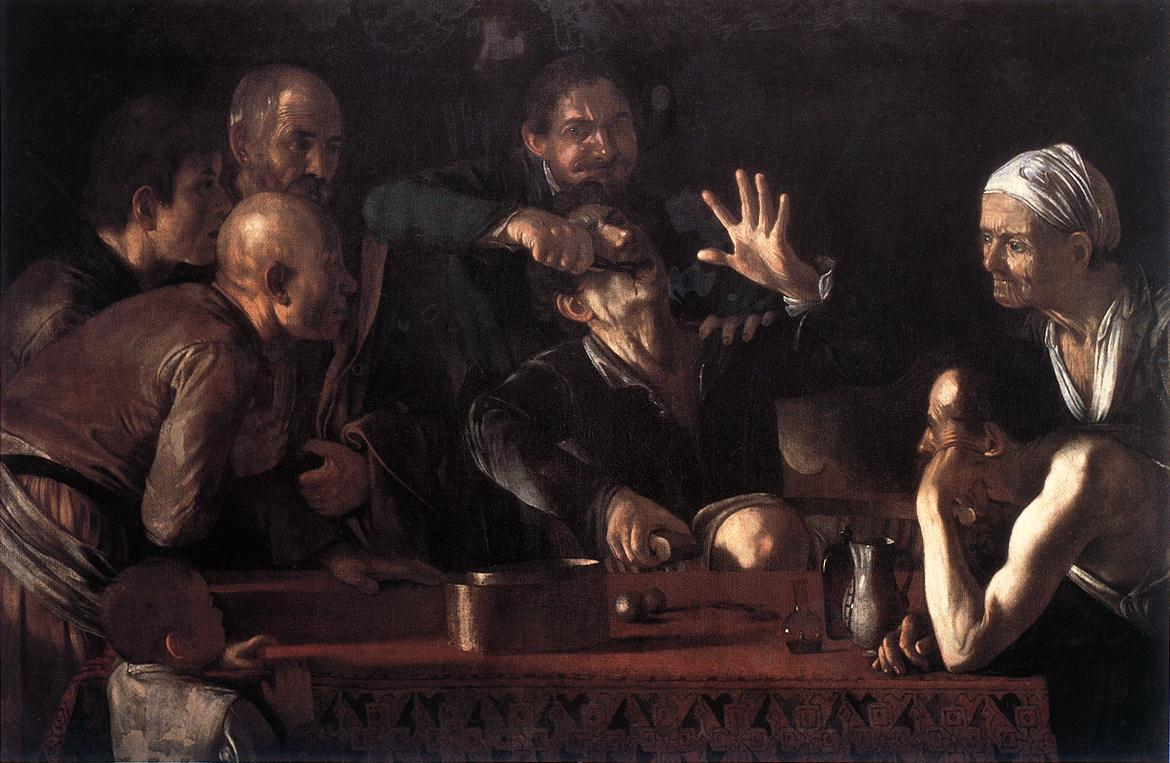
The Toothpuller. c. 1607/1608. Pitti Palace, Florence

The case in favor of recognizing The Tooth Puller as was first advanced by the scholar Mina Gregori in 1992, and discussed by John Gash in an article in Melita Historica in 1998. On the side of arguments for genuineness, almost every figure in the painting is based on figures in other, genuine, works by Caravaggio, and from such a variety of sources and cities that it is almost inconceivable that any Caravaggisti could have seen them all; the style is typical of Caravaggio's late style, specifically his Maltese stay in 1607/1608; and he had begun his career in Rome with broadly similar genre works. On the other hand, there is no other surviving example of a genre painting by Caravaggio after about 1600, and, of course, there is no mention of the painting – or of any late-period genre painting – in sources such as Giovanni Bellori, who otherwise seems to have been thorough in seeking out Caravaggio's works.

== Still Life with Flowers and Fruits ==
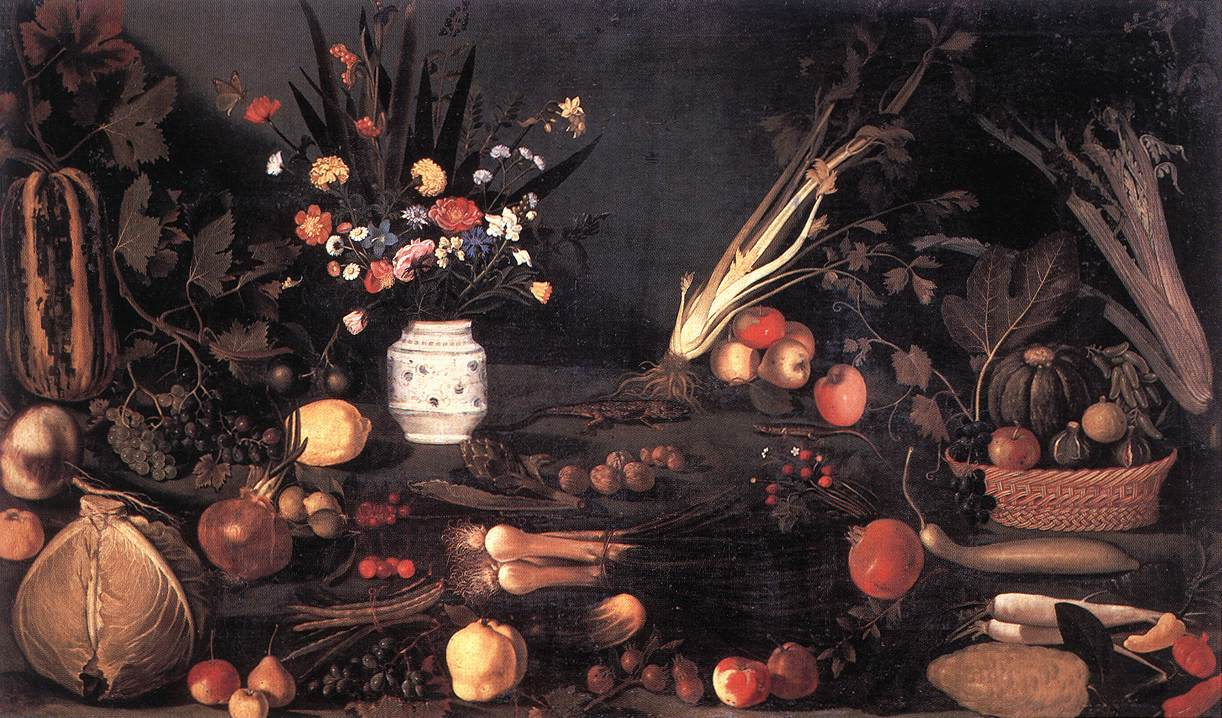
Still Life with Flowers and Fruit. 1590s. Borghese Gallery, Rome

According to tradition, Caravaggio painted flowers and fruit when he first came to Rome. Individual pieces of this Still Life with Flowers and Fruit are brilliantly painted and call to mind the mastery of such subjects that Caravaggio showed in early works such as Boy with a Basket of Fruit, as well as his reported comment that it took as much trouble to paint a flower as it did to paint a man. Nevertheless, the overall composition is awkward and it is not accepted as genuine. The painting is ascribed to an artist known as the Painter of the Wadsworth Atheneum Still-Life, after a work in the Wadsworth Atheneum, Hartford, Connecticut.

== John the Baptist (Basel Öffentliche Kunstsammlung) ==
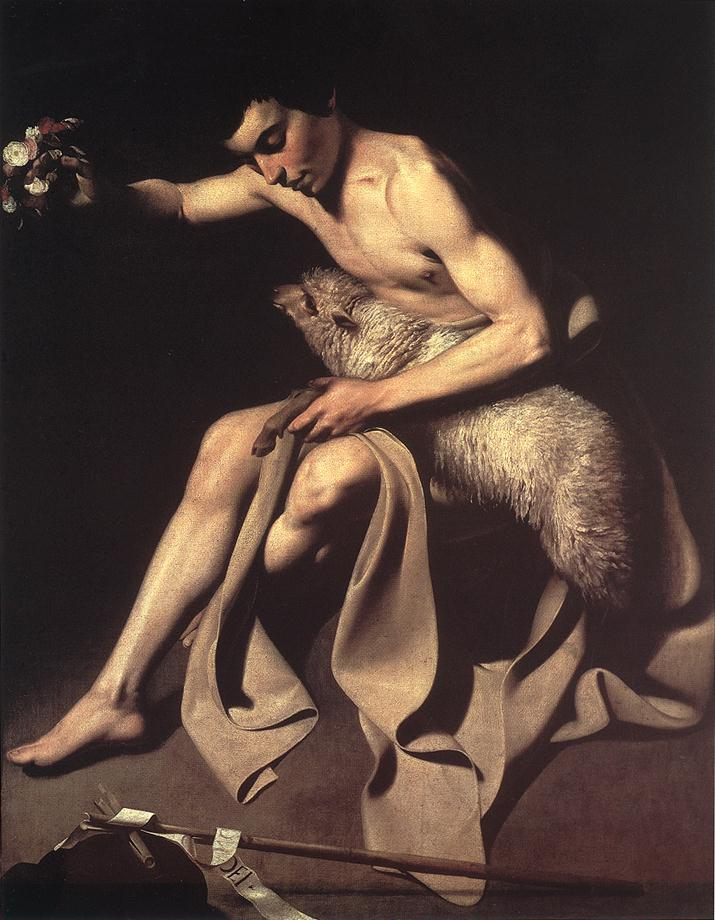
John the Baptist. Date unknown. Öffentliche Kunstsammlung, Basel

The John the Baptist from Basel has many of the stylistic marks of Caravaggio – the use of deep shadows, the isolated youthful Baptist – but is not widely accepted as genuine. A comparison with Carlo Sellitto shows how well the more gifted of Caravaggio's followers absorbed not only the superficial tricks of style but the underlying ethos as well, to the point of becoming virtually indistinguishable from the work of the master. The Basel Baptist, despite being a very attractive painting in its own right, is a quite forthright and traditional piece of Counter-Reformation iconography (the Baptist is holding out roses, symbol of the Passion, before the sheep, representing Christ's future sacrifice), and has none of the deep pathos and ambiguously mingled sensuality and spirituality that Caravaggio brought to his long contemplation of John the Baptist.

== See also ==
- List of paintings by Caravaggio
