= Mario Minniti =

Italian painter

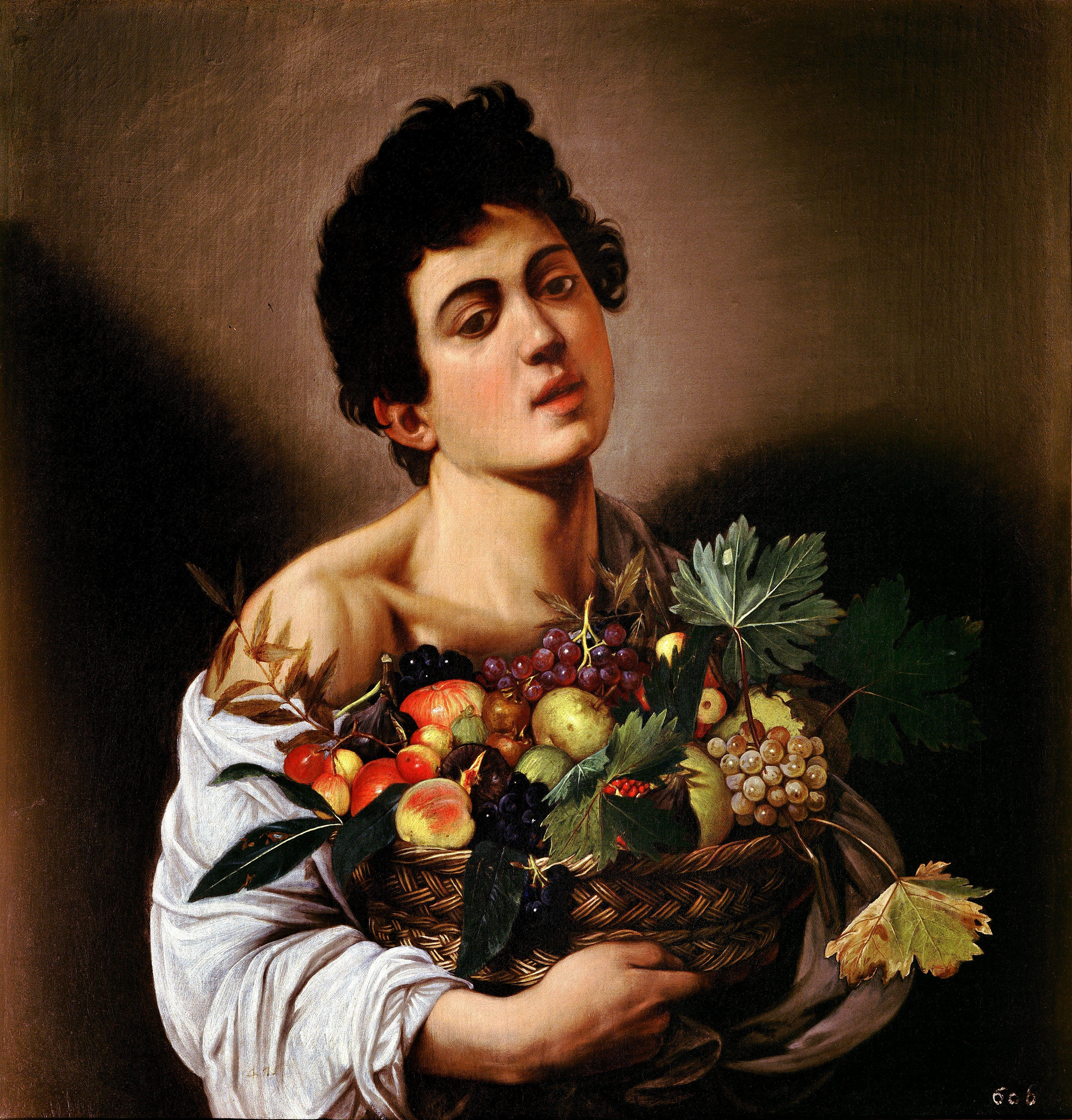
Minniti at age 16, serving as a model for Caravaggio's painting Boy with a Basket of Fruit.

Mario Minniti (8 December 1577 – 22 November 1640) was an Italian Baroque painter active in Sicily after 1606.

== Life ==
Born in Syracuse, Sicily, he arrived in Rome in 1593, where he became the friend, collaborator, and model of the key Baroque painter Michelangelo Merisi da Caravaggio (1571–1610). His main fame today is his identification, or proposed identification, as a model in many of Caravaggio's early works, including Boy with a Basket of Fruit, The Fortune Teller, The Musicians, Boy Bitten by a Lizard (probable), Bacchus, The Lute Player, The Calling of Saint Matthew, and The Martyrdom of Saint Matthew.

He ceases to appear as a model after about 1600, when he is believed to have married, but he may have been involved with Caravaggio and others in the 1606 street brawl which resulted in the death of Ranuccio Tomassoni at Caravaggio's hands – his biographer records that he fled to Sicily following a homicide, from where he petitioned for a pardon (it was eventually granted), and it is known that he sheltered Caravaggio during the latter's stay in Sicily in 1608–1609, procuring for him the important commission for the Burial of Saint Lucy. In Sicily he established a successful workshop producing religious commissions and eventually became a respected local businessman.

Because of the nature of his output, where paintings were produced as a collaborative effort by assistants and pupils, it is frequently difficult to identify exactly which works, or parts of works, are by Minniti's own hand. It is clear that he brought to Sicily the lessons he had learnt from Caravaggio, in particular the use of dramatic chiaroscuro and the depiction of scenes seized at the moment of greatest dramatic intensity, but his work (or rather his workshop's output) has been criticised for "endlessly recycled motifs" and "bland religious canvasses". Nevertheless, he is held in high regard in Sicily, and it is possible to speak of a 'School of Minniti' in the island's artistic history.

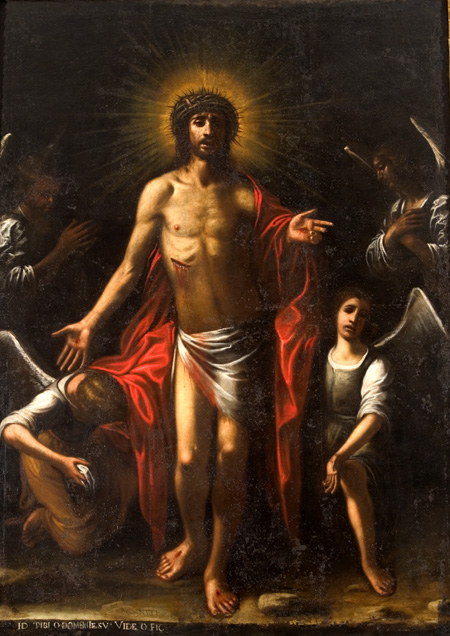
The Five Signs, workshop of Mario Minniti, showing characteristic Caravaggistic chiaroscuro and use of colour. Agira (Enna), Sicily – Church of Sant'Antonio.
