= Young Sick Bacchus =

Painting by Caravaggio

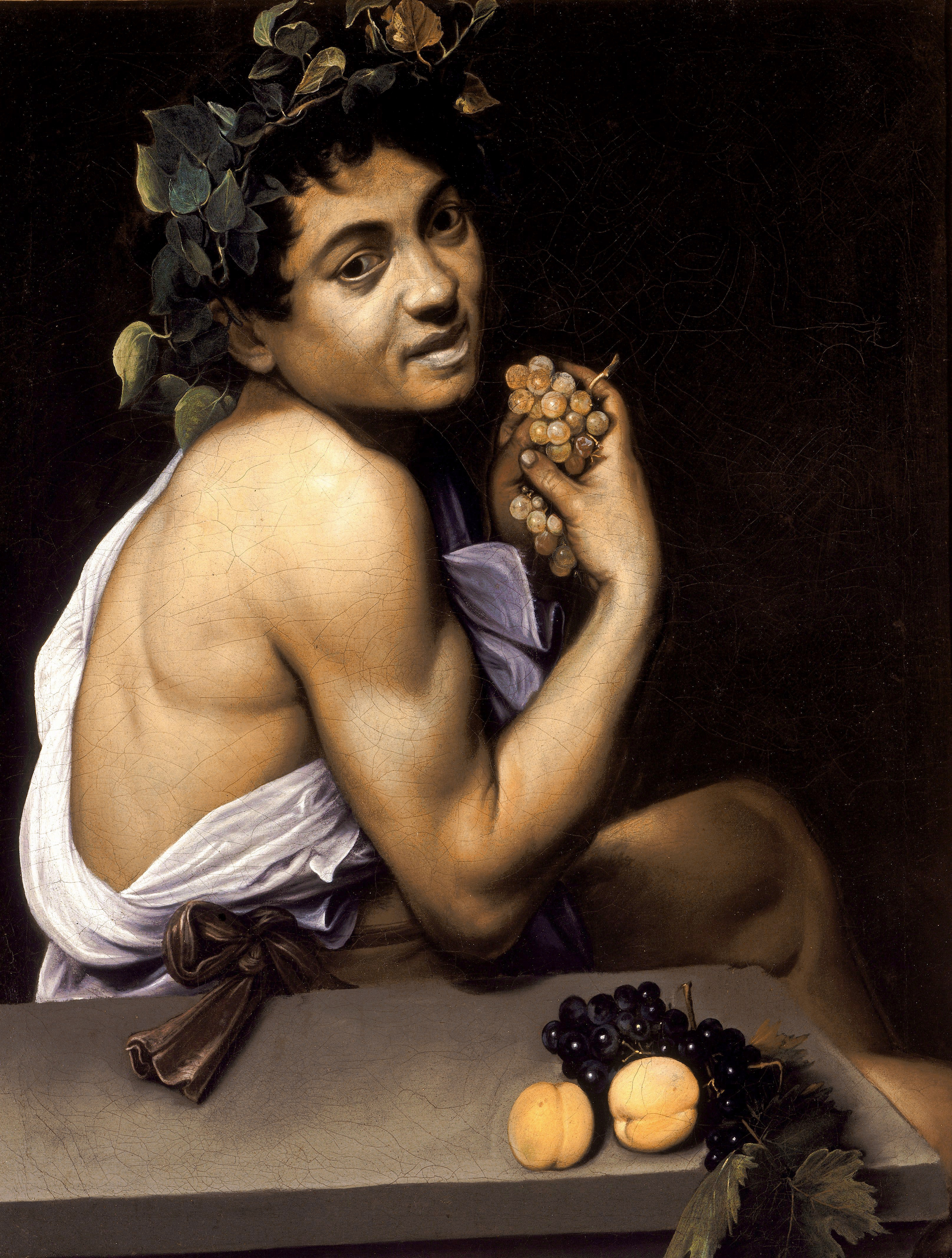
- Artist: Caravaggio
- Year: c. 1593
- Medium: oil on canvas
- Dimensions: 67 cm × 53 cm (26 in × 21 in)
- Location: Galleria Borghese, Rome

The Young Sick Bacchus (Italian: Bacchino Malato), also known as the Sick Bacchus or the Self-Portrait as Bacchus, is an early self-portrait by the Italian Baroque artist Michelangelo Merisi da Caravaggio, dated between 1593 and 1594. It now hangs in the Galleria Borghese in Rome. According to Caravaggio's first biographer, Giovanni Baglione, it was a cabinet piece painted by the artist using a mirror.

== History ==
The painting dates from Caravaggio's first years in Rome following his arrival from his native Milan in mid-1592. Sources for this period are inconclusive and probably inaccurate, but they agree that at one point the artist fell extremely ill and spent six months in the hospital of Santa Maria della Consolazione. According to a 2009 article in the American medical publication Clinical Infectious Diseases, the painting indicates that Caravaggio's physical ailment likely involved malaria, as the jaundiced appearance of the skin and the icterus in the eyes are indications of some active hepatic disease causing high levels of bilirubin. According to Paolo Zamboni professor of Vascular Surgery at University of Ferrara, the obvious signs of anemia, yellow skin, and acanthosis nigricans lead back to the diagnosis in painting of Addison's disease, a condition described by Addison in the 1800s that affects the adrenal glands.

The Sick Bacchus was among the many works making up the collection of Giuseppe Cesari, one of Caravaggio's early employers, which was seized by the art-collector Cardinal-Nephew Scipione Borghese in 1607, together with the Boy Peeling Fruit and Boy with a Basket of Fruit.

== Style ==
Apart from its assumed autobiographical content, this early painting was likely used by Caravaggio to market himself, demonstrating his virtuosity in painting genres such as still-life and portraits and hinting at the ability to paint the classical figures of antiquity. The three-quarters angle of the face was among those preferred for late renaissance portraiture, but what is striking is the grimace and tilt of the head, and the very real sense of the suffering; a feature that most Baroque art shares.

The still-life can be compared with that contained in slightly later works such as the Boy With a Basket of Fruit and the Boy Bitten by a Lizard where the fruits are in a much better condition, reflecting no doubt Caravaggio's improved condition, both physically and mentally.

The painting shows the influence of his teacher, the Bergamasque Simone Peterzano, in the utilization of the tensed musculature depiction, and of the austere Lombard school style in its attention to realistic details.

== Commentary ==
Cindy Sherman, as part of her History Portrait series (1989–90), produced a parody on Sick Bacchus, an ironic photographic self-portrait named Untitled # 224.

During a 2018 NPR interview, Paul Janeway of the band St. Paul & the Broken Bones said that the title of his band's new album, Young Sick Camellia, is an homage to Caravaggio's Young Sick Bacchus (camellias being the state flower of the band's home state, Alabama).

== See also ==
- List of paintings by Caravaggio
