= The Inspiration of Saint Matthew =

Painting by Caravaggio

- San Matteo e angelo (Italian)
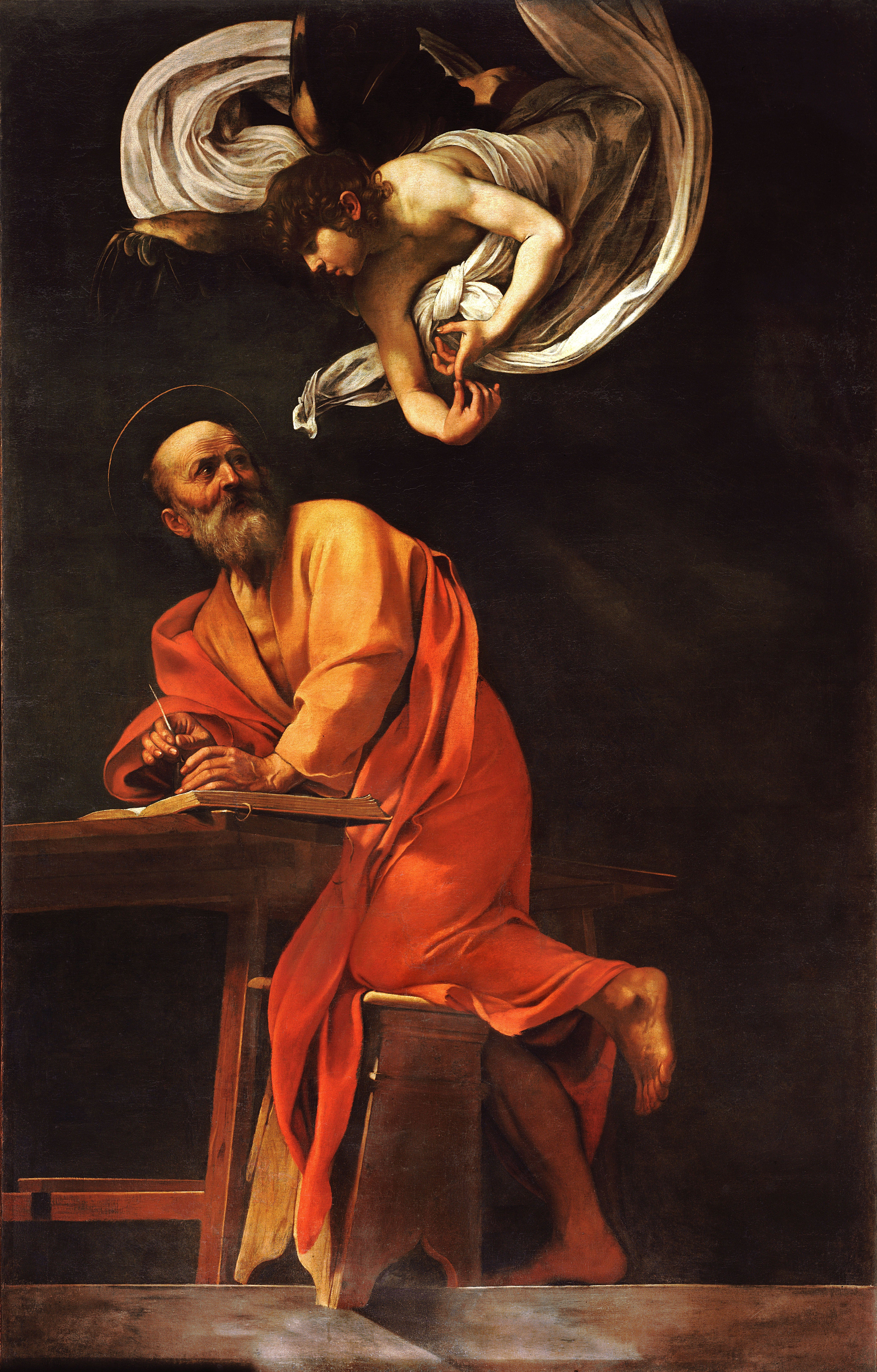
- The Inspiration of Saint Matthew
- Artist: Caravaggio
- Year: 1602
- Medium: Oil on canvas
- Dimensions: 292 cm × 186 cm (115 in × 73 in)
- Location: San Luigi dei Francesi, Rome

The Inspiration of Saint Matthew is an oil on canvas painting by the Italian Baroque master Michelangelo Merisi da Caravaggio, from 1602. Commissioned by the French Cardinal Matthieu Cointerel, the canvas hangs in the Contarelli Chapel altar in the church of the French congregation San Luigi dei Francesi, in Rome.

It is one of three Caravaggio canvases in the chapel: hanging between the larger earlier canvases of The Martyrdom of Saint Matthew, and The Calling of Saint Matthew. This was not an easy commission for Caravaggio, and at least two of the three paintings had to be either replaced or repainted to satisfy his patron, Cardinal Francesco Maria del Monte.

== Creation ==
In February 1602, following the installation of his first two pieces in the chapel, Caravaggio was commissioned to create an altarpiece, meant to be delivered by that years Pentecost. The first painting he created, Saint Matthew and the Angel, was rejected, and later would be accidentally destroyed in World War II.

The Inspiration of Saint Matthew was finished rather quickly, with Caravaggio receiving payment in September 1602.

== Description ==
In the work featured on the altar, the angel belongs to an aerial and sublime dimension, enveloped in an encircling rippled sheet. The restless Matthew leans to work, as the angel enumerates for him the work to come. All is darkness, except for the two large figures. Matthew appears to have rushed to his desk, his stool teetering into our space, and he has a sober expression.

== See also ==
- List of paintings by Caravaggio
