= The Martyrdom of Saint Matthew (Caravaggio) =

Painting by Caravaggio

- Martirio di San Matteo (Italian)
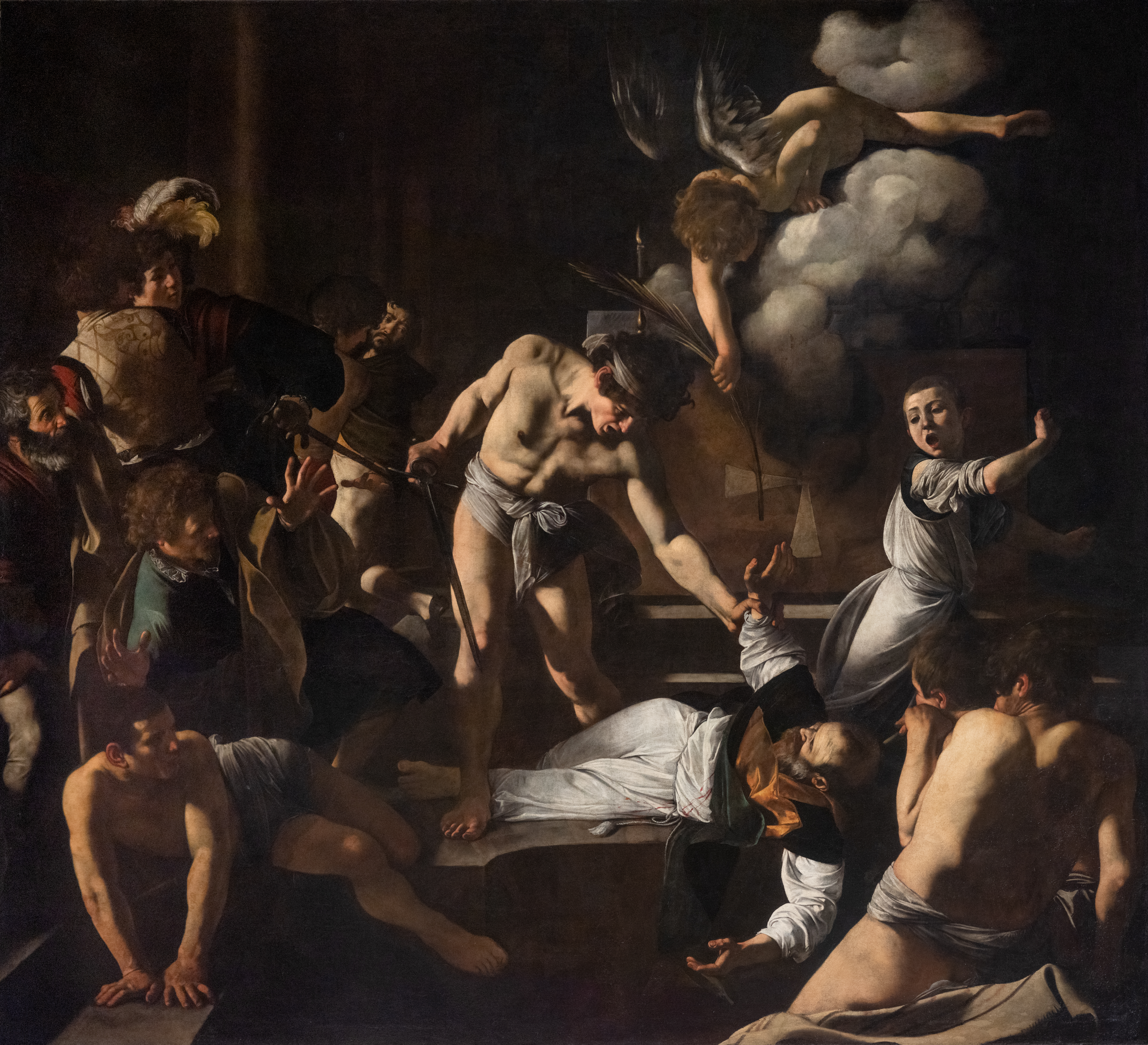
- Artist: Caravaggio
- Year: 1599–1600
- Medium: Oil on canvas
- Dimensions: 323 cm × 343 cm (127 in × 135 in)
- Location: San Luigi dei Francesi, Rome

The Martyrdom of Saint Matthew (Italian: Martirio di San Matteo; 1599–1600) is a painting by the Italian master Michelangelo Merisi da Caravaggio. It is located in the Contarelli Chapel of the church of the French congregation San Luigi dei Francesi in Rome, where it hangs opposite The Calling of Saint Matthew and beside the altarpiece The Inspiration of Saint Matthew, both by Caravaggio. It was the first of the three to be installed in the chapel, in July 1600.

The painting shows the martyrdom of Saint Matthew the Evangelist, author of the Gospel of Matthew. According to tradition, the saint was killed on the orders of the king of Ethiopia while celebrating Mass at the altar. The king lusted after his own niece, and had been rebuked by Matthew, for the girl was a nun, and therefore the bride of Christ. Cardinal Matthieu Cointerel, who had died several decades earlier, had laid down very explicitly what was to be shown: the saint being murdered by a soldier sent by the wicked king, some suitable architecture, and crowds of onlookers showing appropriate emotion. (See the article on the Contarelli Chapel).

The commission (which, strictly speaking, was from his patron, Cardinal Francesco Maria del Monte, rather than from the church itself), caused Caravaggio considerable difficulty, as he had never painted so large a canvas, nor one with so many figures. X-rays reveal two separate attempts at the composition before the one we see today, with a general movement towards simplification through reduction in the number of figures, and reduction – ultimately elimination – of the architectural element.

The figure in the background, about left-centre and behind the assassin, is a self-portrait by Caravaggio.

== Stages of painting ==
The first version revealed by the x-rays is in the Mannerist style of the most admired artist in Rome at the time, Giuseppe Cesari, with a crowd of small figures amidst massive architecture. It must have seemed static and distanced. The second version turned to Raphael for a model, adding a crowd of onlookers displaying fear and pity, including a woman who presumably represented the nun. This was in line with the crowded scene requested by Cardinal Contarelli and with the tenets of Mannerism, which demanded bodies and buildings defined by perspective and drawing, but Caravaggio had already developed a personal style in which bodies were defined by light and darkness and in which backgrounds were eliminated.

At this point Caravaggio left off the Martydom and turned his attention to the companion piece, the Calling. This drew on his own earlier genre-pieces, Cardsharps and The Fortune Teller, but writ large. Apparently re-inspired, or perhaps with renewed self-confidence, Caravaggio turned back to the Martydom, but this time working in his own idiom. The third version dropped the architecture, reduced the number of actors, and moved the action closer to the viewer; more than this, it introduced the dramatic chiaroscuro which picks out the most important elements of the subject, in much the same way a spotlight picks out the action on a stage, but centuries before spotlights were imagined, and chose to represent the moment of greatest drama, as the murderer has plunged his sword into the fallen saint. This is the version we see today, the action caught at the moment of highest drama, the bystanders reduced to supporting roles by the sharply selective light, the whole giving the impression of a moment seen as if in a lightning flash.

== Analysis ==
This painting marks the moment when the Mannerist orthodoxy of the late 16th century – rational, intellectual, perhaps a little artificial – gives way to the Baroque. It caused a sensation. Federico Zuccari, one of the most eminent painters in Rome and a champion of Mannerism, came to see, and sniffed that it was nothing. But the younger artists were totally won over, and Caravaggio became suddenly the most famous artist in Rome.

It takes concentration to understand that the confused melee is a victory of sainthood. Saint Matthew appears to recoil as he falls before the naked fury of his executioner, burning in the glare of light, who withdraws his sword from the saint's chest. Around the saint are persons showing varied emotions, as required by Contarelli: terror, awe, and consternation, while an angel holds out the palm of martyrdom. Confusion about the image can be alleviated by understanding that Matthew is not quailing in fear at the executioner's strike, instead he reaches for the angel's gift. The executioner's grasp and the angel's reach are two parallel paths. Only Matthew is privy to the angelic visitation. Viewed as such, this is a painting not about a moment of general terror, but the death of a saint as the personal handshake of the divine. Italian Baroque painting and sculpture of the time commonly depicted martyrdoms not as moments of fear, but as moments of joy or ecstasy, as in for example, Bernini's Santa Bibiana.

One factor worth noting is that Caravaggio, unlike his Mannerist predecessors, has actually made a simple fact of early modern church architecture work in his favour: large cathedrals like Saint Peter's might be well lit, but small chapels like the Contarelli were not. They were, and are, dark and narrow. As Caravaggio's biographer Peter Robb puts it: "Anyone coming down the nave of San Luigi (the church which contains the chapel) would've seen the pale killer nudes looming out of the dark from a distance, in a space that seemed to open out of the wall into the church's real transept."

That said, the painting contains many references from Michelangelo, Raphael and others, which critic John Gash ascribes not so much to a need to find appropriate poses as to a desire for "a quality of monumental grandeur akin to that of the High Renaissance." The figures of the saint and the horror-struck boy on the left, for example, are borrowed "to the extent of almost 'quoting' directly" from Titian's altarpiece of The Assassination of Saint Peter Martyr in Venice.

== See also ==
- Conversion on the Way to Damascus
- List of paintings by Caravaggio

== References and further reading ==
- Prose, Francine (2005). Caravaggio: Painter of Miracles. ISBN 0-06-057560-3.
- Spike, John T. (2001). Caravaggio. ISBN 0-7892-0639-0.
- Gash, John (2003). Caravaggio. ISBN 1-904449-22-0.
- Robb, Peter (1998). M. ISBN 0-312-27474-2.
- Langdon, Helen (1998). Caravaggio: A Life. ISBN 0-374-11894-9.
- Jadli, Anas (2025). The Rest at Work. A New Approach of Caravaggio’s Religious Paintings Through Lighting, Visibility, and Display Conditions (Contarelli Chapel, 1599-2025).
