= The Calling of Saints Peter and Andrew =

Painting by Caravaggio

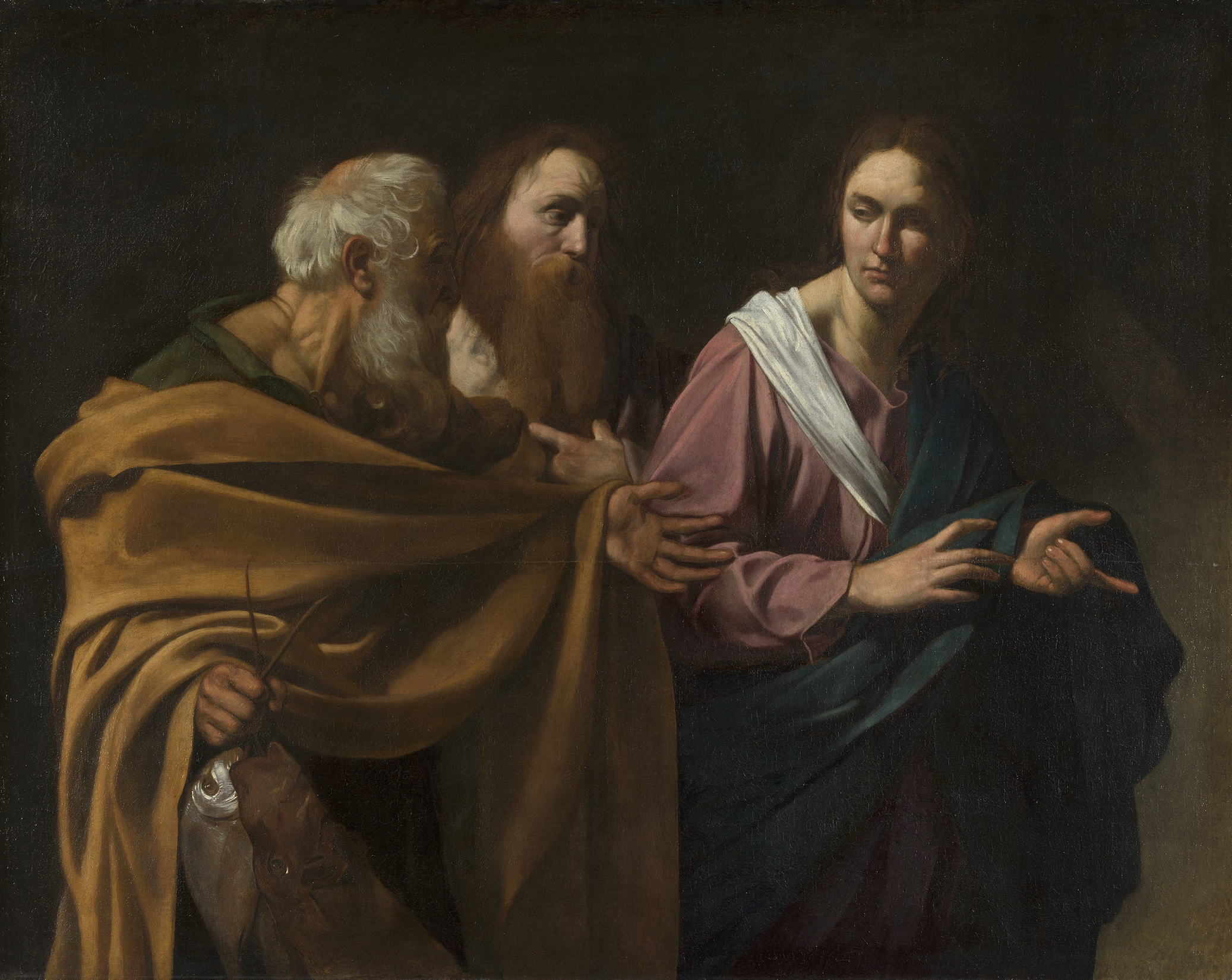
- Artist: Caravaggio
- Year: c. 1603–1606
- Medium: Oil on canvas
- Dimensions: 140 cm × 170 cm (55 in × 67 in)
- Location: Royal Collection, London

The Calling of Saints Peter and Andrew is a painting by the Italian Baroque master Caravaggio. It takes its theme from a passage in the Gospel of Matthew describing the moment when Christ called the two brothers Simon – later known as Peter – and Andrew, to be his disciples:

As Jesus walked by the Sea of Galilee, he saw two brothers, Simon, who is called Peter, and Andrew his brother, casting a net into the sea – for they were fishermen. And he said to them, "Follow me, and I will make you fishers of men." Immediately, they left their nets and followed him.

— Matthew 4:18–20

The painting shows a young, beardless Christ, leading the two much older-looking brothers. The more prominent of the brothers, presumably Simon, is holding a fish in his right hand. The edge of the canvas is rather damaged, but the central panel is in good condition. The presence of "incisions" into the ground of the canvas marking out St. Peter's ear and the eyes of Christ are typical of Caravaggio's technique. The painting appears to date from the height of Caravaggio's Roman period, c. 1603–06.

== Provenance ==
The work was purchased by Charles I, an avid art collector, in 1637. Sold during the Commonwealth, it was re-acquired by Charles II after the Restoration. It has since remained in the Royal Collection, and between 2022 and 2026 it was on display in Hampton Court Palace near London. It was long believed to be a relatively valueless copy of a lost original, but after six years of restoration and examination, the Royal Collection declared on 10 November 2006 that this was, in fact, an authentic Caravaggio. The verdict has been corroborated by external experts. Works from the Royal Collection are rarely sold as the collection is held in trust for the Crown.

After a six-year cleaning project, it went on display as part of a small exhibition of Caravaggio paintings at the Termini Art Gallery in Rome's Termini Station from 22 November to 31 January 2006. It then moved to an exhibition (from March 2007) of Italian Baroque and Renaissance art at the King's Gallery, Buckingham Palace. In 2015 it was put on display in the Cumberland Gallery in Hampton Court Palace, but has since been removed.

== See also ==
- List of paintings by Caravaggio
