= Fondazione Roberto Longhi =

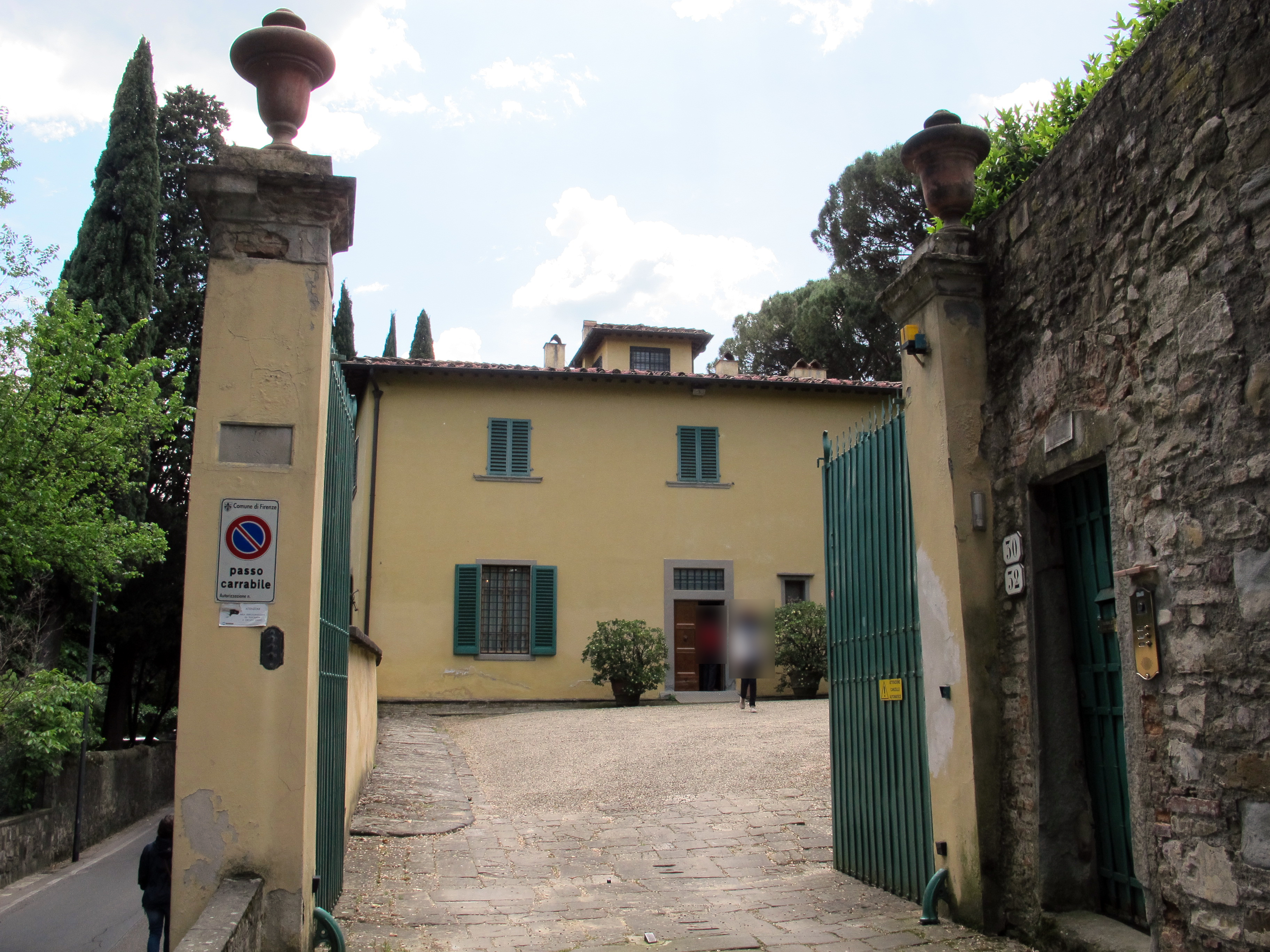
- Established: 1970
- Location: Florence, Italy
- Coordinates: 43°45′34″N 11°16′40″E
- Type: archive art museum museum museum of modern art
- Collection size: 221 item
- Area: 600 m^{2} (6,500 sq ft)
- Website: www.fondazionelonghi.it/home.php
- Location of Fondazione Roberto Longhi

The Fondazione Roberto Longhi is an institute established by Italian scholar Roberto Longhi. It is located on Via Benedetto Fortini in Florence, Tuscany, Italy.

== History ==
The headquarters is the villa "Il Tasso", which Longhi acquired in 1939. This villa was the residence of Longhi and his wife, Lucia Lopresti (the writer Anna Banti). The Foundation's preferred sphere of interest is art historical research. It also focuses on artists and specific artistic themes, including contemporary art and artists. The museum (pinacoteca) of the Foundation is open only to scholars and by appointment.

== Activities ==
The Foundation's activities include art exhibits, publications, lessons, conferences, seminars, and scholarly meetings. These meetings are organized on a periodic basis and are generally of an international and interdisciplinary nature.

Each year, the Foundation grants a series of fellowships to young Italian and foreign scholars selected on the basis of a competition. Since 1971, 300 young scholars have been granted a fellowship by the Longhi Foundation. Many of them now work in renowned museums or are professors in important Italian and foreign universities.
