= Contarelli Chapel =

Chapel in the church of San Luigi dei Francesi in Rome

Coordinates: 41°53′58″N 12°28′29″E

- Cappella Contarelli
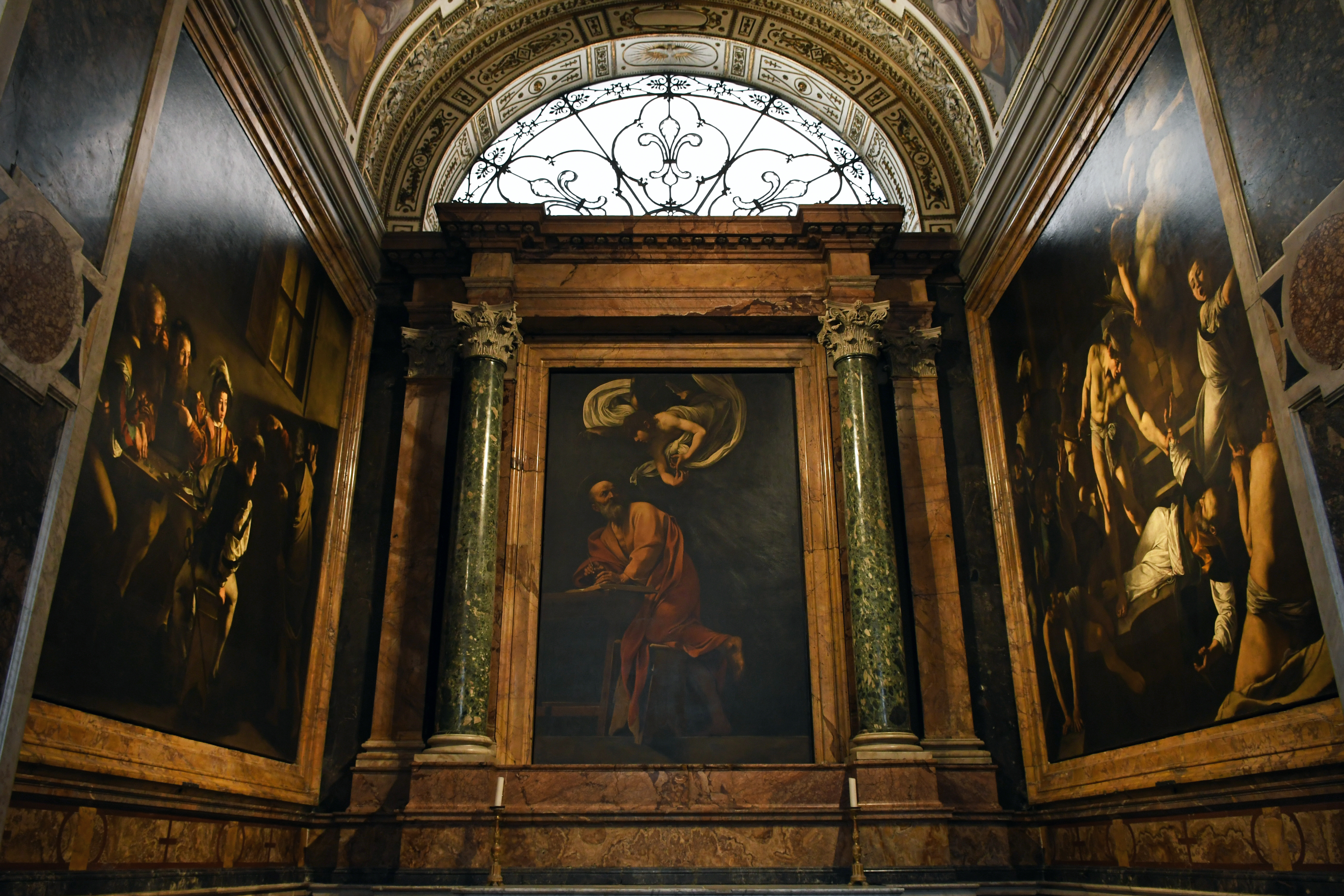
- Contarelli Chapel
- Location: San Luigi dei Francesi, Rome
- Country: Italy
- Denomination: Roman Catholic

History
- Dedication: St. Matthew

Architecture
- Style: Baroque
- Groundbreaking: 1599

Administration
- Archdiocese: Rome
- Parish: San Luigi dei Francesi

The Contarelli Chapel or Cappella Contarelli is located within the church of San Luigi dei Francesi in Rome. It is famous for housing three paintings on the theme of Saint Matthew the Evangelist by the Baroque master Caravaggio. The paintings were Caravaggio's first major public commission and one that cemented his reputation as a master artist. The chapel commemorates the French cardinal Matthieu Cointerel.

== History ==
The chapel owes its existence to an endowment left by the French cardinal, Matthieu Cointerel (Contarelli in Italian), who died in 1585. He left instructions for the decoration of the chapel, the first one to the left of the apse, which he had purchased within San Luigi dei Francesi ("Saint Louis of the French"), the church of the French community in Rome in 1565. The cardinal was rich and he had already paid for part of the construction of the church facade. He put a large sum towards the high altar and specified that his chapel be decorated with scenes from the life of his name-saint, Matthew the Evangelist.

Cointerel's executor, Virglio Cresenzi, commissioned a Flemish sculptor, Jacques Cobaert, to make a marble statue of Matthew and an angel for the altar. Giuseppe Cesari, then one of the foremost artists in Rome, was contracted to fresco the two side walls and the vault. The details were clearly set out in the contract—Cobaert's altarpiece would show Matthew sitting in a chair, about to write the Gospel, with an angel standing and "appearing to reason or in other suitable pose." Cesari's side walls would show, on the right, Saint Matthew in his counting house (Matthew was a tax collector before becoming an apostle of Christ), suitably dressed, rising "to go to Our Lord, who, passing by with his disciples in the street, calls him...". And on the left, Matthew at the moment of his martyrdom, celebrating Mass at the altar, with "a crowd of men and women, young and old and children...some appalled and others pitying...".

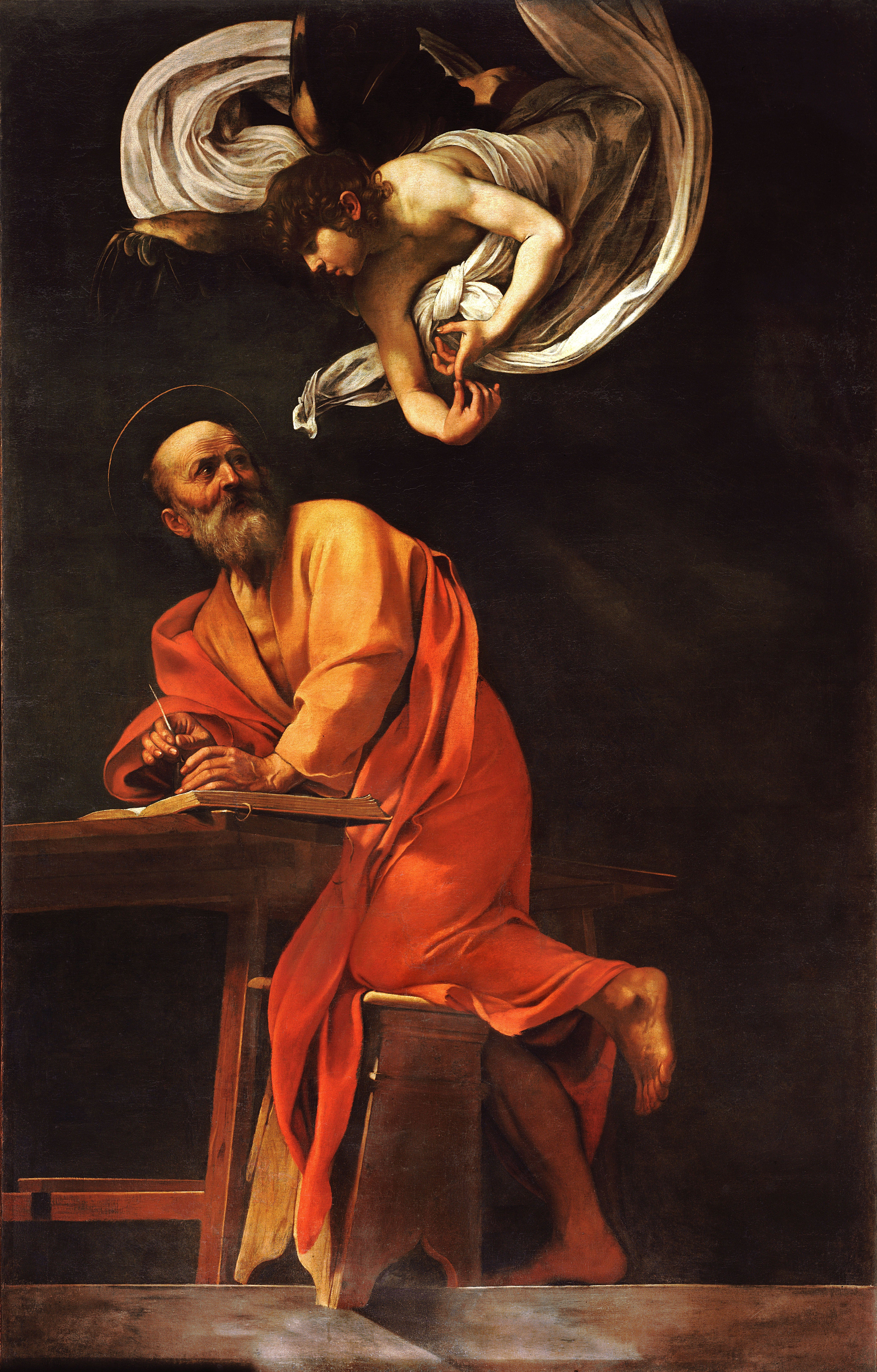
The Inspiration of St. Matthew, Caravaggio

== Artworks ==
Cesari finished the vault by 1593, but then became occupied with papal commissions; Cobaert produced a statue that was rejected, in part because it represented the Apostle without the traditional angel. This statue was later bought by the Archconfraternity of the Santissima Trinita` dei Pellegrini and placed in the chapel dedicated to their patron. In 1597, the money for the project was transferred to the Fabbrica di San Pietro, which administered the Church's buildings, yet producing no result. In 1599, preparations began for a Jubilee. "France...is not yet sufficiently cleansed from the thorns and weeds of heresy and corruption," the Pope had told his French bishops. The new French king, Henry IV, had recently converted from Protestantism to Catholicism, but much remained to be done. Conversion was to be the Pope's theme with regard to France. Alarmed by the fact that Rome would be overrun with French pilgrims, the prefect in charge of the Fabricca, and of the money, Cardinal Francesco Maria Del Monte, suggested that his own personal painter, Caravaggio, should be contracted to paint oils on canvas for the two side walls where Cesari would not put his murals.

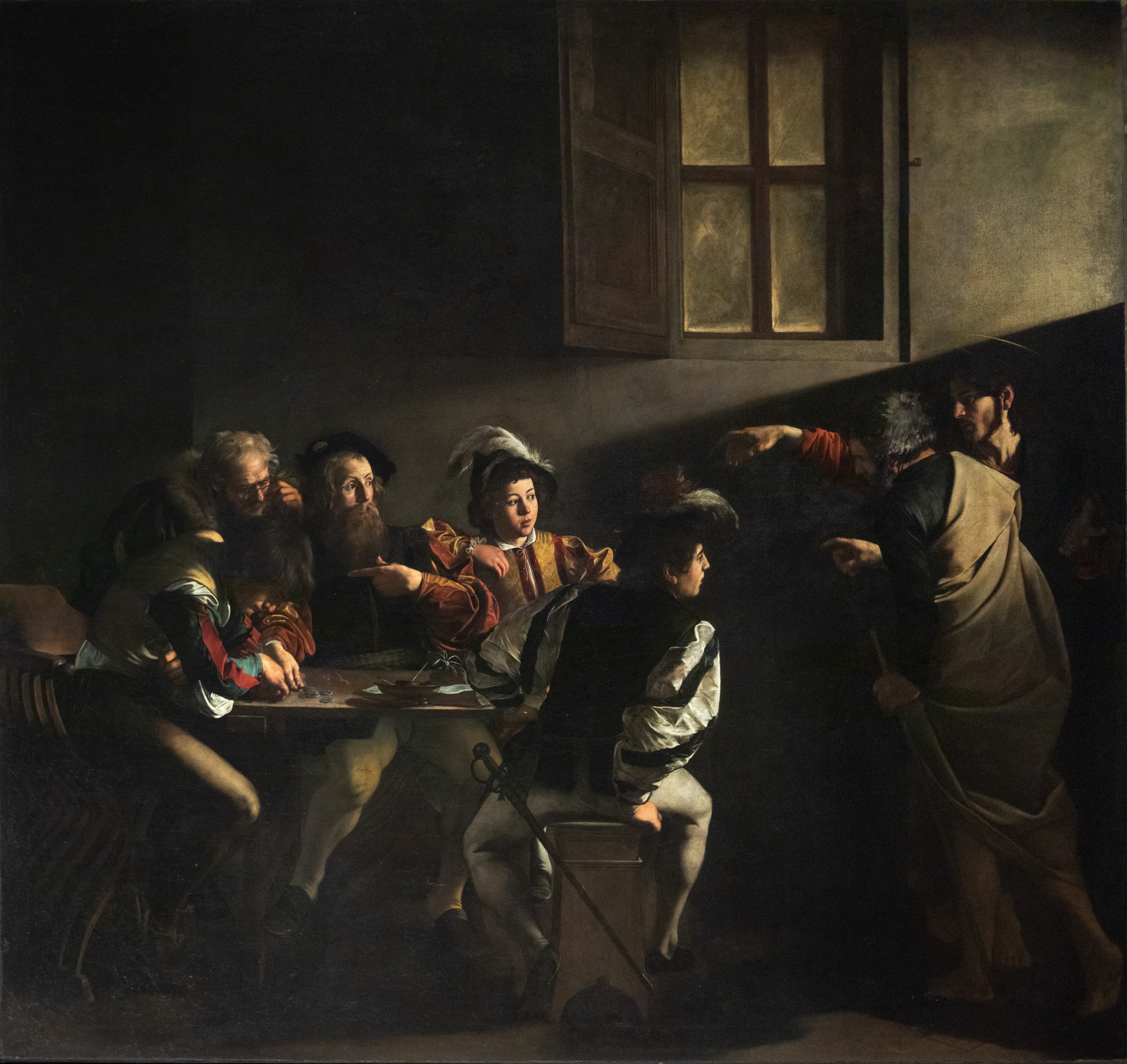
The Calling of St. Matthew, Caravaggio

The Martyrdom of St. Matthew, Caravaggio

The contract with Caravaggio was signed on 23 July 1599. Despite disagreements over the composition of the second painting, Caravaggio's The Calling of Saint Matthew and The Martyrdom of Saint Matthew were installed by July 1600. When Cobaert delivered his statues, the churchmen rejected them, and then commissioned Caravaggio to do another painting for the altarpiece, still following the Cardinal's original instructions. The third and final work, The Inspiration of Saint Matthew, was in place by 1602.

Caravaggio's solution to decorating a typically gloomy Roman church interior has been deemed noteworthy. Visitors to the Contarelli Chapel today are confronted with paintings that use the gloom for effect. Caravaggio also considered the lighting in the chapel, as each of the two side paintings are lit by a beam coming from the only source of natural light. The decorative cycle began with the painting on the left side of the chapel, invisible to the viewer when first entering the church. It is a large panel of the Calling of St. Matthew, one of Caravaggio's most well-known works. On the right of the composition, Jesus and St. Peter look directly at a seated Matthew, and Jesus points at Matthew, "Calling". His hand references the receiving hand of Adam in the Creation of Adam panel on the ceiling of the Sistine Chapel. Matthew and his companions, in contrast, are wearing robes concurrent with Caravaggio's time.

On the right side of the wall is the Martyrdom of St. Matthew, depicting the scene in which Matthew meets his end. In contrast to the relatively sedate Calling, this work is defined by action. At the center of the chapel is The Inspiration of Saint Matthew, a scene in which an angel dictates to St. Matthew the gospel. Although the three paintings by Caravaggio are today the star attraction of the chapel, the frescos by Cesari, who is considered by academics to have been overshadowed by Caravaggio, have been increasingly appreciated for their Mannerist style. The Cesari fresco was finished in c. 1593, at which point Caravaggio was working for Cesari.

== Sources ==
- John Gash, Caravaggio, 2003 ISBN 1-904449-22-0
- Helen Langdon, Caravaggio: A Life, 1998 ISBN 0-374-11894-9
- Peter Robb, M, 1998 ISBN 1-876631-79-1
