= Boy with a Basket of Fruit =

Painting by Caravaggio

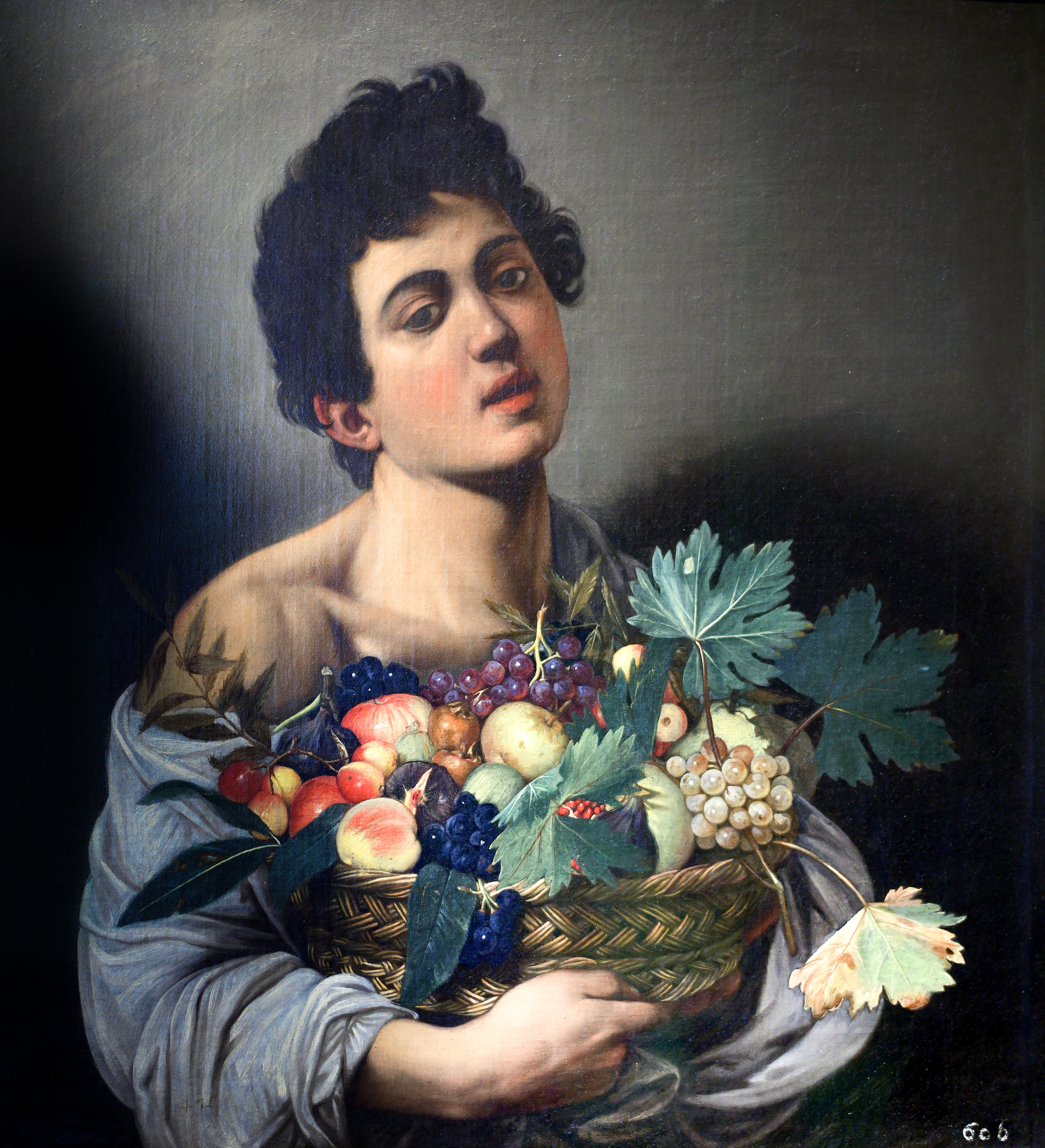
- Artist: Caravaggio
- Year: c. 1593
- Medium: Oil on canvas
- Dimensions: 70 cm × 67 cm (28 in × 26 in)
- Location: Galleria Borghese, Rome

Boy with a Basket of Fruit is an oil on canvas painting generally ascribed to Italian Baroque master Michelangelo Merisi da Caravaggio, created c. 1593. It is currently held in the Galleria Borghese in Rome.

== Background ==
The painting dates from the time when Caravaggio, newly arrived in Rome from his native Milan, was making his way in the competitive Roman art world. The model was his friend and companion, the Sicilian painter Mario Minniti, at about 16 years old. The work was in the collection of Giuseppe Cesari, the Cavalier d'Arpino, seized by Cardinal Scipione Borghese in 1607, and may therefore date to the period when Caravaggio worked for d'Arpino "painting flowers and fruits" in his workshop; but it may date from a slightly later period when Caravaggio and Minniti had left Cavalier d'Arpino's workshop (January 1594) to make their own way selling paintings through the dealer Costantino. Certainly it cannot predate 1593, the year Minniti arrived in Rome. It is believed to predate more complex works from the same period (also featuring Minniti as a model) such as The Fortune Teller and the Cardsharps (both 1594), the latter of which brought Caravaggio to the attention of his first important patron, Cardinal Francesco Maria del Monte. Vittorio Sgarbi notes certain Murillesque portraiture qualities in the painting that could easily point to other painters in the Arpino workshop.

== Iconography ==
Art writers noted several elements of the painting as dominant, either visually or thematically. Moir, for example, notes the key role that the contrast between light and shadow plays in the composition: a window placed high on the left allows a ray of light to penetrate the room, illuminating, as it slides over the wall, the boy, the lush fruit basket, the shirt sleeve, the sensual bare shoulder, and the languid face, while the shadow, the dark mark, is provided by the hair and the projection of the basket's shadow on the wall. As he writes, "the result is an emphasis on the tangibility of objects in the delicately veiled space, which confirms the visual illusion and at the same time the authenticity of the episode, which is no longer a creation of the painter's imagination but a transcription of his experience". The artwork's essential theme is therefore the showing of the tactile experience of "natural things." According to Gregori, "the artwork's subject is exactly that which appears to the viewer's eye: a young seller, with a basket, full of fruit mixed with still fresh leaves, the truth of which is exalted by the marvelous brilliance of the colors".

According to Bologna, Caravaggio takes all of nature—flowers, fruits, figures—as "the object of his brush," performing a wholly advanced operation: that of direct observation, the same that new scientists like Galileo "were conducting on the manifestations and structure of the natural world". Hermann Fiore believes that the artist also kept in mind the Latin tradition of xenia, gifts in the form of fruits and vegetables that in Roman aristocratic houses were offered to guests. K. Hermann Fiore stipulates that the young man may be a contemporary personification of the god Vertumnus.

=== Influences and context ===
Still life in Rome, at the time of Caravaggio's activity, grafted onto Northern European and Lombard experiences; the first significant Roman painting of the kind was Vegetables, Fruits and Flowers, attributed to the so-called Master of Hartford. It is dated to more or less post-1593 and also comes from the seizure of paintings made from Cavalier d'Arpino. Due to this provenance, some have wanted to associate this work with Caravaggio, but as diagnostic radiographic surveys have shown, it seems to be entirely foreign to him. The X-rays reveal many reworkings and corrections on the drawing, a technique entirely foreign to Caravaggio.

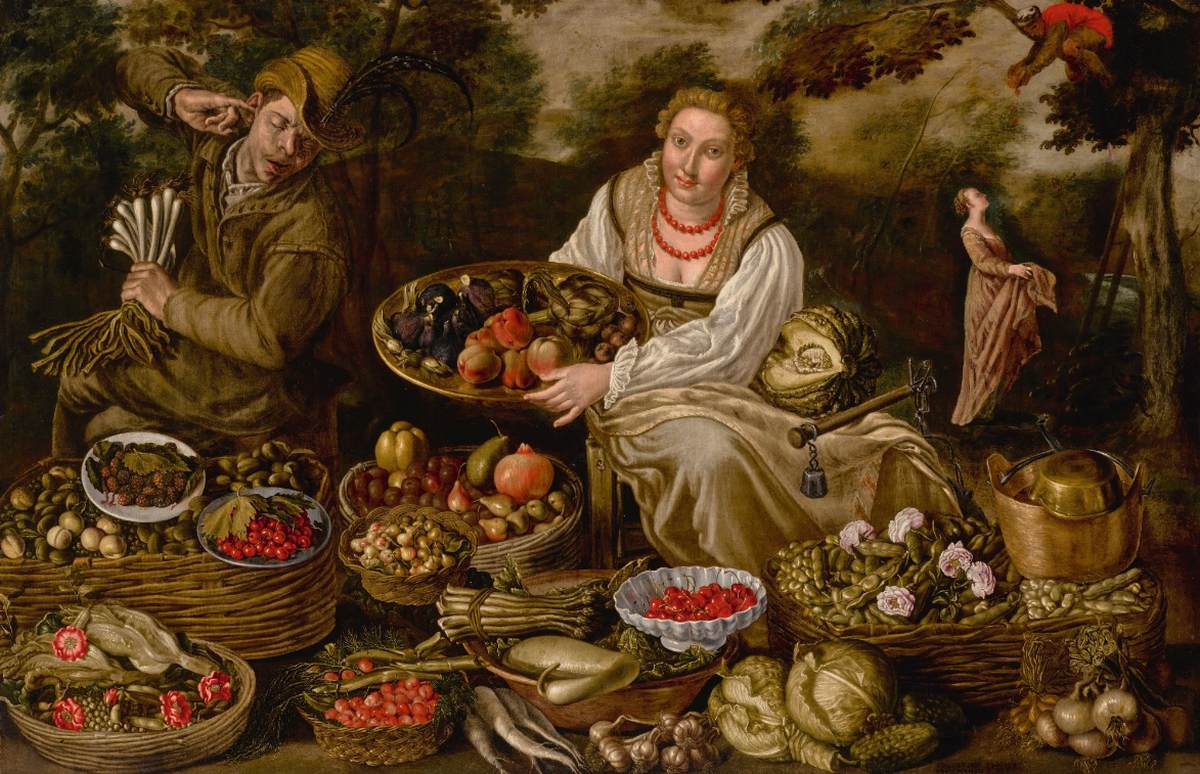
Vincenzo Campi's The Fruit and Vegetable Seller, one of Caravaggio's potential influences.

Other painters at the time, such as the Campi brothers or Carracci (in the latter's case, his "butcher shops" in particular) adopted a merely figurative interest for fruits and vegetables, usually in the context of depicting farmer's markets. The distinctiveness of Caravaggio's work is that he focusses his attention on the human figure associated with the displayed nature, looking with great realistic attention at individual objects and their tactile experience: consider the compactness of the apples, the roundness of the moist grape berries, the soft fleshiness of the figs, and how these features are complimented by the presentation of the titular seller.

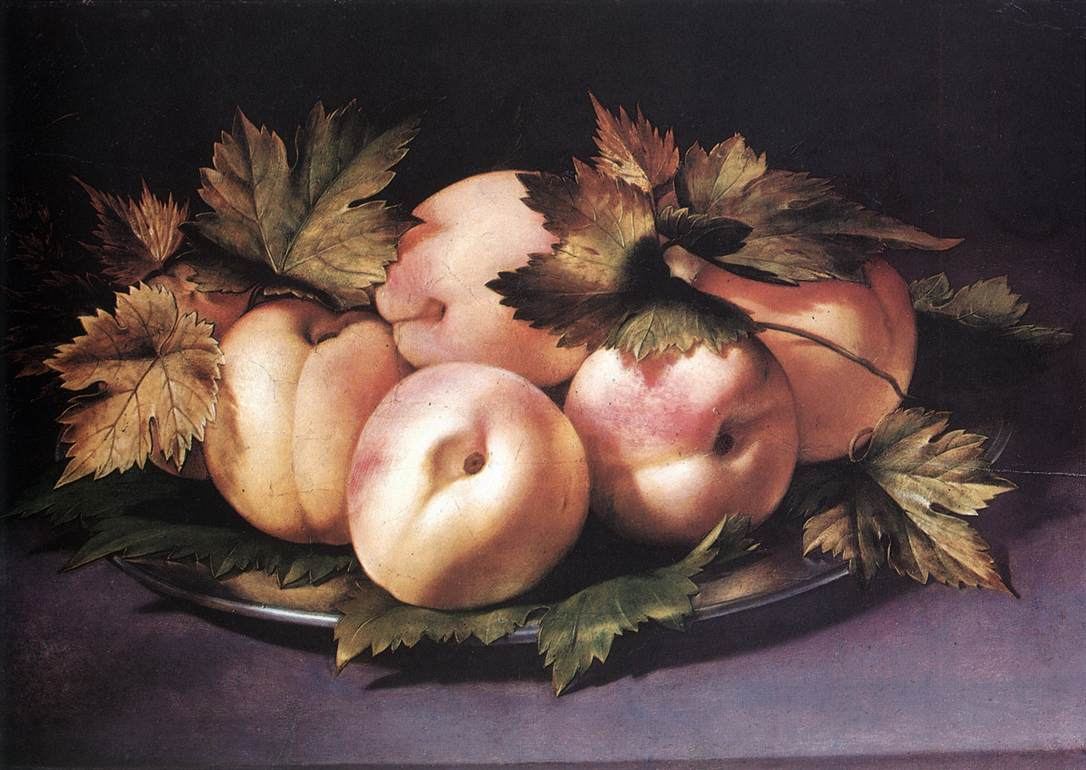
Giovanni Ambrogio Figino, Metal Plate with Peaches and Vine Leaves

During his time at the workshop of Peterzano in Milan, Caravaggio would certainly have had the opportunity to see and study the works of the Cremonese Campi brothers, who show, in more than one painting, the presence of the abundance of nature in the fruit and vegetable market; for example, in Vincenzo Campi's Fruit and Vegetable Seller of 1580. In the work, we see two characters: one female—the fruit seller—and one male, a helper. In front of them, an abundance of vegetables and both fresh and dried fruit. The painting has a dual function: on one hand, it shows the abundance and richness of the market, also with realistic attention; on the other, however, an erotic meaning is evident: the woman has a split pumpkin in her lap, while the man holds in his hand a bunch of leeks, which raise associations of virility. The male subject inserts a finger into his ear, which was a gesture with a sexual meaning. To complete the interpretation, in the background we can see a man on a tree who throws fruits into the lap of the woman below. It is an explicit sexual allegory in which gestures, images, and fruits have an erotic value, understandable to the audience of the time. A different use of horticultural motifs, however, has been achieved by Giovanni Ambrogio Figino in his Metal Plate with Peaches and Vine Leaves, datable to the late 1500s; similarly, the fruit presented on the painting is used to construct an allegory, but of a non-erotic quality. Rather, Figino explores theme of Vanitas, where next to vine leaves that are yellowing, the peaches seem to remain eternally ripe, maintaining a consistency that defies time and competes with the harder, indestructible material of the metal tray. Erotic symbolism and vanitas are thus already explored in these early examples of still life.

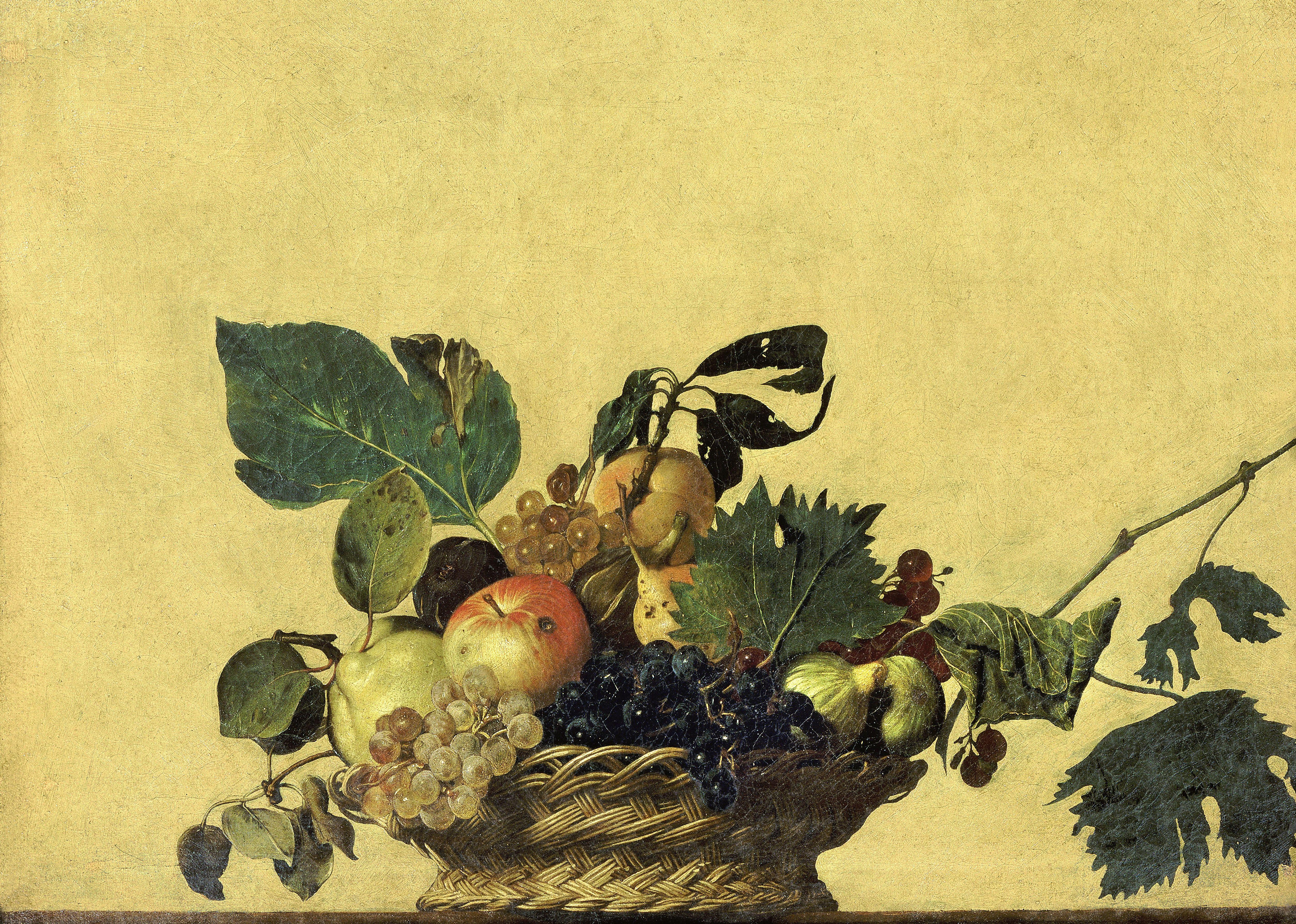
Caravaggio's Basket of Fruit. In this painting, the typical vanitas motifs of decay and passage of time are explored more explicitly than in the Boy with a Basket, through the presence of maggot holes, spots of fungus, and decay.

These themes can inform our reading Caravaggio's work. At first sight, he seems to be distinctly less interested the passage of time and vanitas in the Boy with a Basket of Fruit than in his other, more expressly vanitas-oriented works, such as the Basket of Fruit. Still, it could be said that the theme of decay in the Boy is explored through the reality of the objects themselves, rather than by employing expressly figurative elements, such as a skull or rotting fruit. Indeed, analysts have noticed that the fruits in the boy's basket bear disorders and imperfections; the sombre atmosphere and harsh lighting underlines the fleeting youthfulness of the subject.

The erotic motifs are not foreign to the Boy with a Basket either. The young man has a languid and feminine expression, his mouth half open, red lips, his face tilted to the left, flushed cheeks, the shoulder bare and exposed. A homoerotic reading leads to the assertion that the boy is not offering the fruit but himself; the abundance and goodness of the fruits make a pendant with the erotic goodness expressed by the young man. And in this sense, the basket held close to the chest could be a symbolic indication of lust. The basket is one of the attributes of the faun and alludes to lust, like the girdle of Venus, all symbolic cryptograms of Eros. But here too, the sign of time, of transience, is equally present; the fruits offered as gifts (and in this sense the young man himself) are transient, destined to end, like the yellowing leaf that bends down outside the basket.

These interpretations suggest that Caravaggio does not wholly depart from the Renaissance allegorical tradition; rather, he goes beyond it, investigating with concrete scrupulousness the forms inherent in nature. He shows their richness and extracts meaning through scrupulously observing and realistically representing the physical world.

== Horticulturalist analysis ==
At one level the painting is a genre piece designed to demonstrate the artist's ability to depict everything from the skin of the boy to the skin of a peach, from the folds of the robe to the weave of the basket. The fruit is especially exquisite, and Professor Jules Janick of the Department of Horticulture and Landscape Architecture at Purdue University, Indiana, has analysed them from a horticulturalist's perspective:

The basket ... contains a great many fruits, all in nearly perfect condition and including a bi-colored peach with a bright red blush; four clusters of grapes — two black, one red, and one "white;" a ripe pomegranate split open, disgorging its red seeds; four figs, two of them dead-ripe, black ones, both split and two light-colored; two medlars; three apples—two red, one blushed and the other striped, and one yellow with a russet basin and a scar; two branches with small pears, one of them with five yellow ones with a bright red cheek and the other, half-hidden, with small yellow, blushed fruits. There are also leaves showing various disorders: a prominent virescent grape leaf with fungal spots and another with a white insect egg mass resembling that of the oblique banded leaf roller (Choristoneura rosaceana), and peach leaves with various spots.

The analysis indicates that Caravaggio is being realistic. By capturing only what was in the fruit basket, he idealizes neither their ripeness nor their arrangement—yet almost miraculously, we are still drawn in to look at it, for the viewer it is very much a beautiful and exquisite subject.

== Pop culture ==
The painting was an inspiration for and is referenced by the 2019 album Girl with Basket of Fruit by American experimental band Xiu Xiu. It also served as the inspiration for Jesse Mockrin's portrait of Billie Eilish, commissioned by Vogue Magazine in February 2020.

== See also ==
- List of paintings by Caravaggio
