= The Fortune Teller (Caravaggio) =

Painting by Caravaggio

- Buona ventura (Italian)
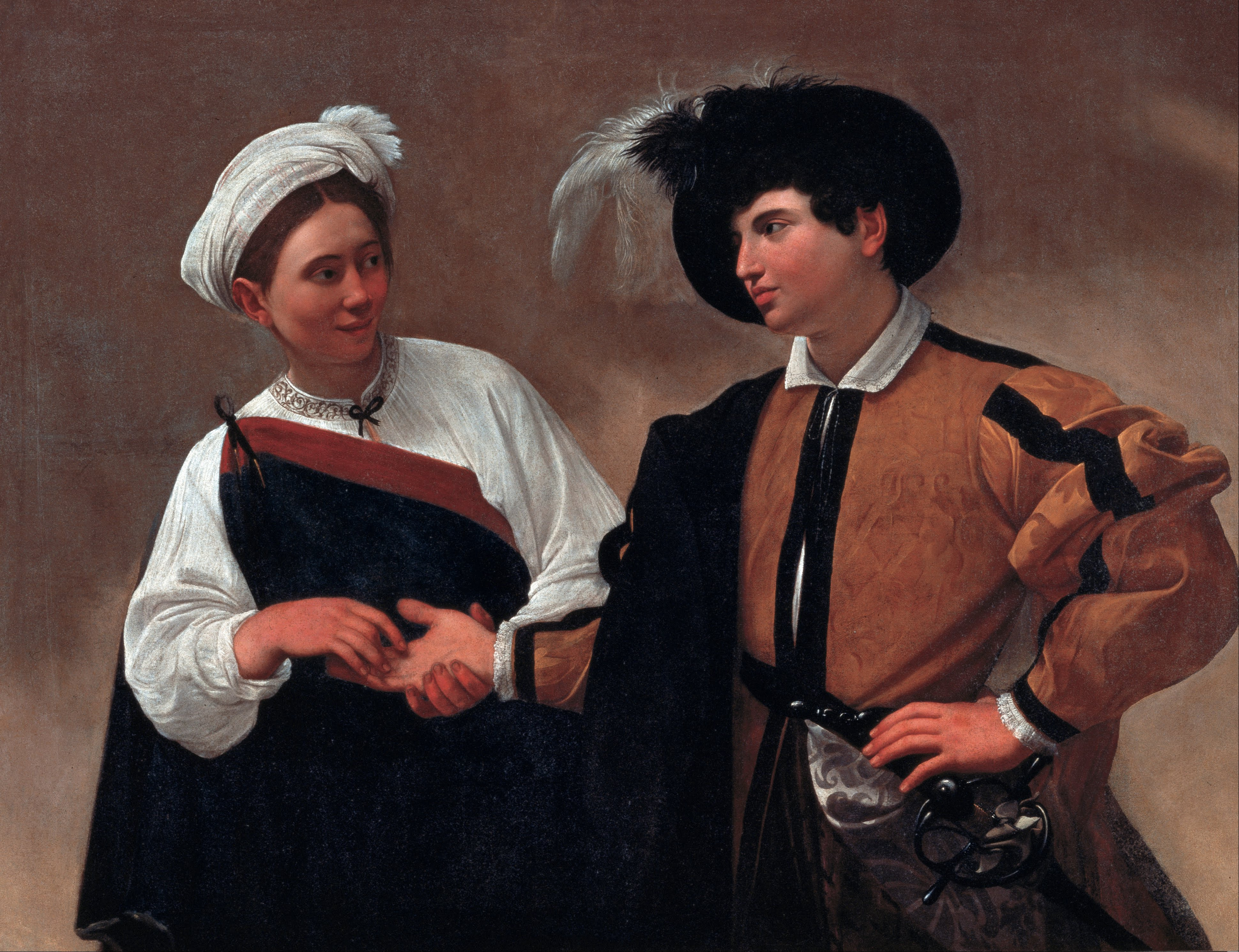
- first version
- Artist: Caravaggio
- Year: c. 1594
- Medium: Oil on canvas
- Dimensions: 115 cm × 150 cm (45 in × 59 in)
- Location: Musei Capitolini, Rome

The Fortune Teller
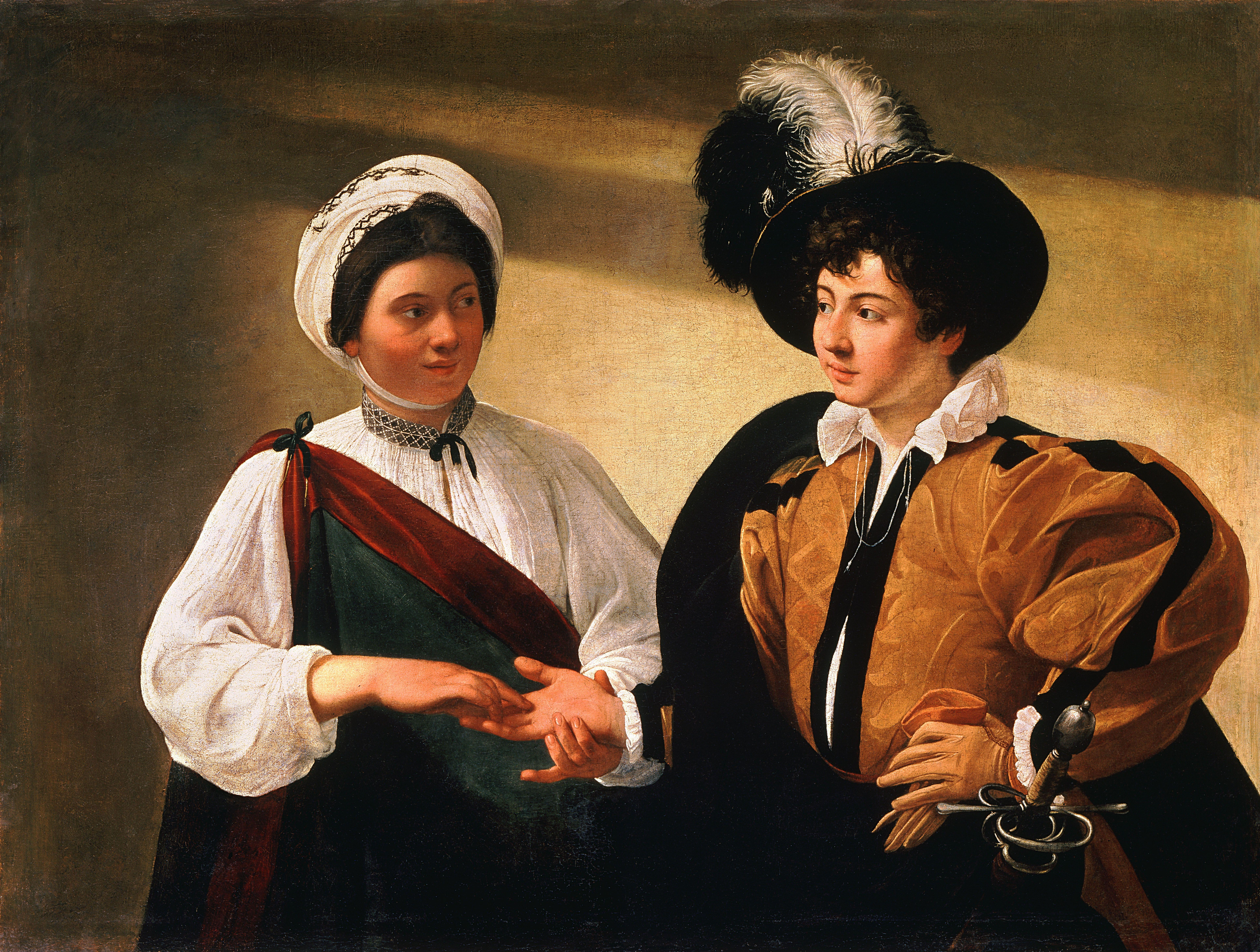
- second version
- Artist: Caravaggio
- Year: c. 1595
- Medium: Oil on canvas
- Dimensions: 93 cm × 131 cm (37 in × 52 in)
- Location: Louvre, Paris

The Fortune Teller is a painting by Italian Baroque artist Michelangelo Merisi da Caravaggio. It exists in two versions, both by Caravaggio, the first from c. 1594 (now in the Musei Capitolini in Rome), the second from c. 1595 (which is in the Louvre museum, Paris). The dates in both cases are disputed.

== Subject matter ==
The painting shows a foppishly-dressed boy (in the second version the model is believed to be Caravaggio's companion, the Sicilian painter Mario Minniti), having his palm read by a Romani girl. The boy looks pleased as he gazes into her face, and she returns his gaze. Close inspection of the painting reveals what the young man has failed to notice: the girl appears to be removing his ring as she gently strokes his hand.

== Fortune teller's deceit as a metaphor ==
Caravaggio's painting, of which two versions exist, shows a well-groomed, vain young man having his palm read by a Romani woman. The wily Romani woman is guilty of deceit, however: her seductive smile is false, and because the young man has been charmed off his feet by her beauty, he does not notice that she has meanwhile slipped the ring from his finger. In 1603 the poet Gaspare Murtola dedicated a madrigal to Caravaggio's Fortune Teller, in which he compares the deceit of the sensuous Romani woman with the illusionistic manner of Caravaggio, therefore implying that the viewer, like the young man, is the victim of duplicity. The madrigal is addressed to Caravaggio himself: 'Non so qual sia più maga / O la donna, che fingi, / O tu che la dipingi. / Di rapir quella è vaga / Coi dolci incanti suoi / Il core e 'l sangue a noi. Tu dipinta, che appare / Fai, che viva si veda. Fai, che viva, e spirante altri / la creda.'

(I don't know who is the greater sorcerer / The woman you portray / Or you who paint her. Through sweetest incantation / She doth desire to steal / Our very heart and blood. Thou wouldst in thy portrayal / Her living, breathing image / For others reproduce, That they too may believe it.)

== Style ==
Caravaggio's biographer Giovanni Pietro Bellori relates that the artist picked the Romani girl out from passers-by on the street in order to demonstrate that he had no need to copy the works of the masters from antiquity:

"When he was shown the most famous statues of Phidias and Glykon in order that he might use them as models, his only answer was to point towards a crowd of people saying that nature had given him an abundance of masters."

This passage is often used to demonstrate that the classically trained Mannerist artists of Caravaggio's day disapproved of Caravaggio's insistence on painting from life instead of from copies and drawings made from older masterpieces. However, Bellori ends by saying, "and in these two half-figures [Caravaggio] translated reality so purely that it came to confirm what he said." The story is probably apocryphal – Bellori was writing more than half a century after Caravaggio's death, and it doesn't appear in Mancini's or in Giovanni Baglione, the two contemporary biographers who had known him – but it does indicate the essence of Caravaggio's revolutionary impact on his contemporaries – beginning with The Fortune Teller – which was to replace the Renaissance theory of art as a didactic fiction with art as the representation of real life.

== Second version ==
The 1594 Fortune Teller aroused considerable interest among younger artists and the more avant garde collectors of Rome, but, according to Giulio Mancini, Caravaggio's poverty forced him to sell it for the low sum of eight scudi. It entered the collection of a wealthy banker and connoisseur, the Marchese Vincente Giustiniani, who became an important patron of the artist. Giustiniani's friend, Cardinal Francesco Maria del Monte, purchased the companion piece, Cardsharps, in 1595, and at some point in that year Caravaggio entered the Cardinal's household.

For del Monte, Caravaggio painted a second version of The Fortune Teller, copied from the Giustiniani but with certain changes. The undifferentiated background of the 1594 version becomes a real wall broken by the shadows of a half-drawn curtain and a window sash, and the figures more completely fill the space and defining it in three dimensions. The light is more radiant, and the cloth of the boy's doublet and the girl's sleeves more finely textured. The dupe becomes more childlike and more innocently vulnerable, the girl less wary-looking, leaning in towards him, more in command of the situation.

== Genre ==
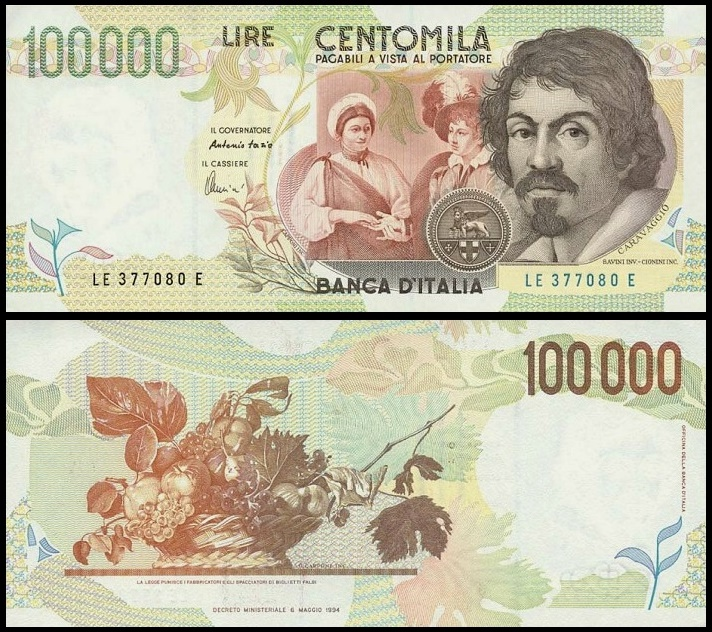
Italian lira banknote depicting Caravaggio and his painting, 1990 issue

The Fortune Teller is one of two known genre pieces painted by Caravaggio in the year 1594, the other being Cardsharps. The Fortune Teller is believed to be the earlier of the two, and dates from the period during which the artist had recently left the workshop of the Giuseppe Cesari to make his own way selling paintings through the dealer Costantino.

The subject of the painting was not unprecedented. In his Lives of the Artists, Giorgio Vasari notes that one of Franciabigio's followers, his brother Agnolo, painted a sign for a perfumer's shop "containing a gipsy woman telling the fortune of a lady in a very graceful manner".

== See also ==
- List of paintings by Caravaggio
