= 1608 in art =

Events from the year 1608 in art.

== Events ==
- August - Caravaggio is arrested and imprisoned for his part in a brawl. He subsequently escapes and flees Malta.
- December 1 - The senior Knights of Malta, after verifying that Caravaggio has failed to appear before them although summoned four times, vote unanimously to expel their putridum et foetidum ex-brother.
- Hendrick Avercamp moves from Amsterdam to Kampen.
- Mesrop of Khizan paints a Gospel.

== Paintings ==
Caravaggio, The Beheading of Saint John the Baptist

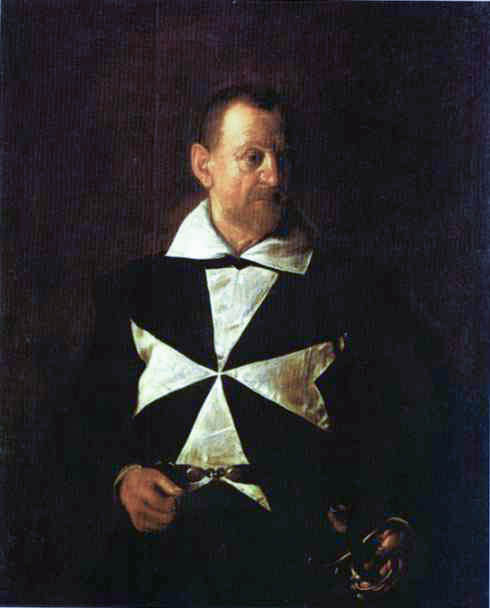
Caravaggio, Portrait of Fra Antonio Martelli

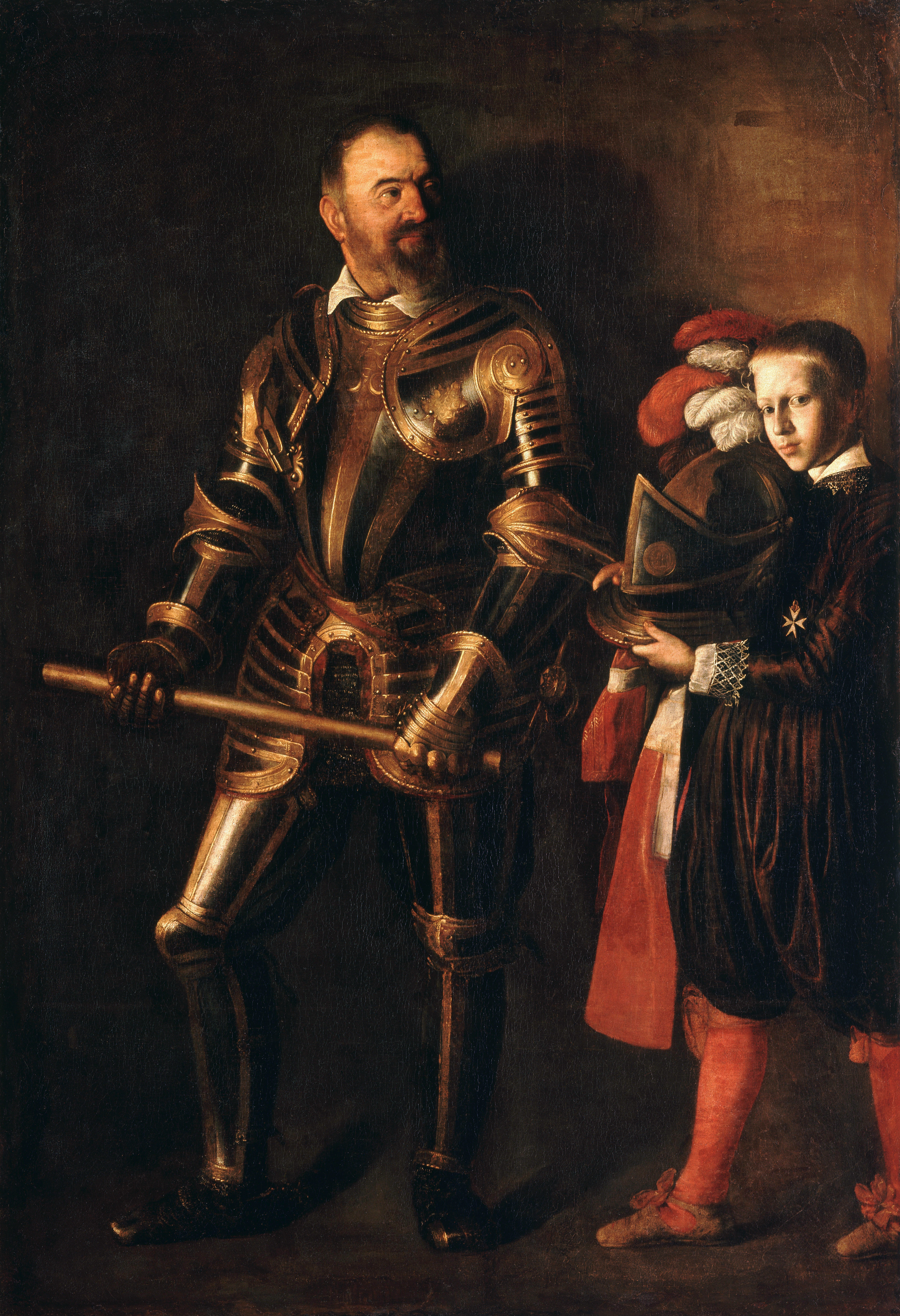
Caravaggio, Portrait of Alof de Wignacourt and his Page

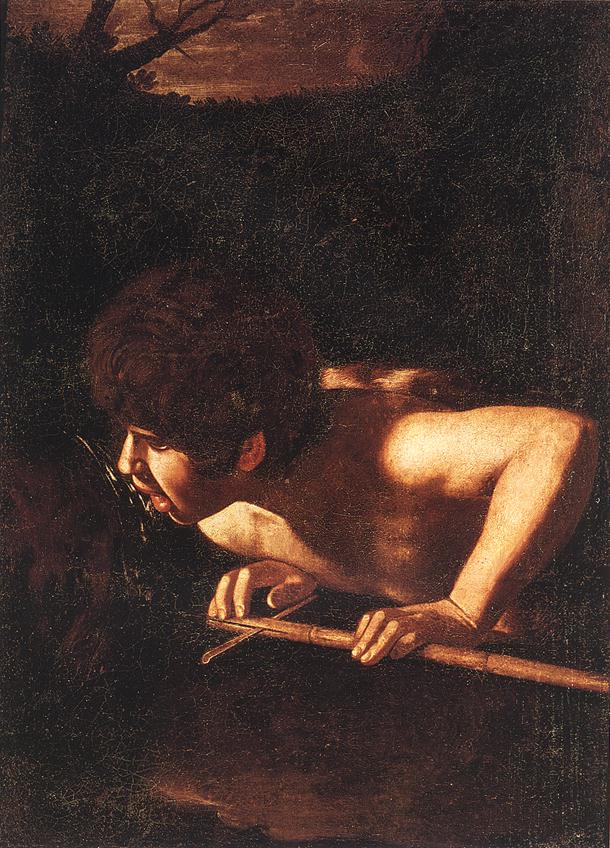
Caravaggio, John the Baptist (St John the Baptist at the Fountain)

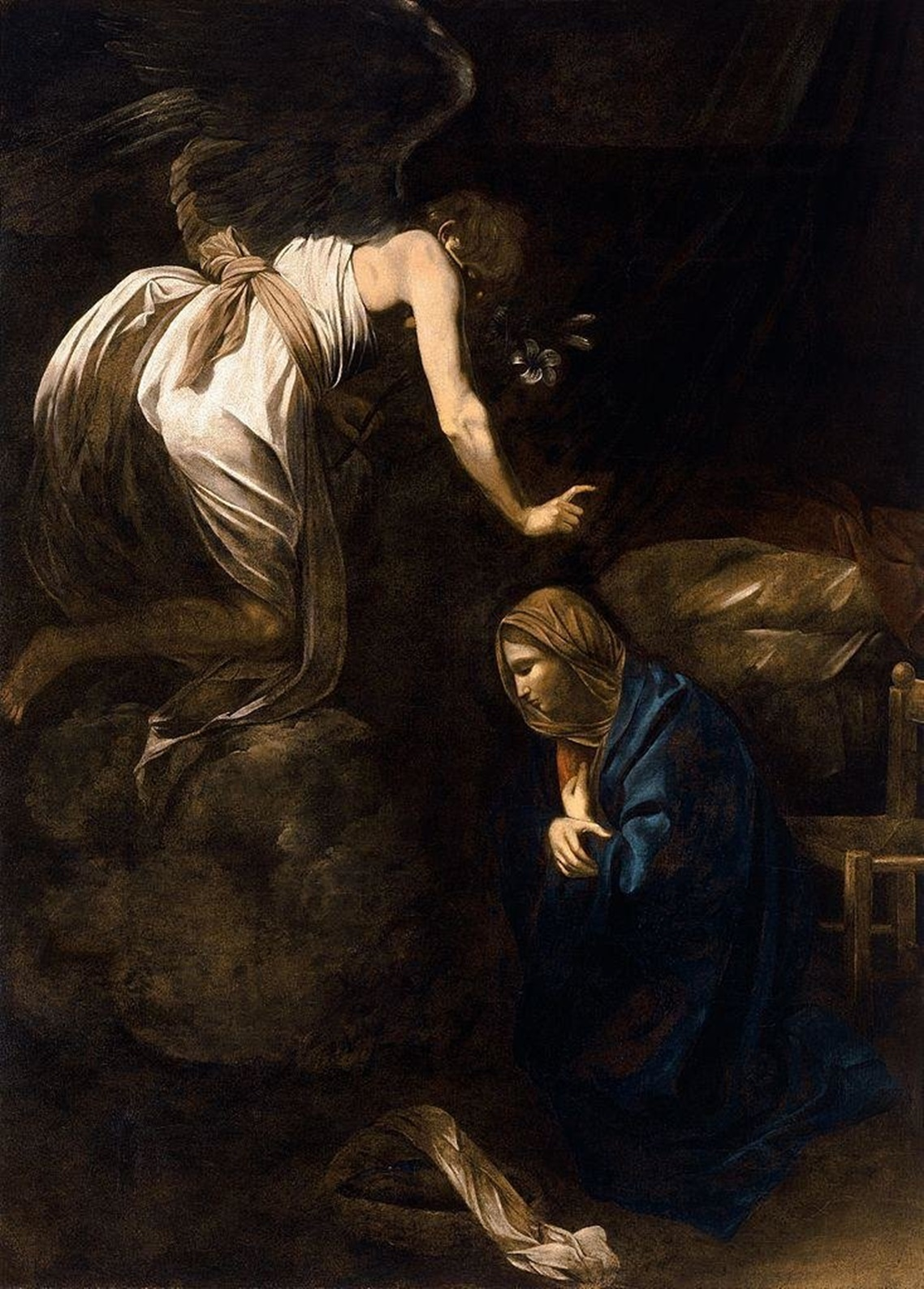
Caravaggio, Annunciation

Caravaggio, Burial of St. Lucy

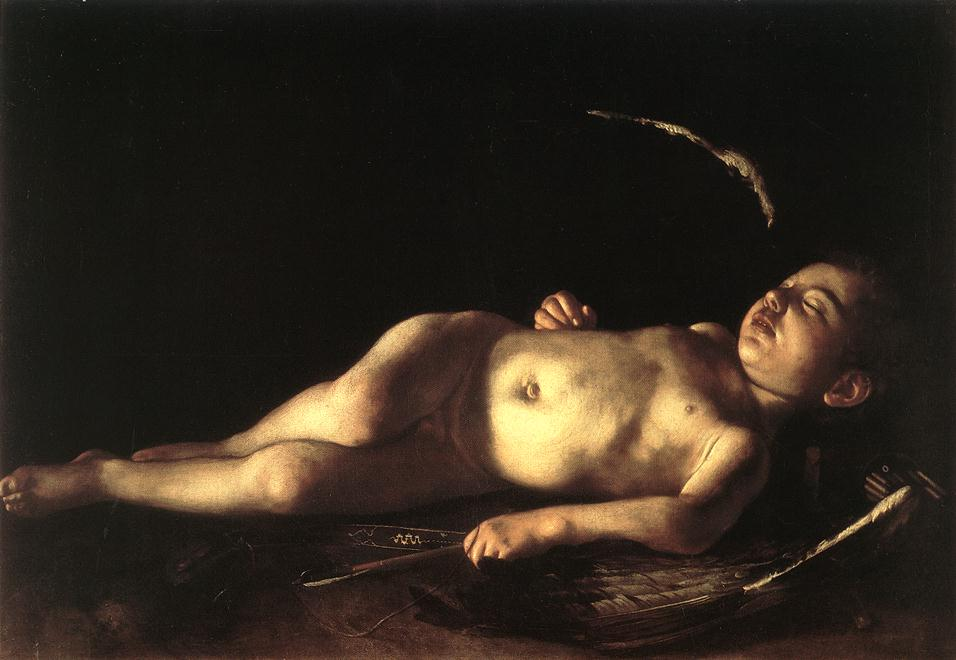
Caravaggio, Sleeping Cupid
- Hendrick Avercamp - Winter Landscape with Iceskaters (approximate date)
- Caravaggio
  - The Beheading of Saint John the Baptist
  - Portrait of Fra Antonio Martelli
  - Portrait of Alof de Wignacourt and his Page (1607–08)
  - Sleeping Cupid
  - John the Baptist (St John the Baptist at the Fountain)
  - Annunciation
  - Burial of St. Lucy
- Marcus Gheeraerts the Younger - Portrait of a boy aged two
- Frans Pourbus the Younger - Marguerite of Savoy, Duchess of Gonzaga, Duchess of Mantua
- Carlo Saraceni - Landscape with Salmacis and Hermaphroditus (approximate date)

== Births ==
- April/May - Pieter Post, Dutch architect, painter and printmaker (died 1669)
- October 30 - Lazzaro Morelli, sculptor (died 1690)
- date unknown
  - Salvi Castellucci, Italian painter active in Arezzo (died 1672)
  - Niccolo Laniere, Italian painter and engraver (died 1646)
  - Willem de Poorter, Dutch painter (died 1648)
  - Francisco Salmerón, Spanish painter (died 1632)
  - Giacomo Torelli, Italian set designer and engraver (died 1678)
  - Pieter van Abeele, Dutch medallist and coiner in Amsterdam (died 1684)
  - Abraham Wuchters, Dutch-Danish painter and engraver (died 1682)
- (born 1608/1612): Giovanni Stefano Danedi, Italian painter of frescoes (died 1690)
- (born 1608/1618): Ginevra Cantofoli, Italian painter (died 1672)

== Deaths ==
- June - Bernardo Buontalenti, Italian stage designer, architect, theatrical designer, military engineer and artist (born 1536)
- June 5 - Ippolito Andreasi, Italian painter (born 1548)
- July 26 - Pablo de Céspedes, Spanish painter, poet, and architect (born 1538)
- August 13 - Giambologna, Flemish sculptor of marble and bronze statuary working in Italy (born 1529)
- October 11 – Giovanni Ambrogio Figino, Italian painter (born c.1549/1551)
- October 26 - Juan Pantoja de la Cruz, Spanish painter (born 1553)
- November 14 - Bartolomeo Carducci, Italian painter (born 1560)
- date unknown
  - Felice Damiani, Italian painter of religious themed works and altarpieces (born 1584)
  - Kanō Mitsunobu, Japanese painter of the Kanō school (born unknown)
  - Pieter van der Borcht the Elder, Flemish Renaissance painter and etcher (born 1535 or 1545)
  - Alessandro Vittoria, Italian Mannerist sculptor of the Venetian school (born 1525)
