= John the Baptist (Caravaggio) =

Subject of eight paintings by Caravaggio

John the Baptist (sometimes called John in the Wilderness) was the subject of at least eight paintings by the Italian Baroque artist Michelangelo Merisi da Caravaggio (1571–1610).

The story of John the Baptist is told in the Gospels. John was the cousin of Jesus, and his calling was to prepare the way for the coming of the Messiah. He lived in the wilderness of Judea between Jerusalem and the Dead Sea, "his raiment of camel's hair, and a leather girdle about his loins; and his meat was locusts and wild honey." He baptised Jesus in the Jordan, and was eventually killed by Herod Antipas when he called upon the king to reform his evil ways. John was frequently shown in Christian art, identifiable by his bowl, reed cross, camel's skin and lamb. The most popular scene prior to the Counter-Reformation was of John's baptism of Jesus, or else the infant Baptist together with the infant Jesus and Mary his mother, frequently supplemented by the Baptist's own mother St Elizabeth. John alone in the desert was less popular, but not unknown. For the young Caravaggio, John was invariably a boy or youth alone in the wilderness. This image was based on the statement in the Gospel of Luke that "the child grew and was strengthened in spirit, and was in the deserts until the day of his manifestation to Israel." These works allowed a religious treatment of the partly clothed youths he liked to paint at this period.

Apart from these works showing John alone, mostly dated to his early years, Caravaggio painted three great narrative scenes of John's death: the great Execution in Malta, and two sombre Salomes with his head, one in Madrid, and one in London.

== John the Baptist, Toledo ==
John the Baptist (John in the Wilderness)
- San Giovanni Battista (Italian)
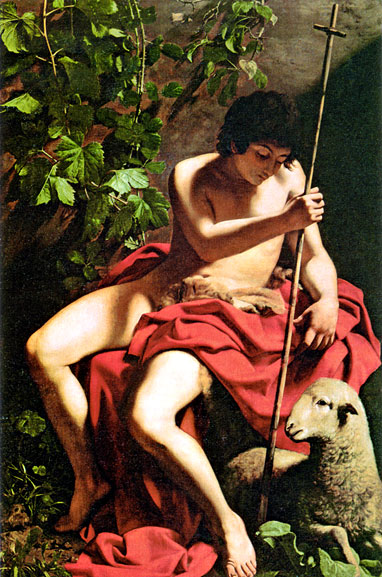
- Artist: Caravaggio (disputed)
- Year: c. 1598
- Medium: Oil on canvas
- Dimensions: 169 cm × 112 cm (67 in × 44 in)
- Location: Museo Tesoro Catedralicio, Toledo

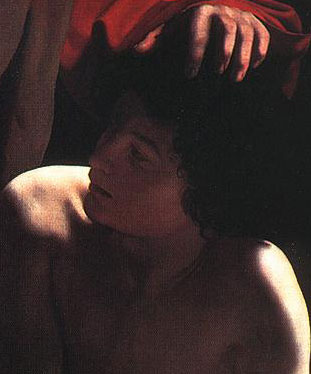
Sacrifice of Isaac, Caravaggio, c. 1598 (detail showing the head of Isaac). Private collection, Princeton, New Jersey – the resemblance between the two heads suggests that the disputed John the Baptist in Toledo is by the same artist.

The ascription of this painting to Caravaggio is disputed – the alternative candidate is Bartolomeo Cavarozzi, an early follower. It is in the collection of the Museo Tesoro Catedralicio, Toledo, Spain), and John Gash speculates that it may have been one of the paintings done by Caravaggio for the prior of the Hospital of the Consolation, as Caravaggio's early biographer Giulio Mancini tells us. According to Mancini the Prior "afterwards took them with him to his homeland"; unfortunately, one version of Mancini's manuscript says the Prior's homeland was Seville, while another says Sicily. There was a Spanish prior of the hospital in 1593, and he may not have left until June 1595. Gash cites scholar Alfonso Pérez Sánchez's view that while the figure of the saint has certain affinities with Cavarozzi's style, the rest of the picture does not, "and the extremely high quality of certain passages, especially the beautifully depicted vine leaves...is much more characteristic of Caravaggio." Gash also points to the gentle chiaroscuro and the delicate treatment of contours and features, and similar stylistic features in early works by Caravaggio such as The Musicians and Saint Francis of Assisi in Ecstasy. If this and other paintings by Caravaggio were indeed in Seville at an early date they may have influenced Velázquez in his early works. However, the arguments in favour of Cavarozzi are strong, and he is known to have travelled to Spain about 1617–1619.

Peter Robb, taking the painting to be by Caravaggio, dates it to about 1598, when the artist was a member of the household of his first patron, Cardinal Francesco Maria del Monte. Robb points out that the Baptist is evidently the same boy who modelled for Isaac in the Sacrifice of Isaac, which would date both paintings to around the same period. Unfortunately this Sacrifice of Isaac is also disputed, and so the problem of authorship is not solved. John is shown against a background of green grape vines and thorny vine stems, seated on a red cloak, holding a thin reed cross and looking down at a sheep lying at his feet. The red cloak would become a staple of Caravaggio's works, one with many precedents in previous art.

John the Baptist carries over many of the concerns which animated Caravaggio's other work from this period. The leaves behind the figure, and the plants and soil around his feet, are depicted with that careful, almost photographic sense of detail which is seen in the contemporary still life Basket of Fruit, while the melancholy self-absorption of the Baptist creates an atmosphere of introspection. The grape leaves stand for the grapes from which the wine of the Last Supper was pressed, while the thorns call to mind the Crown of Thorns, and the sheep is a reminder of the Sacrifice of Christ.

Caravaggio's decision to paint John the Baptist as a youth was somewhat unusual for the age: the saint was traditionally shown as either an infant, together with the infant Jesus and possibly his own and Jesus's mother, or as an adult, frequently in the act of baptising Jesus. Nevertheless, it was not totally without precedent. Leonardo had painted a youthful and enigmatically smiling Baptist with one finger pointing upwards and the other hand seeming to indicate his own breast, while Andrea del Sarto left a Baptist which almost totally prefigures Caravaggio. Both Leonardo and del Sarto had created from the figure of John something which seems to hint at an entirely personal meaning, one not accessible to the viewer, and Caravaggio was to turn this into something like a personal icon in the course of his many variations on the theme.

== John the Baptist (Youth with a Ram), Musei Capitolini, Rome, and Doria Pamphilj Gallery, Rome ==
John the Baptist (Youth with a Ram)
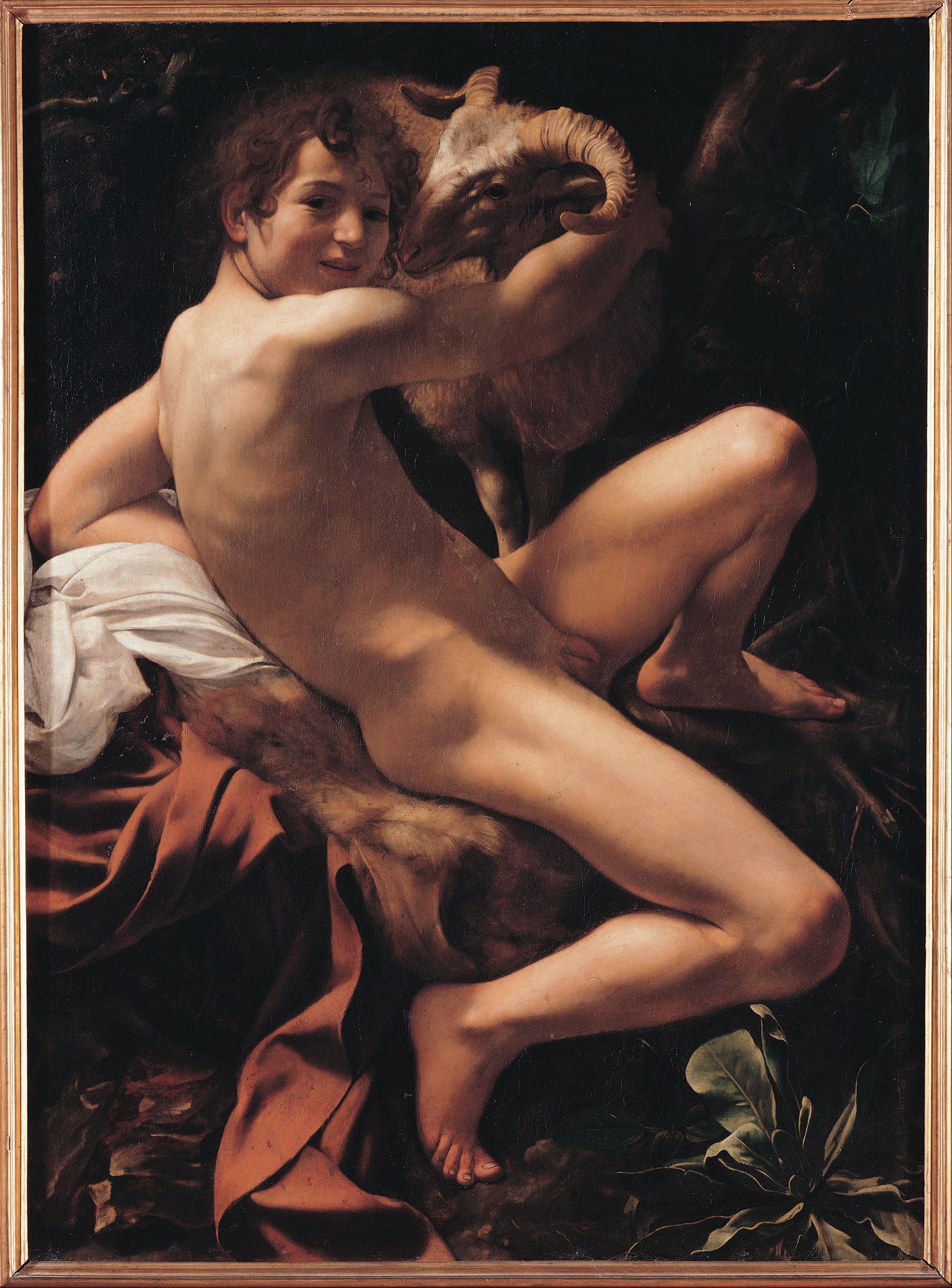
- Artist: Caravaggio
- Year: 1602
- Medium: Oil on canvas
- Dimensions: 129 cm × 94 cm (51 in × 37 in)
- Location: Musei Capitolini, Rome

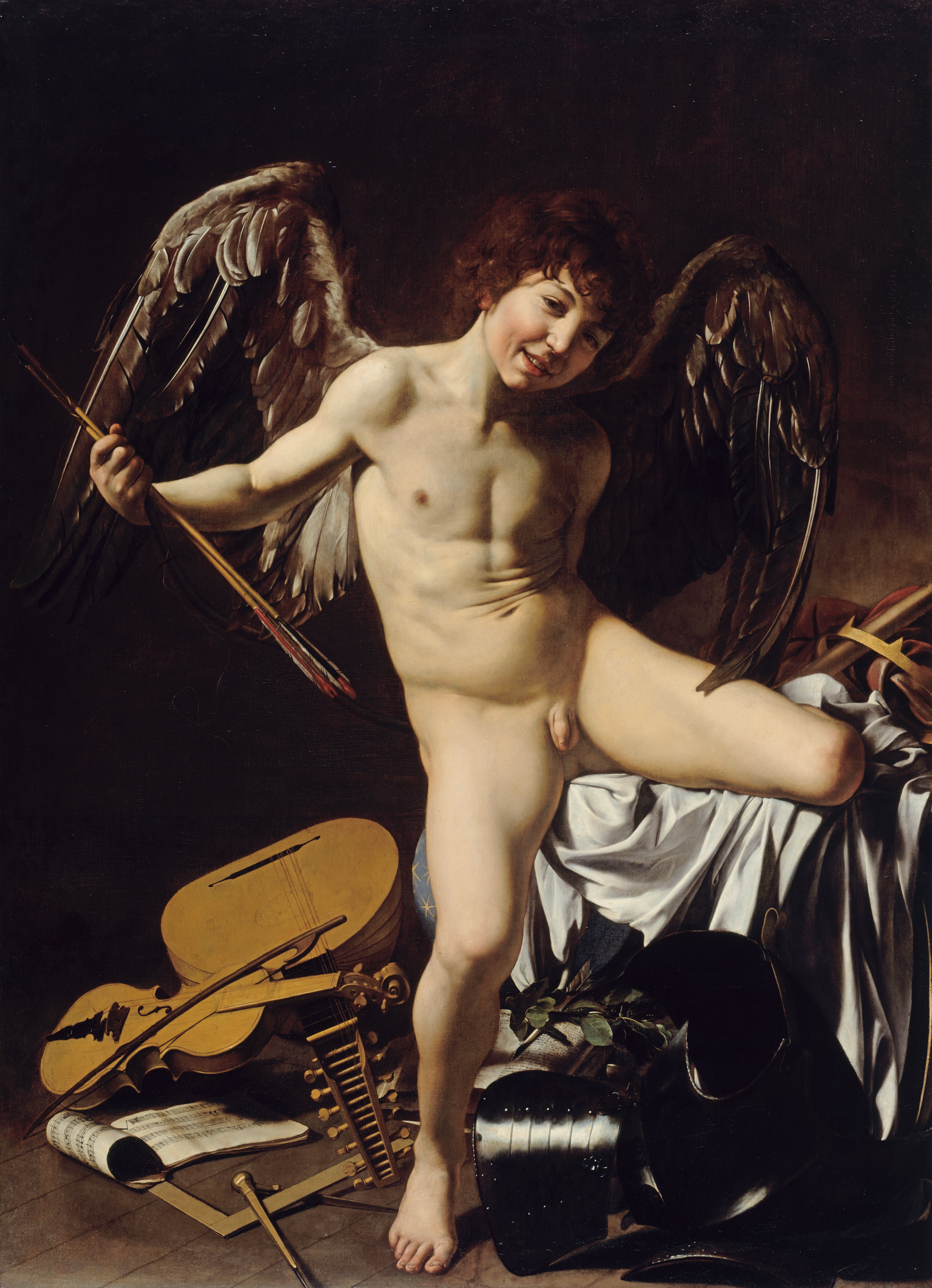
Amor Vincit Omnia, Caravaggio, c. 1602. Gemäldegalerie, Berlin.

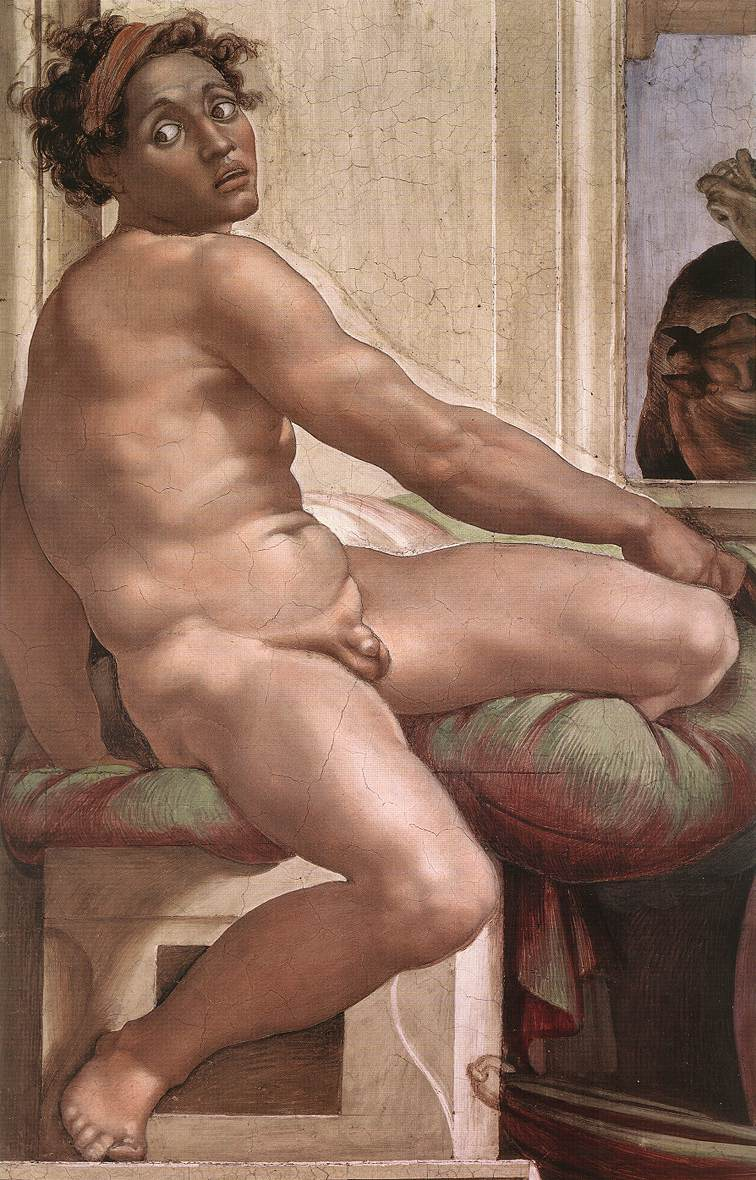
Ignudo by Michelangelo, c. 1508–1512. Sistine Chapel, Rome.

The model for Amor Vincit was a boy named Cecco, Caravaggio's servant and possibly his pupil as well. He has been tentatively identified with an artist active in Rome about 1610–1625, otherwise known only as Cecco del Caravaggio – Caravaggio's Cecco – who painted very much in Caravaggio's style. The most striking feature of Amor was the young model's evident glee in posing for the painting, so that it became rather more a portrait of Cecco than a depiction of a Roman demi-god. The same sense of the real-life model overwhelming the supposed subject was transferred to Mattei's John the Baptist. The youthful John is shown half-reclining, one arm around a ram's neck, his face turned to the viewer with an impish grin. There's almost nothing to signify that this indeed the prophet sent to make straight the road in the wilderness – no cross, no leather belt, just a scrap of camel's skin lost in the voluminous folds of the red cloak, and the ram. The ram itself is highly un-canonical – John the Baptist's animal is supposed to be a lamb, marking his greeting of Christ as the 'Lamb of God' come to take away the sins of mankind. The ram is as often a symbol of lust as of sacrifice, and this naked smirking boy conveys no sense of sin whatsoever. Some biographers have tried to depict Caravaggio as an essentially orthodox Catholic of the Counter-Reformation, but Cecco the Baptist seems as irredeemably pagan as his previous incarnation as Cupid.

John the Baptist (Youth with a Ram), c. 1602, 129x94 cm, Doria Pamphilj Gallery, Rome.

The Mattei Baptist proved immensely popular – eleven known copies were made, including one recognised by scholars as being from Caravaggio's own hand. It is today held in the Doria Pamphilj Gallery on the Roman Corso. (The gallery also houses his Penitent Magdalene and Rest on the Flight into Egypt). The collectors ordering the copies would have been aware of a further level of irony: the pose adopted by the model is a clear imitation of that adopted by one of Michelangelo's famous ignudi on the ceiling of the Sistine Chapel (painted 1508-1512). The role of these gigantic male nudes in Michelango's depiction of the world before the Laws of Moses has always been unclear – some have supposed them to be angels, others that they represent the Neo-Platonic ideal of human beauty – but for Caravaggio to pose his adolescent assistant as one of the Master's dignified witnesses to the Creation was clearly a kind of in-joke for the cognoscenti.

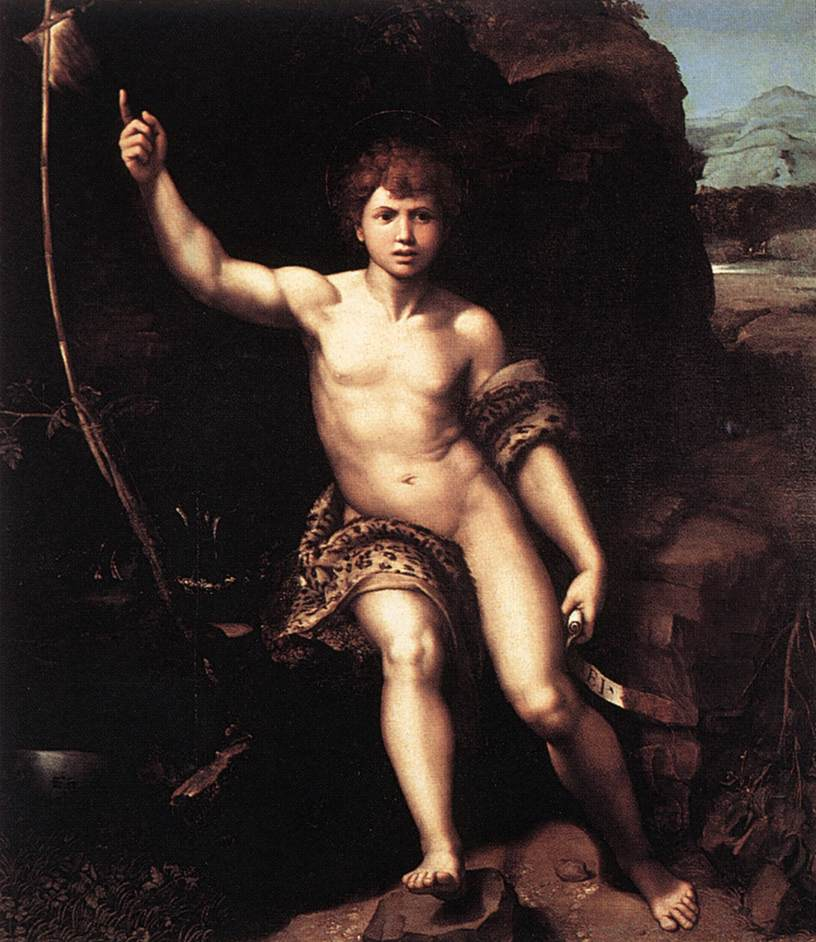
Saint John the Baptist, c. 1518, by Raphael – a precedent for Caravaggio's treatment of the Baptist

In 1601/02 Caravaggio was apparently living and painting in the palazzo of the Mattei family, inundated with commissions from wealthy private clients following the success of the Contarelli Chapel where in 1600 he had displayed The Martyrdom of Saint Matthew and The Calling of Saint Matthew. It was one of the most productive periods in a productive career. Ciriaco Mattei's notebook records two payments to Caravaggio in July and December of that year, marking the beginning and completion of the original John the Baptist. The payment was a relatively modest 85 scudi, because John was a single figure. The copy may have been made at the same time or very soon after. In January of that year Caravaggio received a hundred and fifty scudi for Supper at Emmaus. For Vincenzo Giustiniani there was The Incredulity of Saint Thomas, and in January 1603 Ciriaco paid a hundred and twenty-five scudi for The Taking of Christ. Each of these increased the immense popularity of Caravaggio among collectors – twenty copies survive of the Supper at Emmaus, more of the Taking of Christ.

But for all this success, neither the Church itself, nor any of the religious Orders, had yet commissioned anything. The paintings in the Contarelli Chapel had been commissioned and paid for by private patrons, although the priests of San Luigi dei Francesi (which contains the chapel) had had to approve the result. Caravaggio's problem was that the Counter-Reformation Church was extremely conservative – there had been a move to introduce an Index of Prohibited Images, and high-ranking cardinals had published handbooks guiding artists, and more especially the priests who might commission artists or approve art, on what was and was not acceptable. And the playful crypto-paganism of this private John the Baptist with its cross-references to the out of favour Classicising humanism of Michelangelo and the High Renaissance, most certainly was not acceptable.

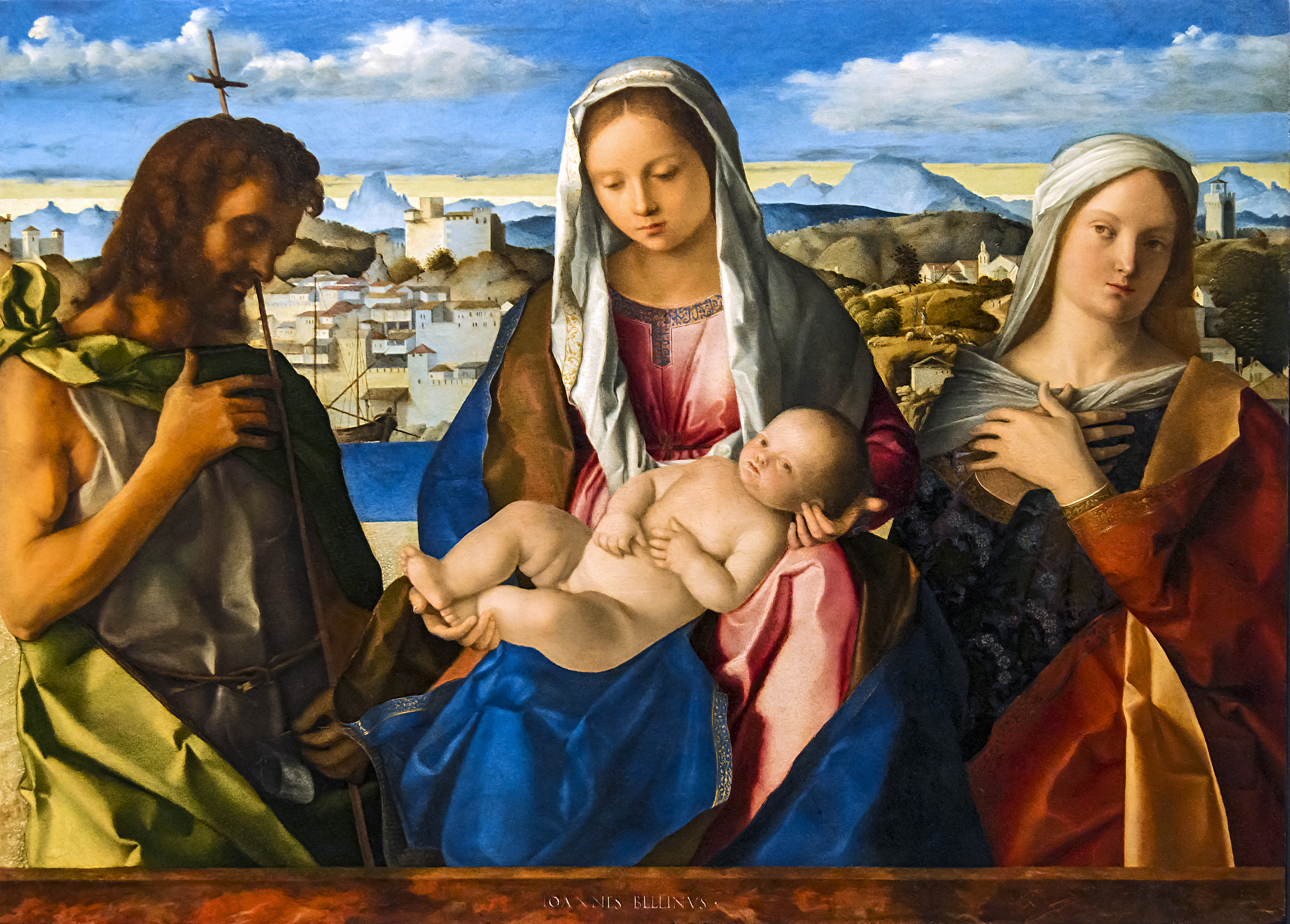
Madonna and Child with St. John the Baptist and Saint by Giovanni Bellini, c. 1500–1504. Gallerie dell'Accademia, Venice.

== John the Baptist, Kansas City, Missouri ==
John the Baptist (John in the Wilderness)
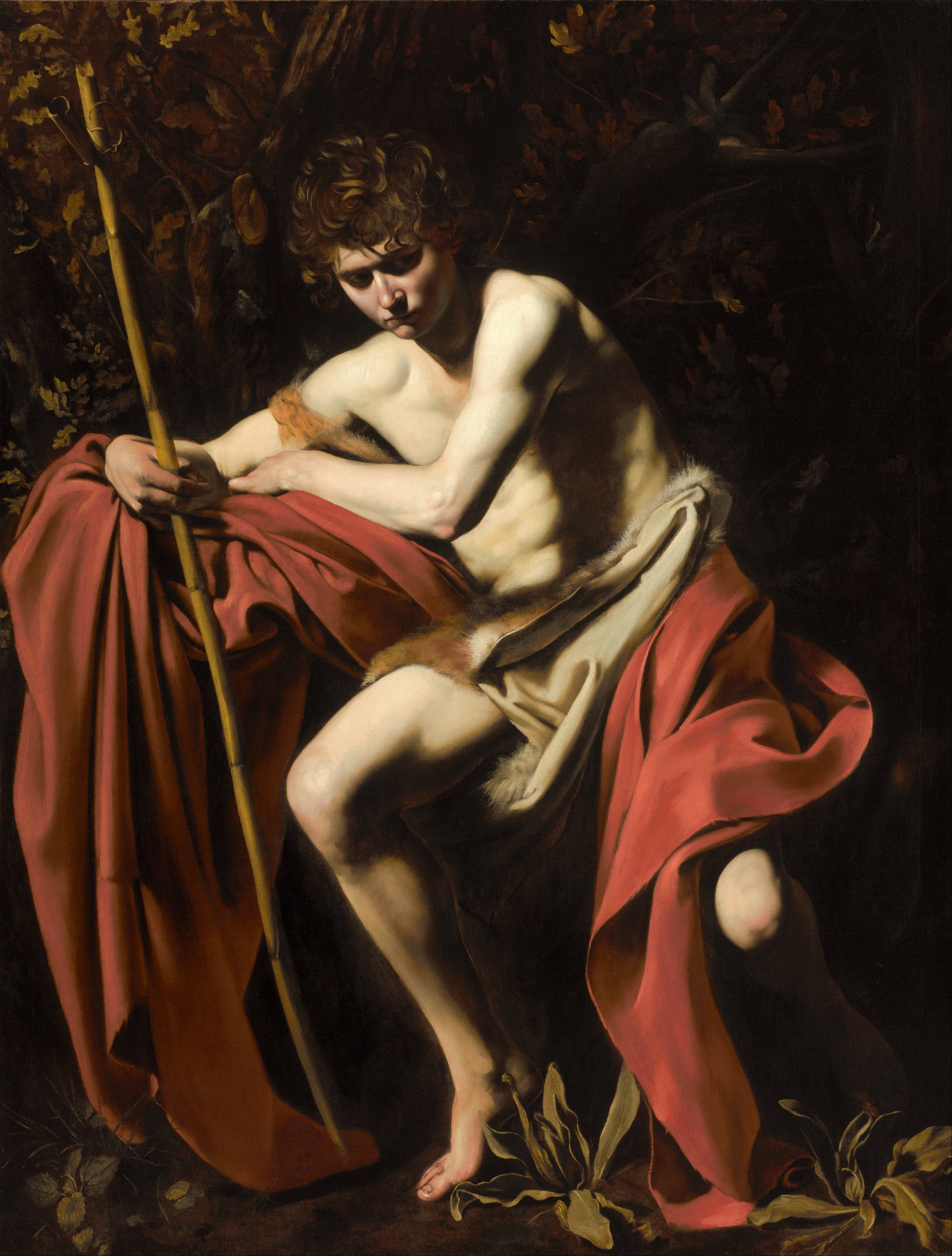
- Artist: Caravaggio
- Year: c. 1604
- Medium: Oil on canvas
- Dimensions: 173 cm × 133 cm (68 in × 52 in)
- Location: Nelson-Atkins Museum of Art, Kansas City

Bellini's Baptist is depicted within a conventional framework that his audience would know and share; Caravaggio's is almost impenetrably private. In 1604 Caravaggio was commissioned to paint a John the Baptist for the papal banker and art patron Ottavio Costa, who already owned the artist's Judith Beheading Holofernes and Martha and Mary Magdalene. Costa intended it for an altarpiece for a small oratory in the Costa fiefdom of Conscente (a village near Albenga, on the Italian Riviera), but liked it so much that he sent a copy to the oratory and kept the original in his own collection. It is now held in the Nelson-Atkins Museum of Art in Kansas City.

Stark contrasts of light and dark accentuate the perception that the figure leans forward, out of the deep shadows of the background and into the lighter realm of the viewer's own space...The brooding melancholy of the Nelson-Atkins Baptist has attracted the attention of almost every commentator. It seems, indeed, as if Caravaggio instilled in this image an element of the essential pessimism of the Baptist's preaching, of the senseless tragedy of his early martyrdom, and perhaps even some measure of the artist's own troubled psyche. The saint's gravity is at least partly explained, too, by the painting's function as the focal point of the meeting place of a confraternity whose mission was to care for the sick and dying and to bury the corpses of plague victims.

Caravaggio biographer Peter Robb has pointed out that the fourth Baptist seems like a psychic mirror-image of the first, with all the signs reversed: the brilliant morning light which bathed the earlier painting has become harsh and almost lunar in its contrasts, and the vivid green foliage has turned to dry dead brown. There is almost nothing in the way of symbols to identify that this is indeed a religious image, no halo, no sheep, no leather girdle, nothing but the thin reed cross (a reference to Christ's description of John as "a reed shaken by the wind"). The painting demonstrates what Robb calls Caravaggio's "feeling for the drama of the human presence." This adolescent, almost adult, John seems locked in some private world known only to his creator. Caravaggio's conception of the saint as a seated, solitary figure, lacking almost any narrative identity (how do we know this is the Baptist? What is happening here?) was truly revolutionary. Artists from Giotto to Bellini and beyond had shown the Baptist as an approachable story, a symbol understandable to all; the very idea that a work should express a private world, rather than a common religious and social experience, was radically new.

== John the Baptist, Galleria Nazionale d'Arte Antica, Rome ==
John the Baptist (John in the Wilderness)
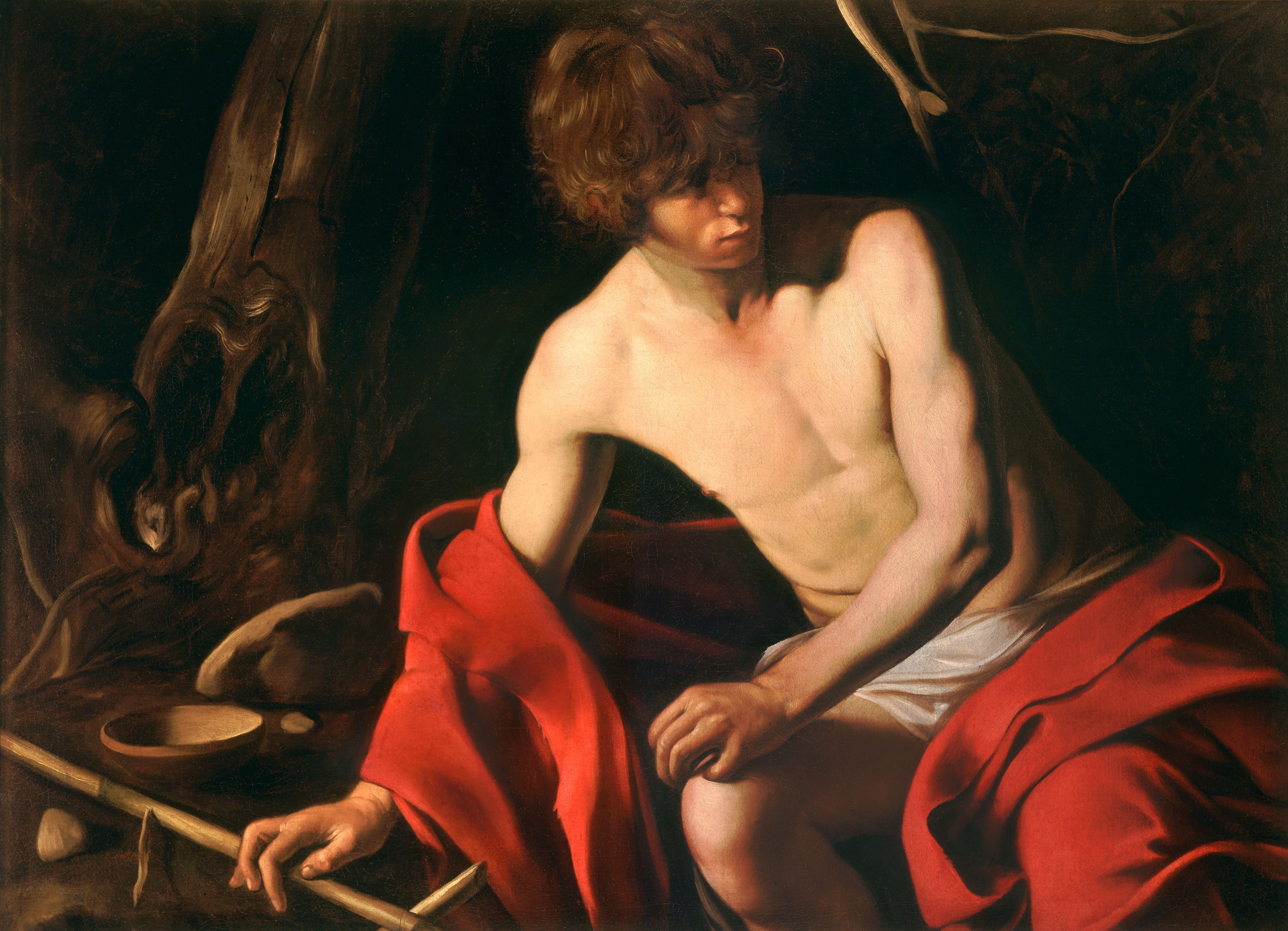
- Artist: Caravaggio
- Year: c. 1604
- Medium: Oil on canvas
- Dimensions: 94 cm × 131 cm (37 in × 52 in)
- Location: Galleria Nazionale d'Arte Antica, Rome

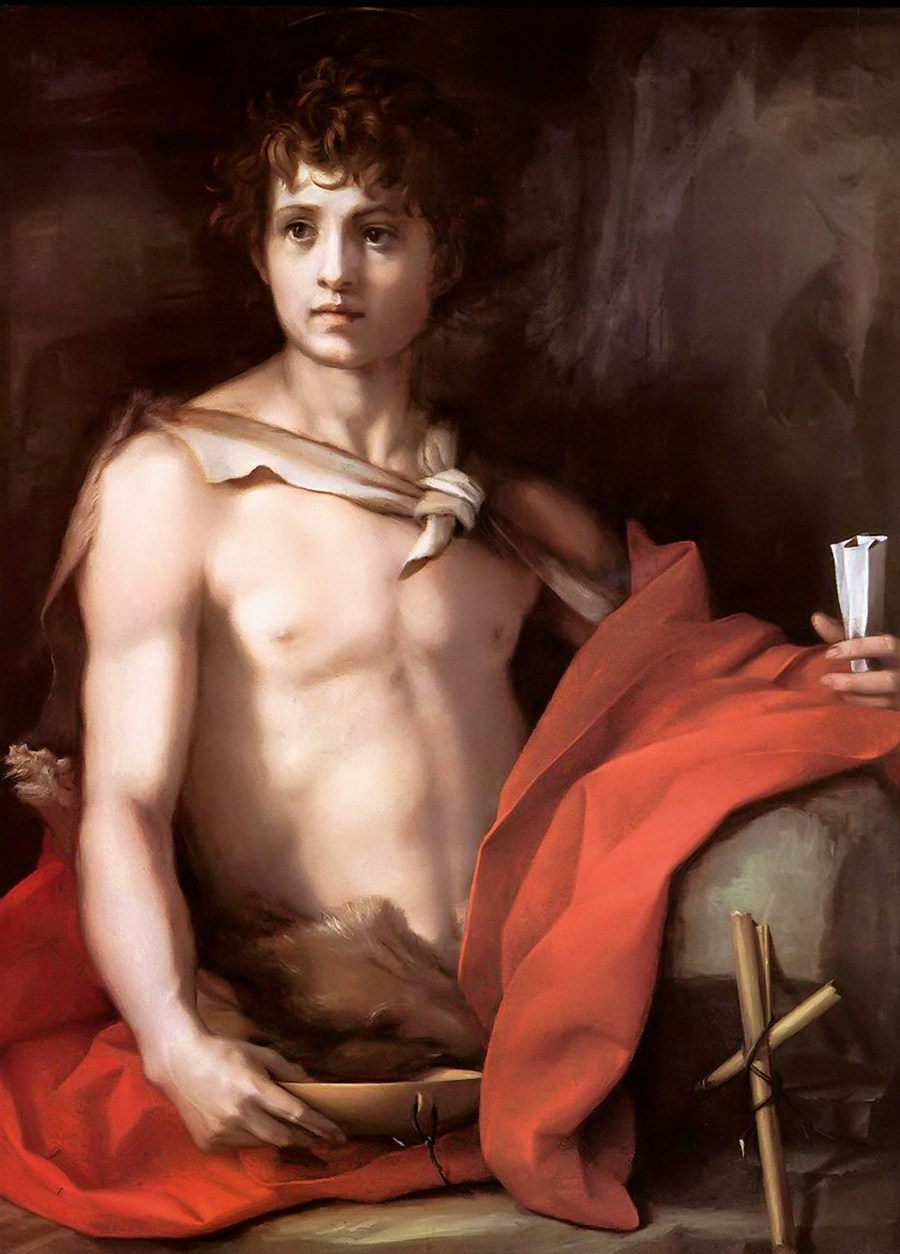
John the Baptist, Andrea del Sarto, 1528. Pitti Palace, Florence – a precedent for Caravaggio's treatment of the theme, with a similar use of background and symbols.

This is one of two John the Baptists painted by Caravaggio in or around 1604 (possibly 1605). It is held in the Palazzo Corsini collection of the Galleria Nazionale d'Arte Antica. Like the John done for Ottavio Costa, the figure has been stripped of identifying symbols - no belt, not even the "raiment of camel's hair", and the reed cross is only suggested. The background and surrounds have darkened even further, and again there is the sense of a story from which the viewer is excluded.

Caravaggio was not the first artist to have treated the Baptist as a cryptic male nude - there were prior examples from Leonardo, Raphael, Andrea del Sarto and others – but he introduced a new note of realism and drama. His John has the roughened, sunburnt hands and neck of a labourer, his pale torso emerging with a contrast that reminds the viewer that this is a real boy who has gotten undressed for his modelling session – unlike Raphael's Baptist, who is as idealised and un-individualised as one of his winged cherubs.

Ask who this model actually is (or was), and the realism of the individual spills over as a record of Rome itself in the age of Caravaggio. Biographer Peter Robb cites Montaigne on Rome as a city of universal idleness, "...the envied idleness of the higher clerics, and the frightening idleness of the destitute...a city almost without trades or professions, in which the churchmen were playboys or bureaucrats, the laymen were condemned to be courtiers, all the pretty girls and boys seemed to be prostitutes, and all wealth was inherited old money or extorted new." It was not an age which welcomed an art that emphasised the real.

== John the Baptist (St John the Baptist at the Fountain), MUZA, Valletta ==
John the Baptist (John the Baptist at the Fountain)
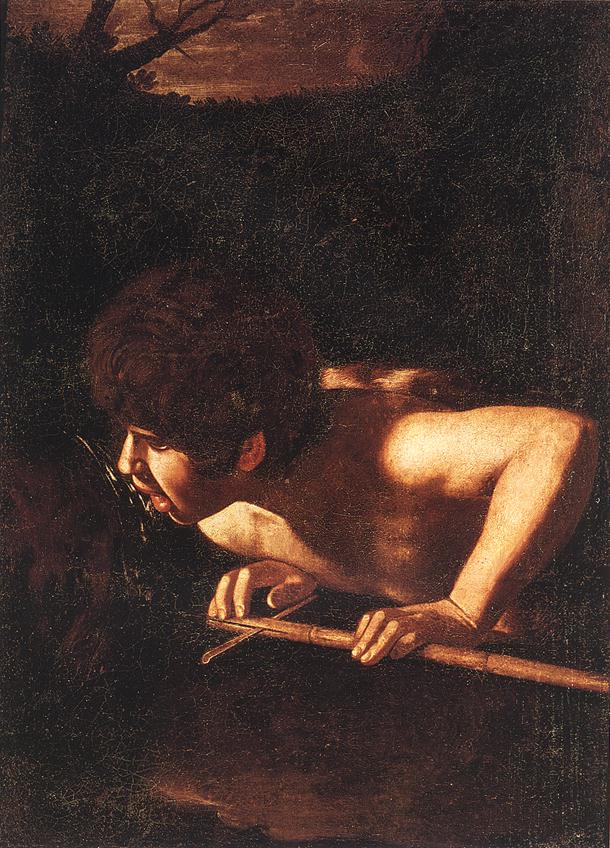
- Artist: Caravaggio (disputed)
- Year: c. 1608
- Medium: Oil on canvas
- Dimensions: 100 cm × 73 cm (39 in × 29 in)
- Location: MUŻA, Valletta

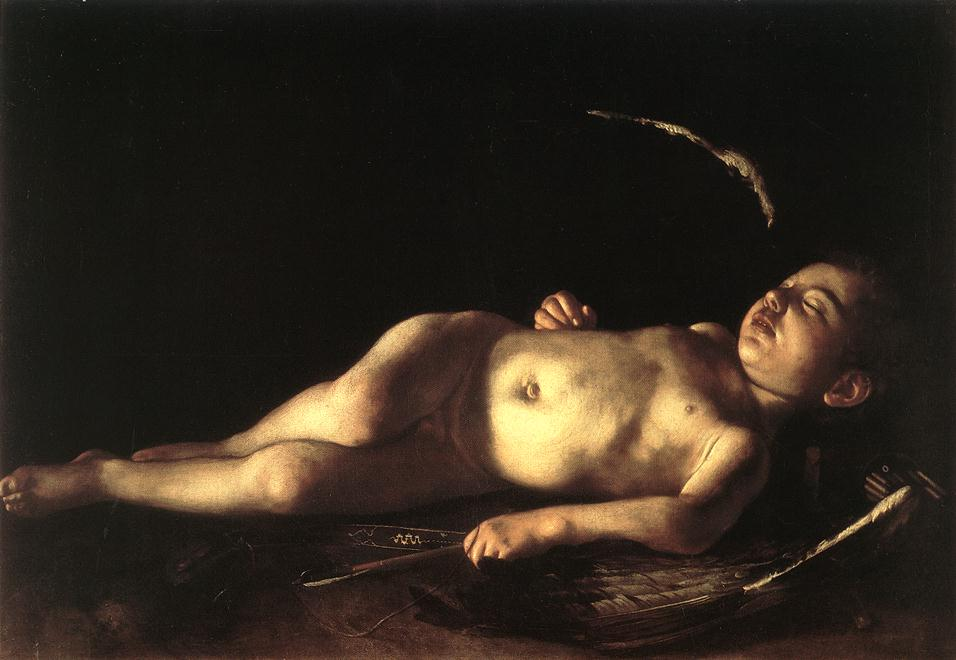
Sleeping Cupid, Caravaggio, 1608. Pitti Palace, Florence – stylistic similarities with the attested Cupid lend support to the disputed John the Baptist at the Fountain.

St John the Baptist at the Fountain, kept in a private collection in Malta, had been difficult to study. Since 2022 it is in the MUŻA in Valletta, Malta. John Gash treats it as by Caravaggio, pointing out the similarity in the treatment of the flesh to the Sleeping Cupid, recognised as by the artist and dating from his Malta period. The painting has been badly damaged, especially in the landscape. The work is known in two other variants, each slightly different.

The theme of the young John drinking from a spring reflects the Gospel tradition that the Baptist drank only water during his period in the wilderness. The painting displays typically Caravaggist extreme chiaroscuro (use of light and shadow), and is also typical in taking a young John the Baptist as its subject, this time set in a dark landscape against an ominous patch of lighter sky. "The mechanics of drinking and the psychology of thirst are beautifully conveyed through the artful manipulation of limbs and the carefully constructed head".

If it is in fact by the artist, it would have been painted during his approximately 15 months in Malta in 1607–1608. His recognised works from this period include such masterpieces as the Portrait of Alof de Wignacourt and his Page and The Beheading of Saint John the Baptist. The latter, in the oratory of St John's Co-Cathedral, is the only work that the artist signed.

In Malta Caravaggio was accepted into the Order of Saint John (the Knights of Malta) and became in effect their official artist, but his stay ended with a mysterious offense and his expulsion from the Order "as a foul and rotten limb". The crime on Malta has been the subject of much speculation, but seems to have been extremely serious, possibly even involving the death penalty. Most modern writers believe that it was a crime of violence. His earliest biographer, Giovanni Baglione, said that there had been a "disagreement" with a knight of justice (i.e., a knight drawn from the European nobility); Giovan Pietro Bellori, who visited Malta to see the Beheading of John the Baptist some fifty years after the event, wrote that Caravaggio "had come into conflict with a very noble knight", as a result of which he had incurred the displeasure of the Grand Master and had to flee. It is possible that the offence involved a duel, which was regarded very seriously – but the penalty for duelling was imprisonment, not death. The death penalty was imposed for murder – and a death in a duel or brawl equated to murder – but the wording used by both Baglione and Bellori implied that the knight Caravaggio offended had survived. Peter Robb, in his popular biography M, (1998), makes the case for a sexual misdemeanour, but his argument is speculative.

== John the Baptist, Galleria Borghese, Rome ==
John the Baptist (John in the Wilderness)
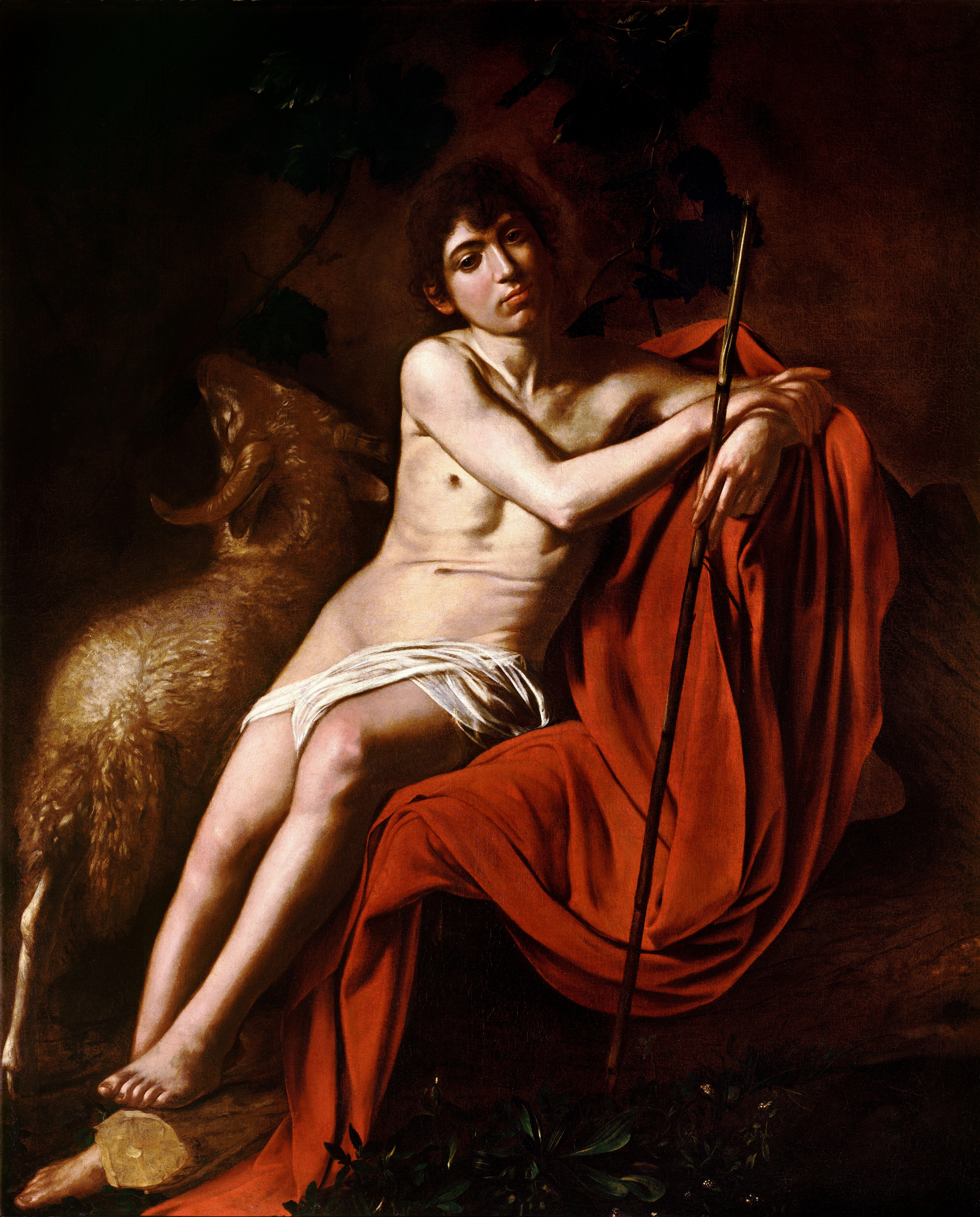
- Artist: Caravaggio
- Year: c. 1610
- Medium: Oil on canvas
- Dimensions: 159 cm × 124 cm (63 in × 49 in)
- Location: Galleria Borghese, Rome

The date of the John the Baptist in the Galleria Borghese is disputed: it was long thought to have been acquired by Cardinal Scipione Borghese some time between his own arrival in Rome in 1605 and Caravaggio's flight from the city in 1606, but Roberto Longhi dated it to the artist's Sicilian period (a date post-1608) on the basis of similarities in handling and colour. Lonhi's view has gained increasing acceptance, with a consensus in favour of 1610 emerging in recent years.

The painting shows a boy slumped against a dark background, where a sheep nibbles at a dull brown vine. The boy is immersed in a reverie: perhaps as Saint John he is lost in private melancholy, contemplating the coming sacrifice of Christ; or perhaps as a real-life street-kid called on to model for hours he is merely bored. As so often with Caravaggio, the sense is of both at once. But the overwhelming feeling is of sorrow. The red cloak envelopes his puny childish body like a flame in the dark, the sole touch of colour apart from the pale flesh of the juvenile saint. "Compared with the earlier Capitolina and Kansas City versions...the Borghese picture is more richly colouristic - an expressive essay in reds, whites, and golden browns. It also represents a less idealised and more sensuous approach to the male nude, as prefigured in the stout-limbed figures of certain of Caravaggio's post-Roman works, such as the Naples Flagellation and the Valletta Beheading of John the Baptist".

Borghese was a discriminating collector but notorious for extorting and even stealing pieces that caught his eye – he, or rather his uncle Pope Paul V, had recently imprisoned Giuseppe Cesari, one of the best-known and most successful painters in Rome, on trumped-up charges in order to confiscate his collection of a hundred and six paintings, which included three of the Caravaggios today displayed in the Galleria Borghese (Boy Peeling Fruit, Young Sick Bacchus, and Boy with a basket of Fruit). They joined the Caravaggios that the Cardinal already possessed, including a Saint Jerome and the Madonna and Child with St. Anne (the Grooms' Madonna).

By 1610 Caravaggio's life was unravelling. It's always dangerous to interpret an artist's works in terms of his life, but in this case the temptation is overwhelming, and every writer on Caravaggio seems to surrender to it. In 1606 he had fled Rome as an outlaw after killing a man in a street fight; in 1608 he had been thrown into prison in Malta and again escaped; through 1609 he had been pursued across Sicily by his enemies until taking refuge in Naples, where he had been attacked in the street by unknown assailants within days of his arrival. Now he was under the protection of the Colonna family in the city, seeking a pardon that would allow him to return to Rome. The power to grant the pardon lay in the hands of the art-loving Cardinal Borghese, who would expect to be paid in paintings. News that the pardon was imminent arrived in mid-year, and the artist set out by boat with three canvasses. The next news was that he had died "of a fever" in Porto Ercole, a coastal town north of Rome held by Spain.

== John the Baptist (St John the Baptist Reclining), Munich ==
John the Baptist (Reclining Baptist)
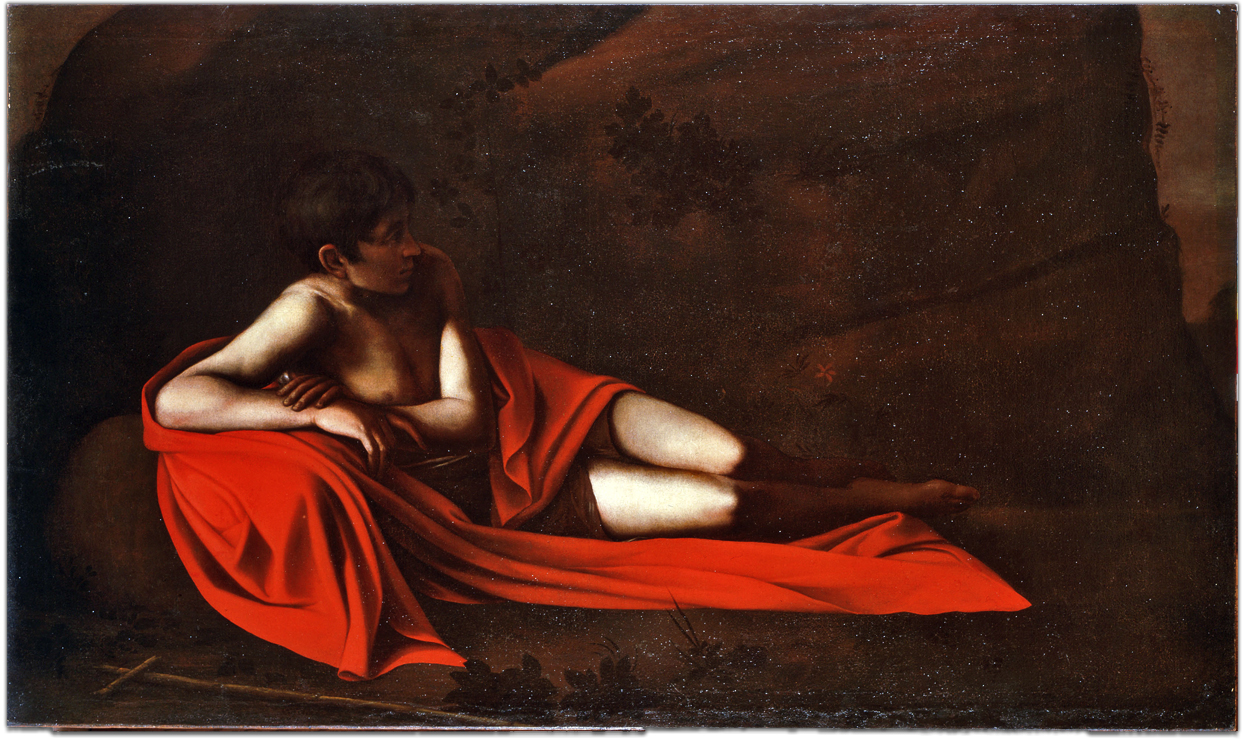
- Artist: Caravaggio
- Year: 1610
- Medium: Oil on canvas
- Dimensions: 106 cm × 179.5 cm (42 in × 70.7 in)
- Location: Private collection

This Reclining John the Baptist, is an oil painting by Caravaggio, painted in 1610 and is now kept in a private collection in Munich. This painting is one of the seven versions the Lombard painter dedicated to the theme of "Saint John", that John the Baptist as a child or as a teenager portrait.

The canvas is identifiable with the painting that was at Palazzo Cellammare, Naples, owned by Costanza Colonna, Marchioness of Caravaggio, along with a work of the same subject (the St John the Baptist of the Borghese collection) and a Magdalene, as evidenced by the letter the Apostolic Nuncio in the Kingdom of Naples, Diodato Gentile to Cardinal Scipione Caffarelli-Borghese in Rome, on July 29, 1610. The three paintings were commissioned by the Borghese and were on the felucca that was supposed to bring their author from Naples to Rome, just before he died. Also from the letter of 29 July that, when Caravaggio was imprisoned in Palo, the paintings were shown to Naples to Costanza Colonna. Scipione Borghese was able to regain possession of one of the two St. John (the one currently on display at the Galleria Borghese), while the St. John Reclining was seized, almost certainly by Pedro Fernández de Castro, Count of Lemos the viceroy of Naples from 1610 to 1616. Thee painting arrived in Spain in 1616, when the Count of Lemos, his term as viceroy having expired, left for Madrid. The painting then passed down through the family to Pedro Antonio Fernández de Castro, 10th Count of Lemos, who was appointed viceroy of Peru in 1667 and was certainly responsible for the transfer of St. John reclining to Latin America. After being in a private collection in El Salvador and then to Buenos Aires, the painting was brought to Bavaria by an Argentine lady, just before the Second World War. The canvas was announced by Marini as autograph after the restoration carried out in Rome by Pico Cellini in 1977-78 and dated 1610. The chronological position in the very last phase of life of the painter was confirmed not only by zeros, in written communications from Stroughton (1987), Pico Cellini (1987), Pepper (1987), Spike ( 1988), Slatkes (1992) and Claudio Strinati (1997), but it should be noted also that Bologna considered the work a copy of a lost original by the Neapolitan church of Sant'Anna dei Lombardi. The hypothesis of the scholar (who later changed his mind in 1992 where he explicitly identified the painting of Monaco in San Giovanni that Caravaggio was carrying on the felucca) is still unfounded, not knowing the original prototype of the Chapel Fenaroli, destroyed in ' old fire of the church, which were destroyed in the other two paintings by Caravaggio: The resurrection of Christ and St. Francis in the act of receiving the stigmata. This painting can not be confused with any other of St. John of Caravaggio, which have an origin and a documented provenance; therefore its connection with the mentioned in the letters of Diodato Gentile to Scipione Borghese is certainly to be welcomed. In the languid pose of St. John are discernible Venetian memories: the reference is specifically to the Venuses and Danae of Giorgione and Titian, but also to the ancient representations of river gods and paintings of the same subject in the Neapolitan area. Pacelli has pointed out the similarities with the Borghese St John, the Adoration of Messina, the Martyrdom of Saint Ursula of Intesa Sanpaolo collection in Naples. A St John the Baptist reclining has a recent exhibition at the Rembrandt House Museum devoted to it between 2010 and 2011: to report in this regard, the publication on the exhibition, interventions Strinati (2010-2011), Treffers (2010–2011), Pacelli (2010-2011), which traces back the history and critical analysis of the painting on the basis of the findings in 1994, which highlight aspects of painting technique and restoration.

== John the Baptist feeding the Lamb (Private collection, Rome) ==
End of the first decade of the 17th Century, oil on canvas, 78x122 cm.

== See also ==
- The Beheading of Saint John the Baptist (Caravaggio)
- List of paintings by Caravaggio
