= Amor Vincit Omnia (Caravaggio) =

Painting by Caravaggio

- Amor vincitore (Italian)
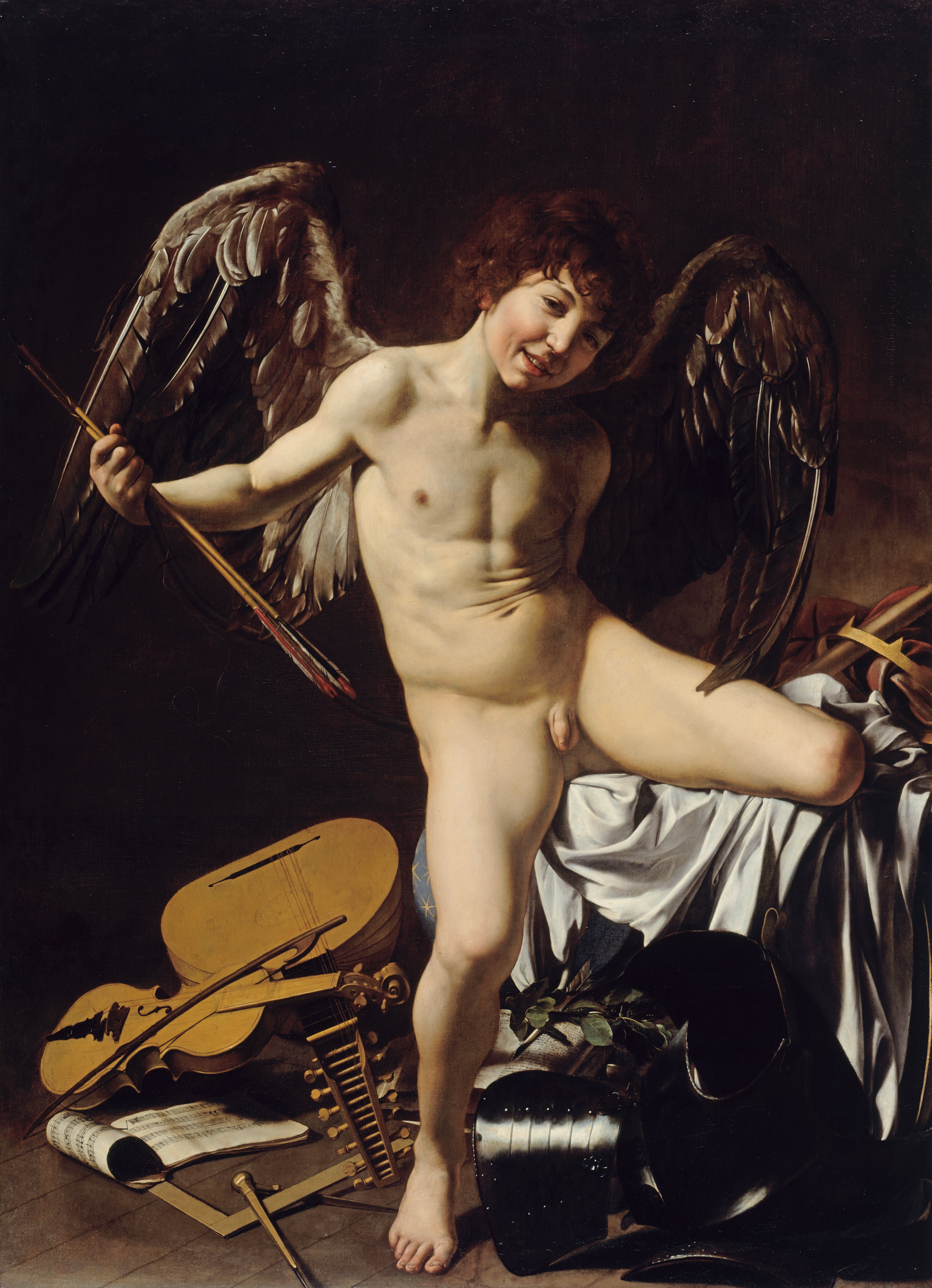
- Artist: Caravaggio
- Year: 1601–1602
- Medium: Oil on canvas
- Dimensions: 156 cm × 113 cm (61 in × 44 in)
- Location: Gemäldegalerie; Berlin

Amor Vincit Omnia in Latin, known in English by a variety of names including Amor Victorious, Victorious Cupid, Love Triumphant, Love Victorious or Earthly Love, is a painting by the Italian Baroque artist Caravaggio, from 1601-1602.

== Description ==
Amor Vincit Omnia shows Amor, the Roman Cupid, wearing dark eagle wings, half-sitting on or climbing down from what appears to be a table. Scattered around are the emblems of all human endeavors—violin and lute, armor, coronet, square and compasses, pen and manuscript, bay leaves, and flower, tangled and trampled under Cupid's foot. The painting illustrates the line from Virgil's Eclogues, Omnia Vincit Amor et nos cedamus amori. A musical manuscript on the floor shows a large "V". It has therefore been suggested also that the picture is a reference to the achievements of Marchese Vincenzo Giustiniani. Giustiniani is said to have prized it above all other works in his collection.

== Background ==
The subject of Cupid was common for the age. Caravaggio's depiction of Cupid is unusually realistic—where other depictions, such as the contemporary Sleeping Cupid by Battistello Caracciolo, show an idealized, almost generic version. The dramatic chiaroscuro lighting and the photographic clarity, is the mingling of the allegorical and the real. Despite the clear indications of Caravaggio's practice of painting direct from a live model, there is an undeniable resemblance to the pose of Michelangelo's Victory now in the Palazzo Vecchio, Florence.

The painter Orazio Gentileschi lent Caravaggio the wings as props to be used in the painting, and this allows fairly precise dating of 1602–03. It was an immediate success in the circles of Rome's intellectual and cultural elite. A poet immediately wrote three madrigals about it, and another wrote a Latin epigram in which it was first coupled with the Virgilian phrase Omnia Vincit Amor, although this did not become its title until the critic Giovanni Pietro Bellori wrote his life of Caravaggio in 1672.

Additionally, many scholarly and non-scholarly authors have written on the alleged eroticism of the painting.

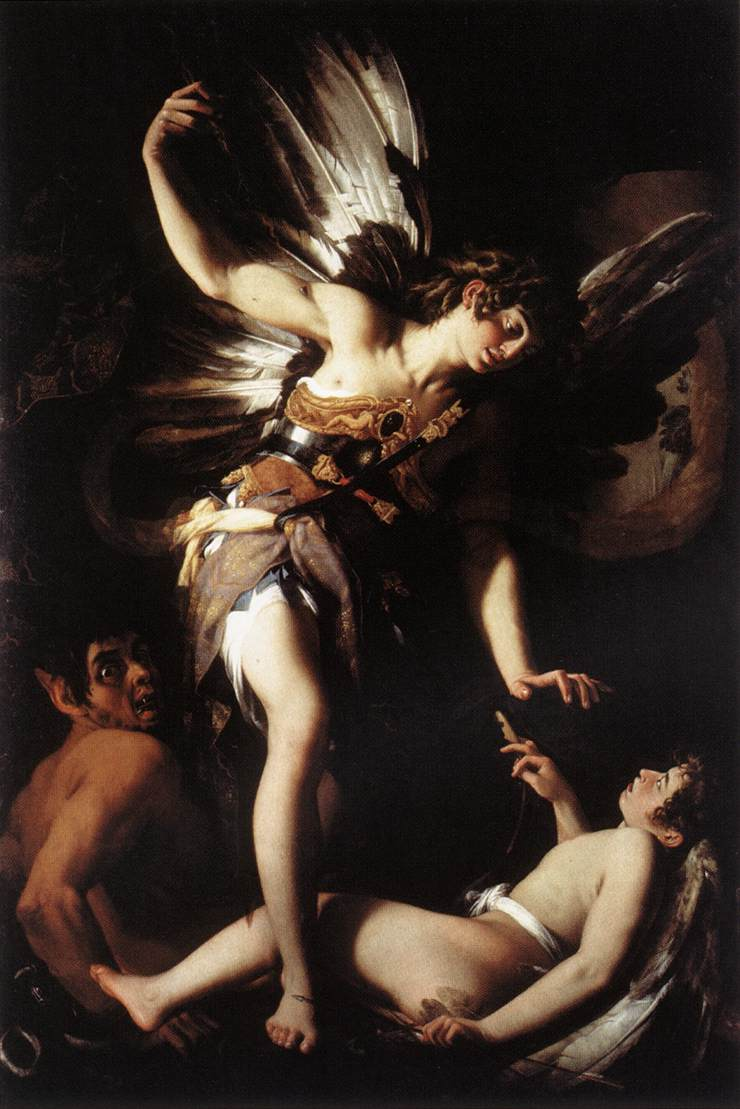
Giovanni Baglione. Divine Love Conquering Earthly Love. 1602–1603 Oil on canvas. 179 x 118 cm. Galleria Nazionale d'Arte Antica, Rome.

In 1602, shortly after Amor Vincit was completed, Cardinal Benedetto Giustiniani, Vincenzo's brother and collaborator in the creation of the Giustiniani collection of contemporary art, commissioned a painting from the noted artist Giovanni Baglione. Baglione's Divine Love Conquering Earthly Love showed Divine Love separating a juvenile Cupid on the ground in the lower right corner (profane love) from a Lucifer in the left corner. Its style was thoroughly derivative of Caravaggio (who had recently emerged as a rival for Church commissions) and a clear challenge to the recent Amor, and the younger painter bitterly protested at what he saw as plagiarism. Taunted by one of Caravaggio's friends, Baglione responded with a second version, in which the devil was given Caravaggio's face. Thus began a long and vicious quarrel which was to have unforeseeable ramifications for Caravaggio decades after his death when the unforgiving Baglione became his first biographer.

Sandrart described Amor as "A life-size Cupid after a boy of about twelve...[who] has large brown eagle's wings, drawn so correctly and with such strong coloring, clarity and relief that it all comes to life." Richard Symonds, an English visitor to Rome about 1649/51, recorded the Cupid as being "ye body and face of his (Caravaggio's) own boy or servant that (sic) laid with him". The Italian art historian Giani Pappi has put forward the theory that this Cecco may be identical with Cecco del Caravaggio, a notable Italian follower of Caravaggio who emerged in the decade after the master's death. While this remains controversial, there is more widespread support for Pappi's further proposal that Cecco del Caravaggio should be identified as an artist known as Francesco Boneri. Cecco Boneri, if this is his name, appears in many of Caravaggio's paintings, as the juvenile angel supporting Christ in The Conversion of Saint Paul (1600–1601), possibly as the angel offering a martyr's palm to the saint in The Martyrdom of Saint Matthew (1599–1600) (although seen only as of the top of a curly head of hair), as the young Isaac about to have his throat cut in The Sacrifice of Isaac (1603), as an adolescent David in David with the Head of Goliath (Caravaggio, Rome) (c. 1610—the head is Caravaggio's), and as the John the Baptist now in the Capitoline Gallery in Rome.

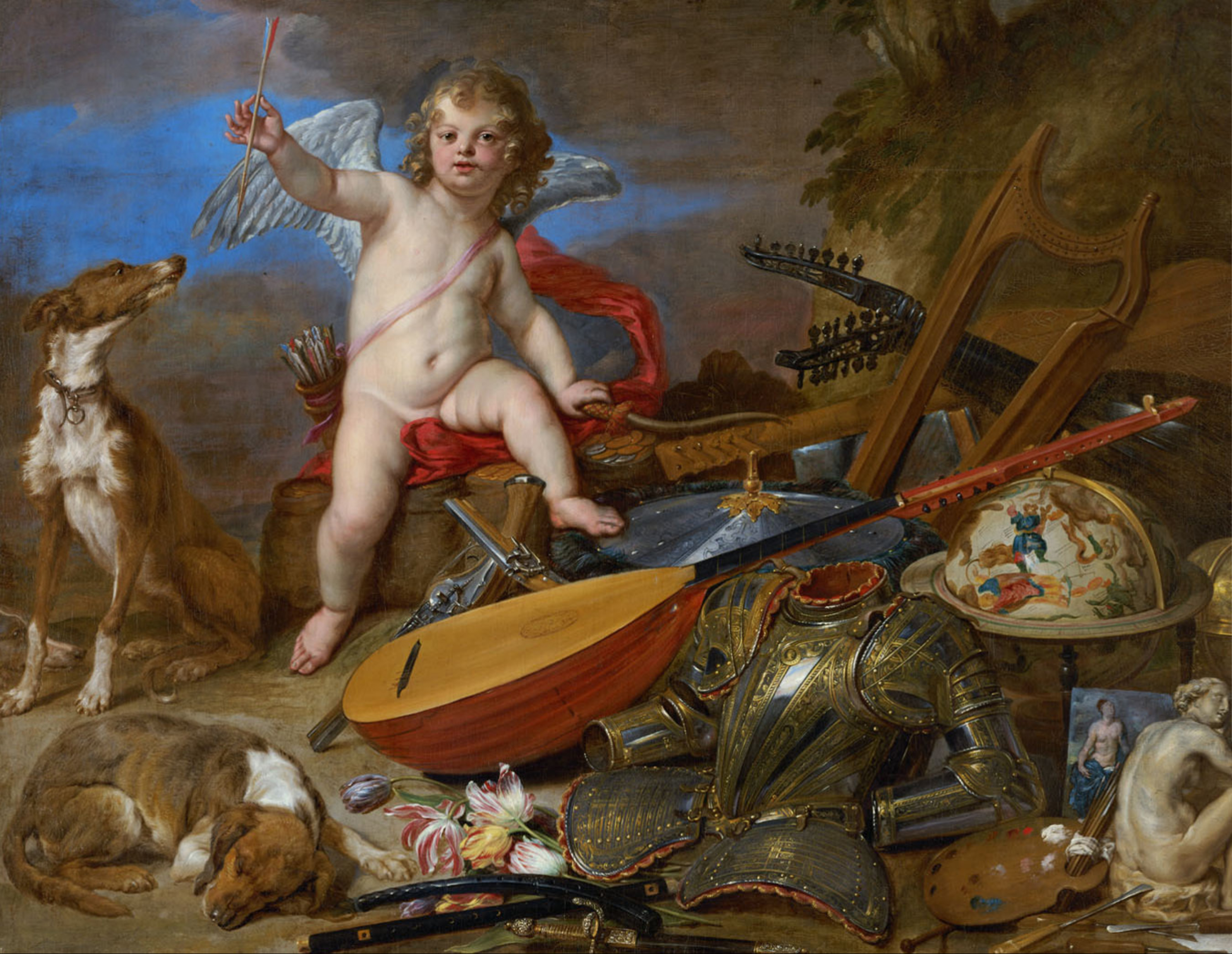
The same subject by Jan van den Hoecke and Paul de Vos, 1640s

The picture remained in the Giustiniani collection until 1812, when it was purchased by the art dealer Féréol Bonnemaison, and sold to Frederick William III of Prussia in 1815 for the Berlin Museums. It remains part of the collection of the Berlin State Museums today, and is displayed in the Gemäldegalerie.

== See also ==
- Master of the Gamblers, for a similar painting entitled Omnia Vincit Amor ("Victorious Cupid")
- List of paintings by Caravaggio
