= Sleeping Cupid =

Sleeping Cupid:

- Sleeping Cupid, a painting by Caravaggio.
- Sleeping Cupid, a sculpture by Michelangelo.
