= Sacrifice of Isaac (Caravaggio) =

Paintings by Caravaggio

Sacrifice of Isaac Uffizi version
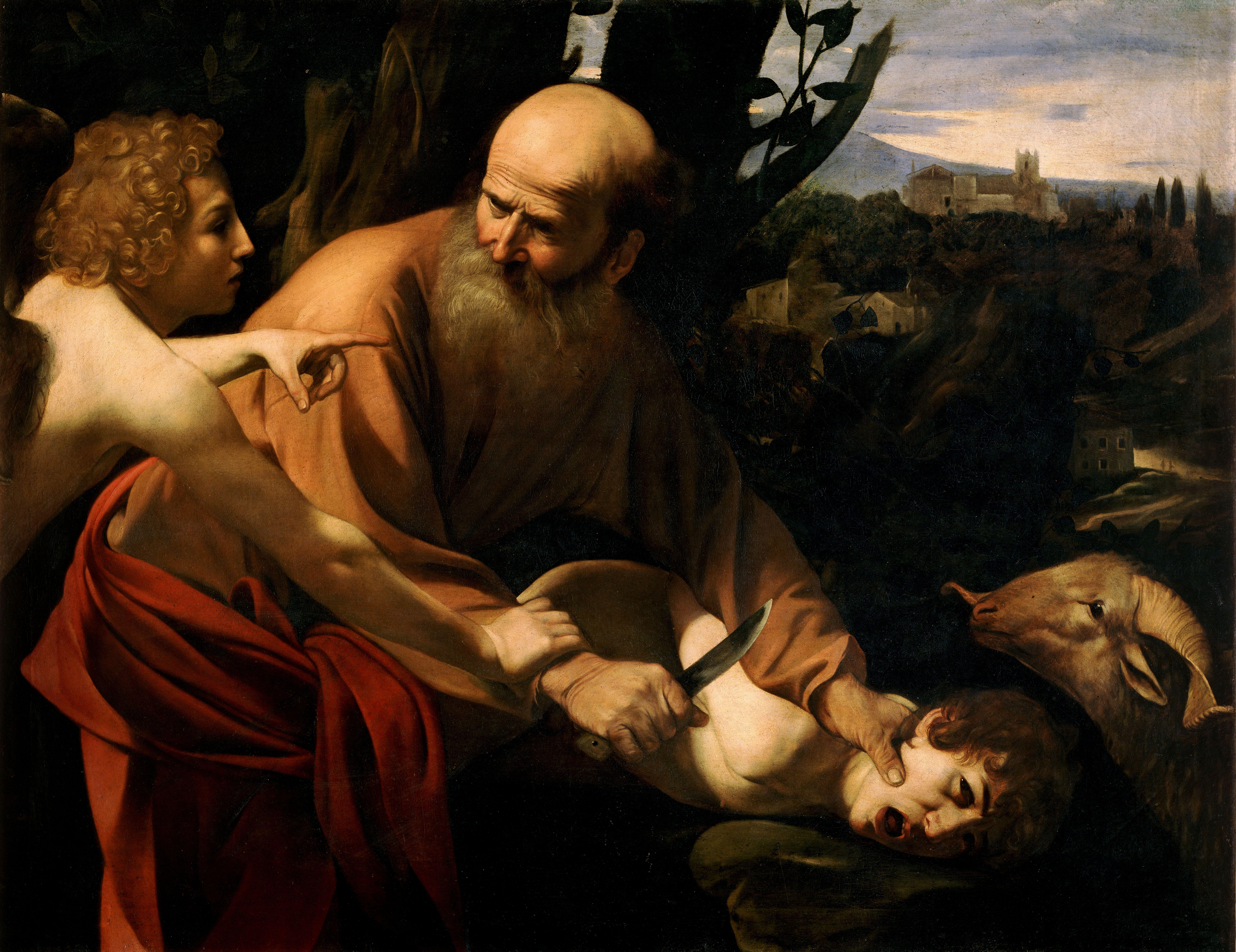
- Year: 1603
- Medium: Oil on canvas
- Dimensions: 104 cm × 135 cm (41 in × 53 in)
- Location: Uffizi, Florence

The Sacrifice of Isaac is the title of two paintings from c. 1598–1603 depicting the sacrifice of Isaac. The paintings could be painted by the Italian master Caravaggio (1571–1610) but there is also strong evidence that they may have been the work of Bartolomeo Cavarozzi, a talented early member of the Caravaggio following who is known to have been in Spain about 1617–1619.

== Princeton version ==
Abraham and the sacrifice of his son Isaac
- Sacrificio d'Isacco (Italian)
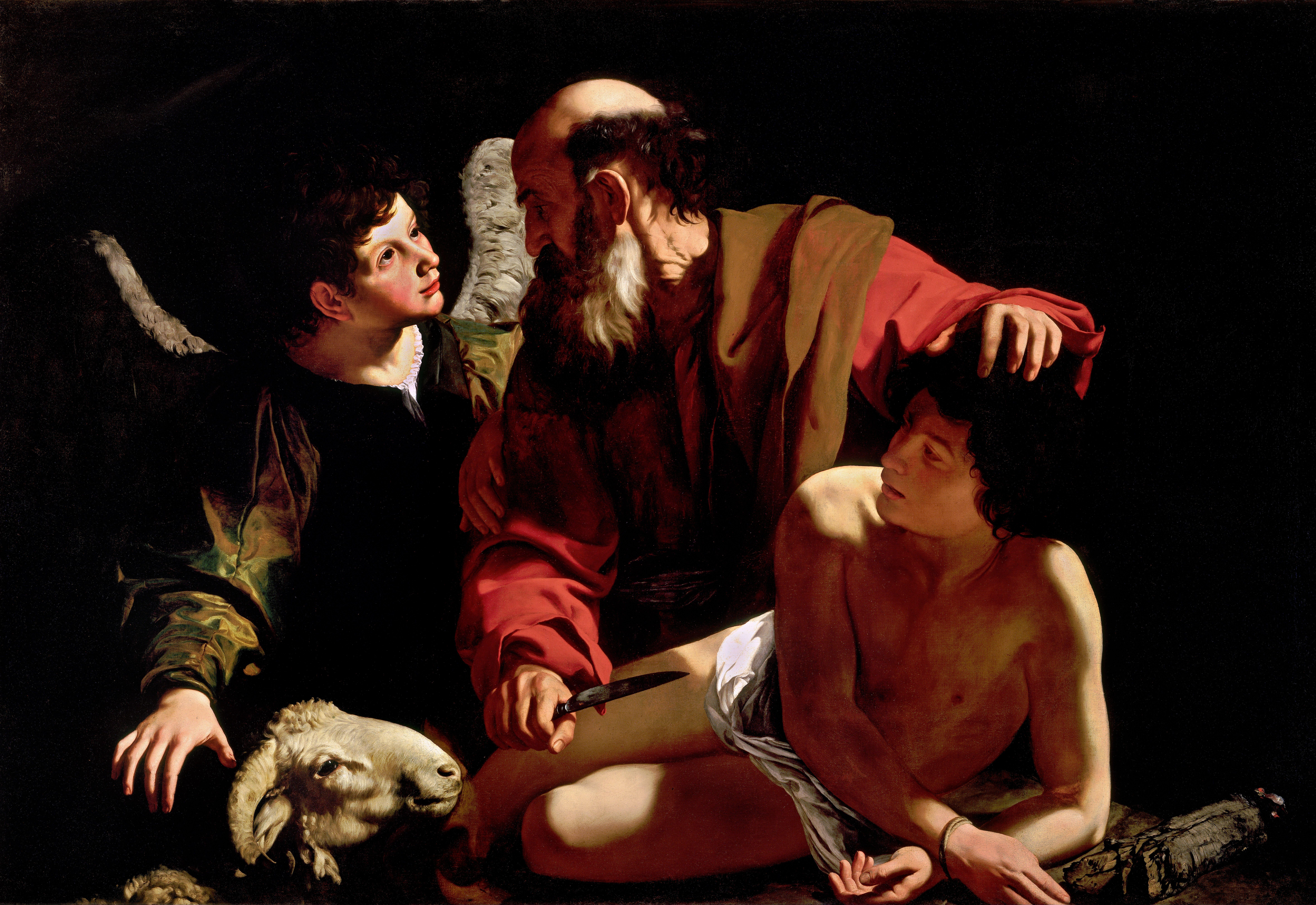
- Year: c. 1598
- Medium: Oil on canvas
- Dimensions: 116 cm × 173 cm (46 in × 68 in)
- Location: ex Piasecka-Johnson Collection, Princeton

The Sacrifice of Isaac (ex Piasecka-Johnson Collection in Princeton, New Jersey) is a disputed work that was painted circa 1603. According to Giulio Mancini, a contemporary of Caravaggio and an early biographer, the artist, while convalescing in the Hospital of the Consolazione, did a number of paintings which the prior took home with him to Seville. (The hospital had a Spanish prior from 1593 to around mid-1595.) That would date the work to the mid-1590s, but it seems far more sophisticated than anything else known from that period of Caravaggio's career, and Peter Robb, in his 1998 biography of Caravaggio, dates it to about 1598.

The model for Isaac bears a close resemblance to the model used for the John the Baptist now in the museum of Toledo Cathedral, which suggests that the two should be considered together. The presence of paintings by Caravaggio in Spain at an early date is important for the influence they may have had on the young Velázquez, but there is also strong evidence that they may have been the work of Bartolomeo Cavarozzi, a talented early member of the Caravaggio following who is known to have been in Spain about 1617–1619.

The painting depicts the moment when Abraham, in obedience to God's command, is about to sacrifice his son Isaac, who is saved by an angel offering Abraham a ram in Isaac's place. The scene is lit with the dramatically enhanced chiaroscuro (tenebrism) with which Caravaggio was to revolutionize Western art, falling like a stage spotlight on the face of the youthful angel. The faces of Abraham and Isaac are in shadow, but show great emotion. The gestures of the hands are acutely eloquent, and the angel's hand is resting on the ram's head in imitation of the way Abraham's left hand rests on the head of his son. The Patriarch's other hand is holding the knife, but he is already relaxing as he listens to the angel. The three figures and the ram are shown without background or context, with nothing to distract from the powerful psychological drama as God's promise is delivered.

The painting was sold at Sotheby’s London on 9 July 2014 (lot 30) as a work by Bartolomeo Cavarozzi and is now owned by a private collection.

== Uffizi version ==
Another example of Sacrifice of Isaac is housed in the Uffizi Gallery, Florence. According to the early biographer Giovanni Pietro Bellori, Caravaggio painted a version of this subject for Cardinal Maffeo Barberini, the future Pope Urban VIII, and a series of payments totalling one hundred scudi were made to the artist by Barberini between May 1603 and January 1604. Caravaggio had previously painted a Portrait of Maffeo Barberini, which presumably pleased the Cardinal enough for him to commission this second painting.

Isaac has been identified as Cecco Boneri, who appeared as Caravaggio's model in several other pictures. Recent X-ray analysis showed that Caravaggio used Cecco also for the angel, and later modified the profile and the hair to hide the resemblance.

== Symbolism and iconography ==
The symbol of the ram has many facets of meaning. In the Biblical era, the ram's horn was a symbol of power. Referred to as a shofar, the ram's horn was used in battle to alert warriors. In Christianity, the ram itself represents Jesus Christ as the lamb of God, or sometimes referred to as "the ultimate sacrifice", foreshadowing Jesus' crucifixion.

== See also ==
- List of paintings by Caravaggio

== Bibliography ==
- Gash, John (2003). Caravaggio. ISBN 1-904449-22-0.
- Prose, Francine (2005). Caravaggio : Painter of Miracles. ISBN 0-06-057560-3.
- Robb, Peter (1998). M. ISBN 0-312-27474-2.
- Spike, John T. (2001). Caravaggio. ISBN 0-7892-0639-0.
- Dreyfus, Gustav; Rimer, Yehudit (1995). Abraham, the man and the symbol : a Jungian interpretation of the biblical story. Wilmette, Ill. : Chiron Publications. pp. 31. ISBN 0933029942.
