= Portrait of Fra Antonio Martelli (Caravaggio) =

Painting by Caravaggio

Portrait of Antonio Martelli, Knight of Malta
- Ritratto di un cavaliere di Malta (Italian)
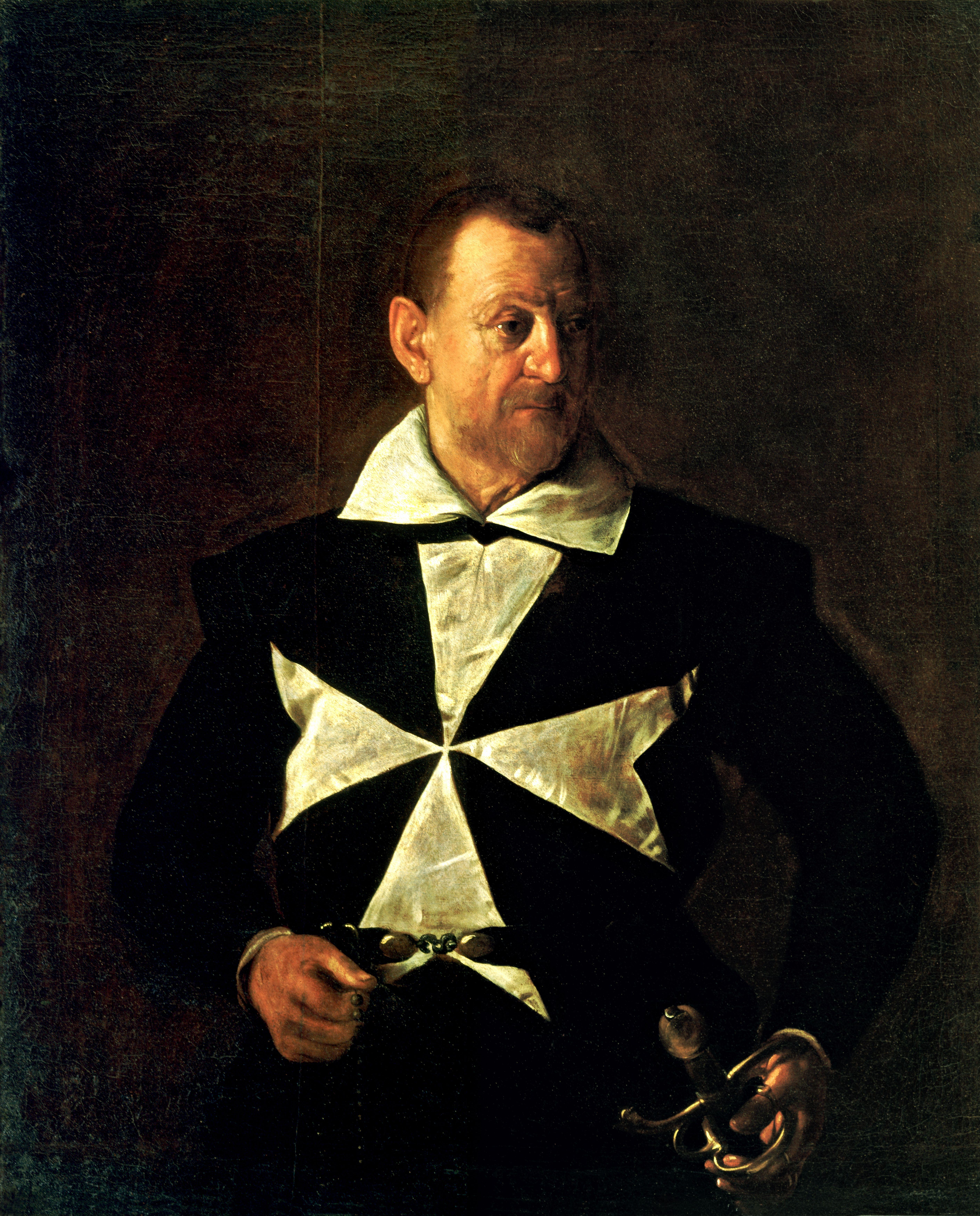
- Artist: Caravaggio
- Year: 1608
- Medium: Oil on canvas
- Dimensions: 118.5 cm × 95.5 cm (46.7 in × 37.6 in)
- Location: Palazzo Pitti, Galleria Palatina; Florence

The Portrait of Fra Antonio Martelli is an oil on canvas painting by the Italian Baroque master Michelangelo Merisi da Caravaggio, from c. 1607-1608. It is held in the Palazzo Pitti, Florence.

== Attribution ==
Until recently it was thought that this painting represented Alof de Wignacourt, Grand Master of the Order of the Knights of Malta, and that it was a preparatory study for the large and famous Portrait of Alof de Wignacourt and his Page, but recent documentary discoveries indicate that it is the portrait of another prominent member of the Order, Antonio Martelli of Florence, Prior of Messina.

== Description ==
The Knight of Malta, illuminated by a glow, is depicted at half-length against a dark background, facing three-quarters to the right and wearing the uniform of the order, with the large white cross in pectore. The strong lighting carefully explores the figure's anatomical details, identifying his facial features and signs of advanced age. The work appears unfinished in the background and in some details at the bottom of the figure. It has been suggested that this was the last work Caravaggio painted in Malta.

== See also ==
- List of paintings by Caravaggio
