= Midnight in Sicily =

1996 book by Peter Robb

- Paperback edition
- Author: Peter Robb
- Language: English
- Subject: Sicily
- Genre: Non-fiction
- Published: 1996
- Media type: Print, e-book
- ISBN: 978-0571199327

Midnight in Sicily is an English-language book on Italy written by Peter Robb. The book was first published in 1996.

== Synopsis ==
Spending fourteen years in southern Italy, Peter Robb recounts his journey into the Italian mezzogiorno - chiefly Sicily, but also Naples, and reveals its culture, history, art, literature and politics. The book also explores the dysfunction and impunity that intertwined with the organised crime world or Mafia world of the area from the post World War II era up to the 1990s, and the role of seven-time prime minister Giulio Andreotti.

== Critical reception ==
New York Times wrote that "Midnight in Sicily is packed densely with events and characters that remain distinct even as Robb skips through time and place.
