= Portrait of Alof de Wignacourt and his Page =

Painting by Caravaggio

Portrait of Alof de Wignacourt
- Ritratto di Wignacourt con paggio (Italian)
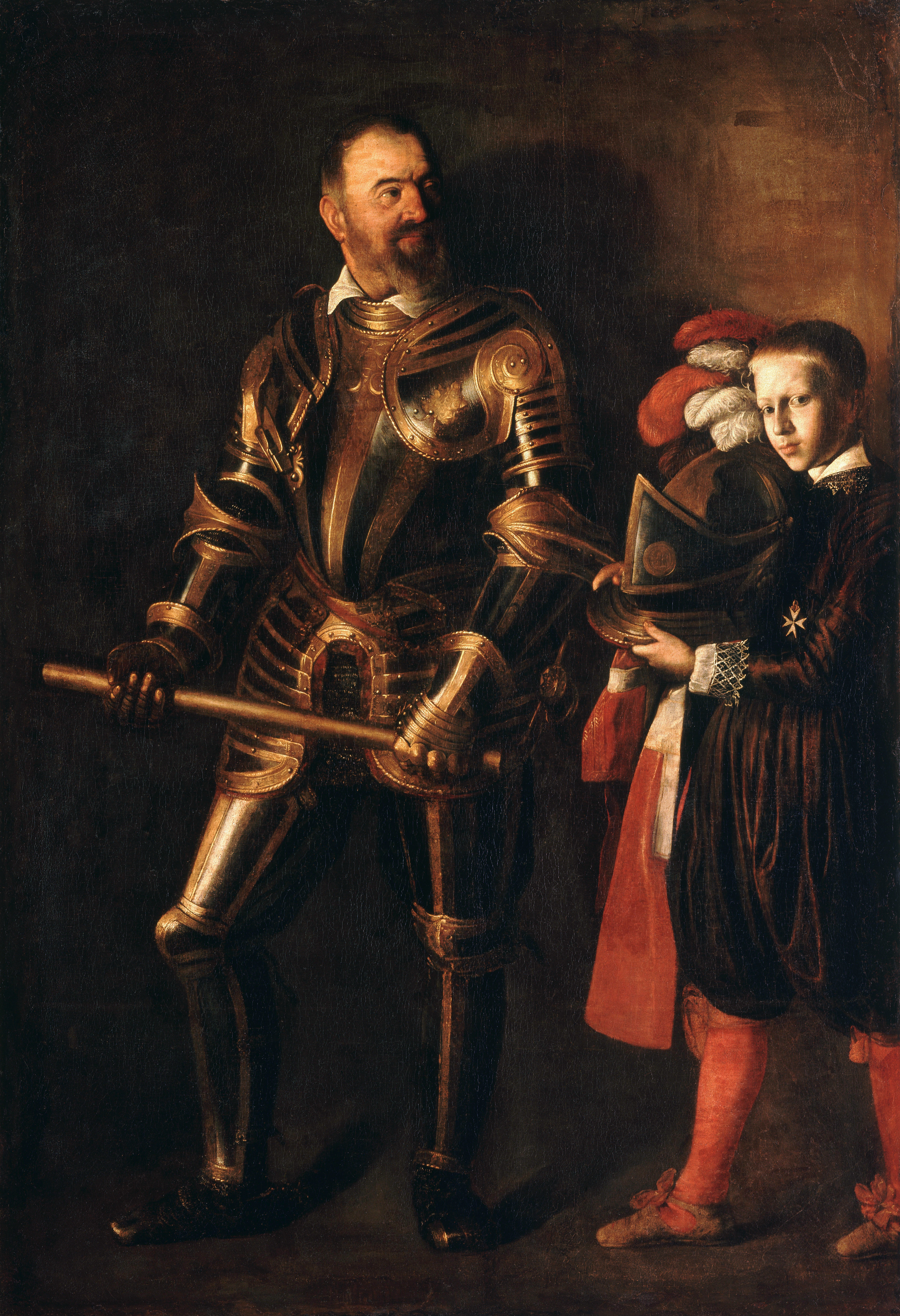
- Artist: Caravaggio
- Year: 1607–1608
- Medium: Oil on canvas
- Dimensions: 195 cm × 134 cm (77 in × 53 in)
- Location: Louvre; Paris

Portrait of Alof de Wignacourt with his Page (c. 1607–1608) is a painting by the Italian master Caravaggio, in the Louvre of Paris.

Alof de Wignacourt joined the Order of the Knights of Saint John (the Knights of Malta) in 1564, aged seventeen, and distinguished himself the next year at the Great Siege of Malta, when the Turks were defeated and never returned to the island. He was elected Grand Master in 1601, determined to enhance the prestige of the Order and its new post-siege capital, Valletta. It was not surprising, therefore, that he would welcome the opportunity to have at his court the most famous painter in Rome and Naples, Michelangelo da Caravaggio.

Caravaggio arrived in Malta from Naples in July 1607 and according to his early biographers Giovanni Baglione and Giovanni Bellori, he began at once with portraits of Wignacourt and other knights from the highest ranks of the Order. This famous portrait shows the Grand Master in formal armour, holding his baton of command, every gleaming inch an image of the military might of the Knights. At the time Wignacourt was about sixty years old. He had strengthened the fortifications of the island, built an aqueduct to guarantee water to the city, and launched several attacks on the Turks. He had turned the Knights into a sovereign power, making himself in effect a prince answerable to no-one except the Pope, with his own increasingly wealthy court.

One of his innovations had been to surround to himself with young pages, in imitation of the fashion of the princely courts. The pages were taken from the most noble Catholic families of Europe. According to John Gash and others the page in the portrait is probably Nicholas de Paris Boissy, a French aristocrat destined for a distinguished career – he became Grand Prior of France in 1657. He is placed a little awkwardly within the composition: his feet are aligned with the feet of de Wignacourt, as if standing beside de Wignacourt, but his hand and the helmet overlap Wignacourt's elbow, giving the impression that from the waist up he is in front of the knight. The fact can be explained by Caravaggio's practice of painting separately from live models – de Wignacourt and the page were apparently not together in the studio at the same time.

The boy's lively expression and alert gaze make him an attractive subject in his own right, to the extent that he was several times copied by later artists visiting Malta. Wignacourt, encased in splendid black and gold Milanese armour, stares upwards and outwards out of the frame in a dignified manner that invites the viewer to gaze upon him in awe, leaving the page, with his look of boyish interest, as the sole thoroughly human presence, and a far more sympathetic one than the self-conscious man of steel. The double-portrait with the pageboy was an unusual combination for the time. It may have been ordered by Wignacourt to stress the dignity of his court, or Caravaggio may have been inspired by a painting by Titian that he could have seen in his youth in Milan, Alfonso d'Avalos Addressing his Troops, showing the Spanish governor of the city addressing his knights with a page beside him holding his helmet.

== See also ==
- List of paintings by Caravaggio

== Sources ==
- Sammut, E. (1949). "Caravaggio in Malta" (PDF). Scientia. 15 (2): 78–89. Archived from the original on April 17, 2016.
- Gash, John (2004). Caravaggio. Chaucer. ISBN 1-904449-22-0.
- Giorgi, Rosa (1999). Caravaggio: Master of light and dark - his life in paintings. Dorling Kindersley. ISBN 0-7894-4138-1.
- Langdon, Helen (1998). Caravaggio: A Life. Farrar, Straus and Giroux. ISBN 0-374-11894-9.
- Robb, Peter (1998). M. Macmillan. ISBN 0-312-27474-2.
