= Mesrop of Khizan =

Mesrop of Khizan (c. 1560 – c. 1652) was a prominent Armenian manuscript illuminator in Persia. Mesrop was born in the Ottoman Empire but eventually lived in Isfahan, Persia, where he contributed in the making of manuscripts for bibles and gospels for four decades. He was also a scribe, clerk, teacher, doctor of theology, restorer and binder. His manuscripts have been displayed in museums throughout the world and are found in many prestigious libraries.

== Life ==
Mesrop of Khizan was born to Armenian parents in circa 1560 and is believed to be from the region of Khizan (now known as Hizan) near Lake Van located in the Ottoman Empire. The Armenians of Khizan were noted for illuminated manuscript making and would later be regarded as the Khizan School of art. After Abbas I of Persia defeated the Ottoman Empire around Lake Van, he forcibly relocated many Armenians of the region to his new capital of Isfahan in 1604. After the family had moved, Mesrop's father Martiros, who was a painter himself, continued to teach his son how to paint in the early stages of his life. Mesrop of Khizan's career spans four decades, with his last known artwork dated in 1651.

== Works ==
Among the first works of Mesrop is the Gospel of 1608. The first manuscript was done for a priest named Khatchatur and received many sponsors from various wealthy Armenians. This was soon followed by the Gospel of 1609, which is part of the Bodleian Library, the main research library of the University of Oxford. The Gospel of 1609 contains lamentations of the fall of Armenia under Shah Abbas:

Mourning fell upon Armenia, for he [Shah Abbas] destroyed and made desolate all houses and habitations, so that men fled and hid themselves in fortresses and clefts of rocks. Some he found and slew, others he led captive and sent to that city of Shosh or Aspahan [Isfahan]...And he settled us on the south side of the river Zandar...where we built houses and habitations and churches for our prayers.

Art historian Alice Taylor describes Mesrop's work as "less lively" than other contemporaneous Khizan painters, but his "settings are charged with life and energy". In one such painting, The Baptism of Christ, Jesus Christ is featured stepping on the head of a dragon that is swimming in a river. The scene around the baptized Christ is beneath a sky that appears to be melting, and a dove, symbolizing the Holy Spirit, entering the soul of Christ from above of his head.

Saint John the Evangelist, a painting done in 1615 that is now part of the J. Paul Getty Museum, features John the Apostle receiving the word of God through a ray of blue light. John is surrounded by yellow light and elongated figures. About thirty manuscripts done by Mesrob of Khizan survive today.

== Gallery ==
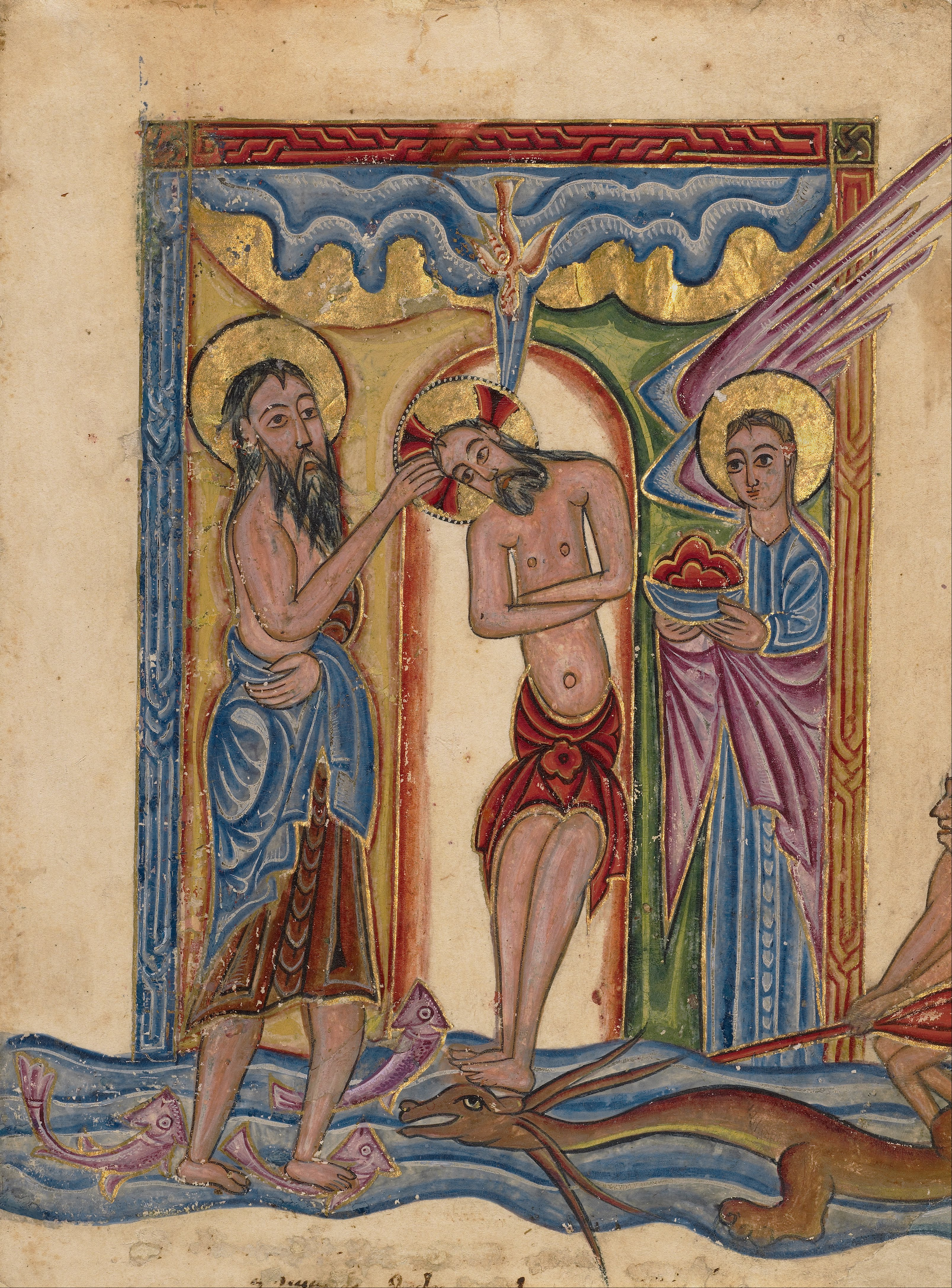
The Baptism of Christ, 1615

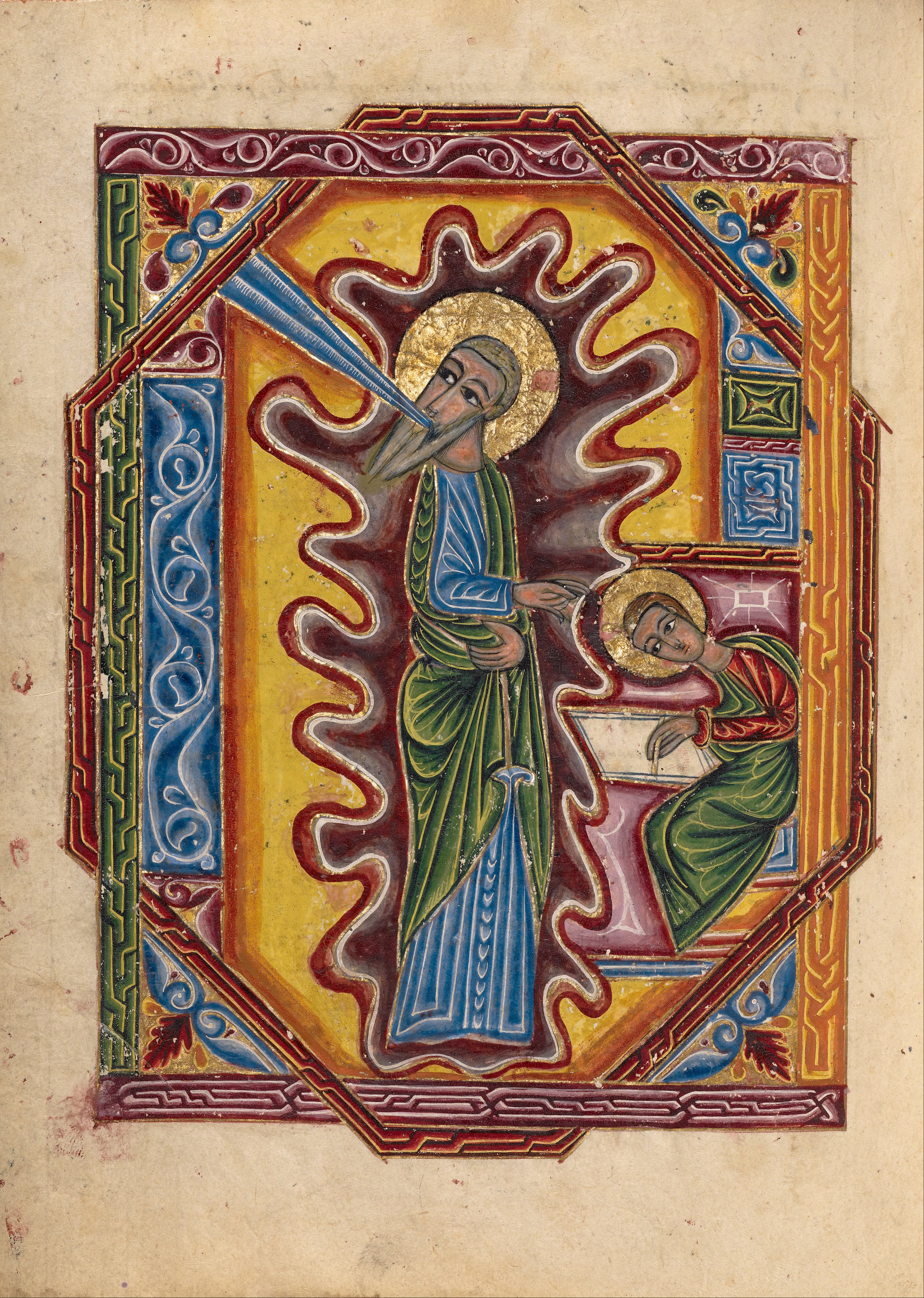
Saint John the Evangelist, 1615

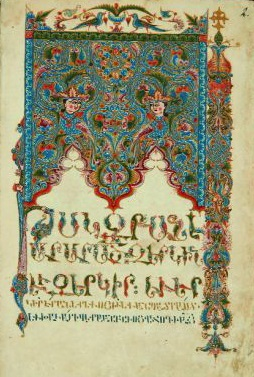
Armenian Bible by Mesrop of Khizan

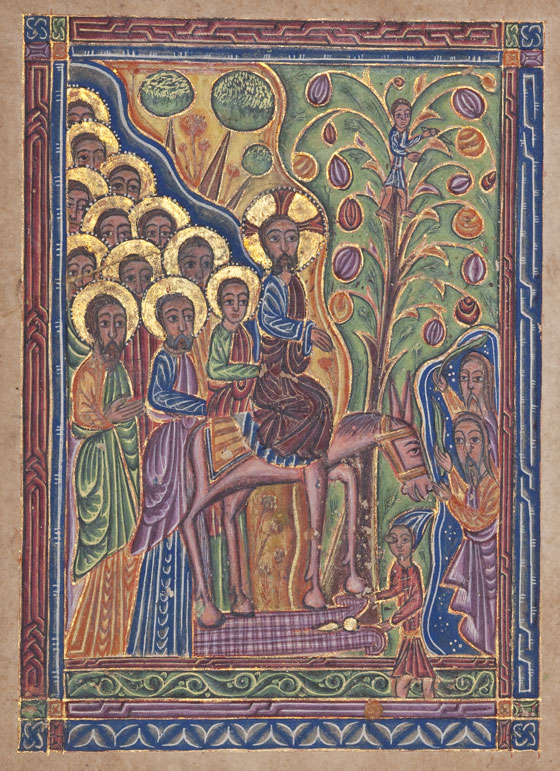
Christ's Entry into Jerusalem, 1618–1622

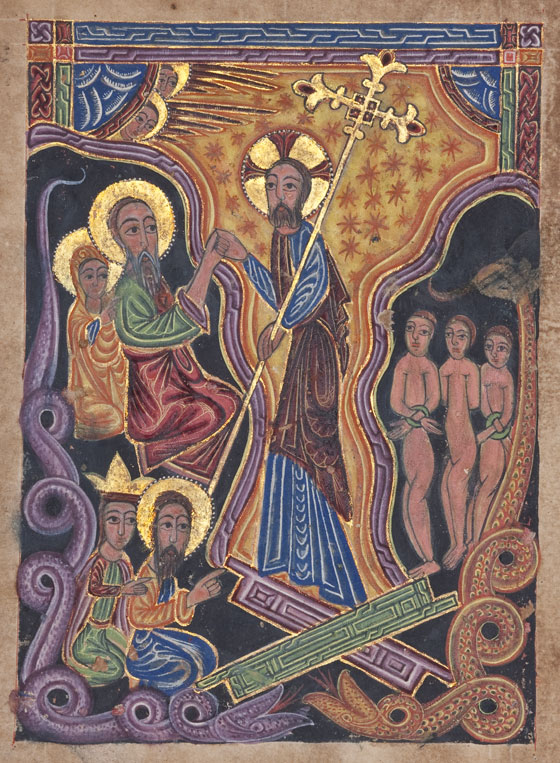
Harrowing of Hell, 1618–1622
