= Niccolò Laniere =

Italian painter

Niccolò Laniere (1568–1646), known by the French name Nicholas Lanière in England, was an Italian painter of the Baroque period, while born in Italy, was active in the England of Charles I. He was involved in making art purchases for the Royal collection. He was also an engraver and is credited in contemporary records as scene-painter and musician. He died in London.
