= Sleeping Cupid (Caravaggio) =

Painting by Caravaggio

- Amorino dormiente (Italian)
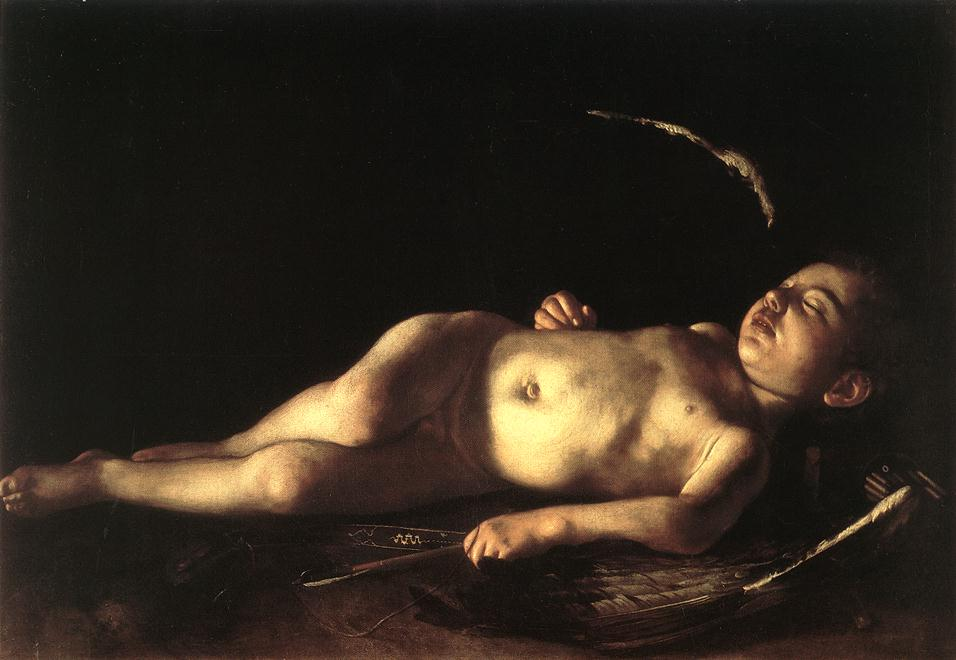
- Artist: Caravaggio
- Year: 1608
- Medium: Oil on canvas
- Dimensions: 72 cm × 105 cm (28 in × 41 in)
- Location: Palazzo Pitti, Galleria Palatina; Florence

Sleeping Cupid is a painting by the Italian master Caravaggio. Unlike many of Caravaggio's works, it can be dated accurately. It was commissioned for Fra Francesco dell'Antella, Florentine Secretary for Italy to Alof de Wignacourt, Grand Master of the Knights of Malta, and an old inscription on the back records that it was painted in Malta in 1608.

The subject of a sleeping Cupid, bowstring broken and arrows cast aside, usually signifies the abandonment of worldly pleasures, and dell'Antella may have commissioned it as a reminder of his vow of chastity.

== See also ==
- List of paintings by Caravaggio

== Secondary sources ==
- Walter Friedlaender, Caravaggio Studies, Princeton: Princeton University Press 1955, p. 132 and p. 212, cat. 38 A.
- Silvia Meloni Trkulja, Per l’”Amore dormiente” del Caravaggio, in: Paragone. Arte, 28, 331, 1977, pp. 46–50.
- Howard Hibbard, Caravaggio (1983), p. 234, 262 ISBN 978-0-06-433322-1
- Claudio Pizzorusso, Un ‘tranquillo dio’: Giovanni da San Giovanni e Caravaggio, in: Paragone. Rivista mensile di arte figurativa e letteratura, 34, 405, 1983, pp. 50–59.
- Avigdor W. G. Posèq, A Note on Caravaggio’s “Sleeping Amor”, in: Source. Notes in the History of Art, Summer 1987, Vol. 6, Nr. 4, pp. 27–31.
- Andreas Prater, Licht und Farbe bei Caravaggio: Studien zur Ästhetik und Ikonologie des Helldunkels, Stuttgart 1992, pp. 141–148.
- David M. Stone, In Praise of Caravaggio’s Sleeping Cupid. New Documents for Francesco dell’Antella in Malta and Florence, in: Melita Historica, 12, 2, 1997, pp. 165–177.
- Helen Langdon, Caravaggio: A Life, London, 1999, p. 355 ISBN 0-7126-6582-X
- Valeska von Rosen, Caravaggio und die Grenzen des Darstellbaren: Ambiguität, Ironie und Performativität in der Malerei um 1600, Berlin: Akademie-Verlag, 2009, pp. 217–223
- Helen Langdon, Caravaggio and Cupid: Homage and Rivalry in Rome and Florence, Edinburgh, 2017
- Genevieve Warwick, Memory’s Cut: Caravaggio’s Sleeping Cupid of 1608, in: Art History, 40, 4, 2017, pp. 884–903.
- Francesco Zucconi, Displacing Caravaggio: Art, Media, and Humanitarian Visual Culture, Cham 2018, pp. 183-198.
