= M (Peter Robb book) =

1998 book by Peter Robb

- Author: Peter Robb
- Language: English
- Subject: painter Caravaggio
- Publisher: Duffy & Snellgrove
- Publication date: 1998
- Publication place: Australia
- Pages: 80
- Awards: (Australian) National Biography Award; Victorian Premier's Award
- ISBN: 0-312-27474-2

M is a book by Australian author Peter Robb about the Italian painter Michelangelo Merisi da Caravaggio. First published in 1998 in Australia by Duffy & Snellgrove, the book provoked controversy when it was published in Britain in 2000. It was published in the United States as M: The Man Who Became Caravaggio (New York: Henry Holt, 2000).

M won the (Australian) National Biography Award and the Victorian Premier's Award.
