= Peter Robb (author) =

Australian author (born 1946)

- Born: 1946 (age 79–80); Toorak, Victoria, Australia
- Occupation: Novelist
- Writing career
- Notable awards: 2004 The Age Book of the Year Award — Non-Fiction Prize, winner

Peter Robb (born 1946) is an Australian author, who has also written under the pen names B. Selkie and Ross Edwards.

== Early life and education ==
Robb was born 1946 in Toorak, Melbourne. He spent his early years in Australia and was educated in New Zealand.

He was involved in a small Trotskyist organisation named the Communist League, which was sympathetic to the Fourth International, between 1972 and 1978, although Robb did not join the organisation until 1975. Robb helped produced its newspaper, Militant, and was also key in the departure of a section of the Communist League's leadership, through absorption by the Socialist Workers Party (SWP) in 1976. The group was co-founded by Queensland doctor John McCarthy (1948–2008), who played a major role in integrating the CL and the SWP, and activist and later academic Marcia Langton was the third member of the CL committee. McCarthy broke away from the SWP (then Socialist Workers League) to create CL, and then, along with Robb and Langton, rejoined the SWP four years later, in November 1976.

== Career ==
Robb left Australia for Europe in 1971, where he worked for several years before returning home. In 1978, he moved to Italy and spent the next 15 years primarily in Naples and southern Italy, with occasional sojourns to Brazil. He returned to Sydney at the end of 1992. His experiences in southern Italy formed the basis of his first book, Midnight in Sicily (1996).

His 1998 biography of the Italian artist Caravaggio, titled M, provoked significant controversy upon its British release two years later. He followed this in December 1999 with Pig's Blood and Other Fluids, a collection of three crime fiction novellas.

Robb's later works continued to explore his interests in Italy and South America, including A Death in Brazil (2003) and Street Fight in Naples, published by Allen & Unwin in October 2010. Throughout his career, Robb has also written under the pen names B. Selkie and Ross Edwards.

== Plagiarism allegations ==
In 2004, former Veja editor Mario Sergio Conti accused Robb of appropriating material from Conti's Brazil-published book Noticias do Planalto (News from the Presidential Palace) for A Death in Brazil. Conti branded Robb "a rude thief, a colonial predator, a privateer sure of his own impunity" who "just copied [my book] because it is written in a language that no one in the rich countries understands." Robb denied he had plagiarised from Conti and responded: "It is normal practice for historians and journalists to draw on previous published sources for their own work, and correct practice to acknowledge and cite them. I do both. Facts are public property."

== Academia ==
Robb has taught at the University of Melbourne, the University of Oulu in Finland, and the Istituto Universitario Orientale in Naples.

== Recognition and awards ==
- 1997: Nettie Palmer Prize for Non-fiction (the non-fiction prize of the Victorian Premier's Literary Award), for Midnight in Sicily
- 2004: The Age Book of the Year Awards – Non-fiction, for A Death in Brazil
- 2012: Appointed the first CAL Non-Fiction Writer-in-Residence at the University of Technology, Sydney.

== Selected works ==
=== Books ===
- Midnight in Sicily (1996)
- M (1998)
- Pig's Blood and Other Fluids (1999)
- A Death in Brazil (2003)
- Street Fight in Naples (2010)
- Lives (2012)

=== Essays ===
- Robb, Peter (August 2014). "Brand management : the peripatetic director of the Art Gallery of NSW". The Monthly. 103: 32–37. Archived from the original on 3 January 2018.
