= Saint Andrew (Ribera, Naples) =

Painting by Jusepe di Ribera

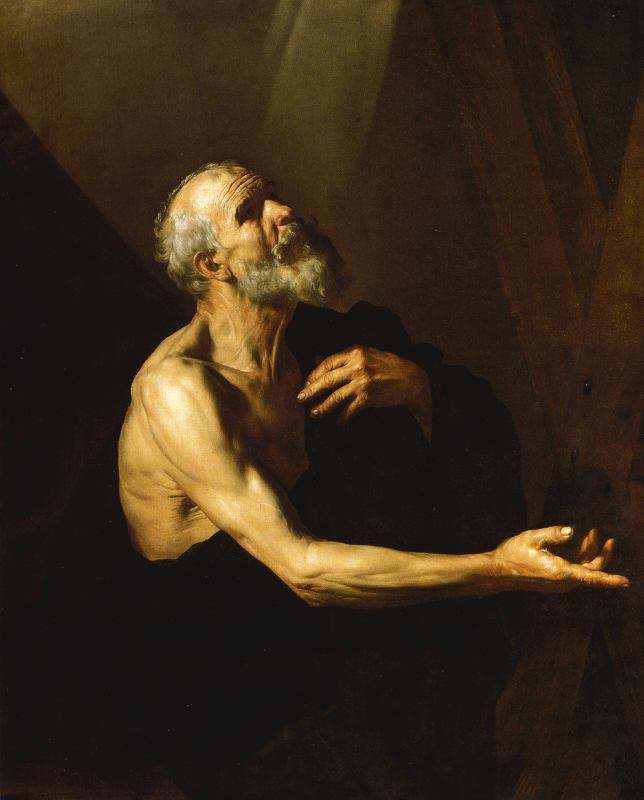
Saint Andrew (c. 1620–1625) by Jusepe de Ribera

Saint Andrew is an early painting by Jusepe de Ribera, now in the Quadreria dei Girolamini in Naples. It shows Andrew the Apostle with his diagonal cross behind him.

The work was probably produced sometime between 1600 and 1625 during his first stay in Naples just after his time in Rome whilst still heavily influenced by Caravaggism. It probably formed part of a group of works showing Christ and the Twelve Apostles - the Quadreria also houses a St Peter and St James the Great by the artist, but the other works from the group are lost. It also houses a St Paul and a Flagellation of Christ, both also by Ribera.

== Bibliography ==
- Spinosa N., Ribera - Opera completa, Editrice Electa (2006)
