= Victorious Cupid =

Victorious Cupid is an oil painting, see Amor Vincit Omnia (Caravaggio).

Victorious Cupid may also refer to:

- "Victorious Cupid", another similar oil painting (Omnia vincit amor), see Master of the Gamblers
- "Victorious Cupid", a 2007 song by the rock group Pure Reason Revolution
- "Victorious Cupid", a 2009 album by Pure Reason Revolution, see Amor Vincit Omnia (Pure Reason Revolution album)

== See also ==
- Love Conquers All (disambiguation)
