= Jan van Dalen =

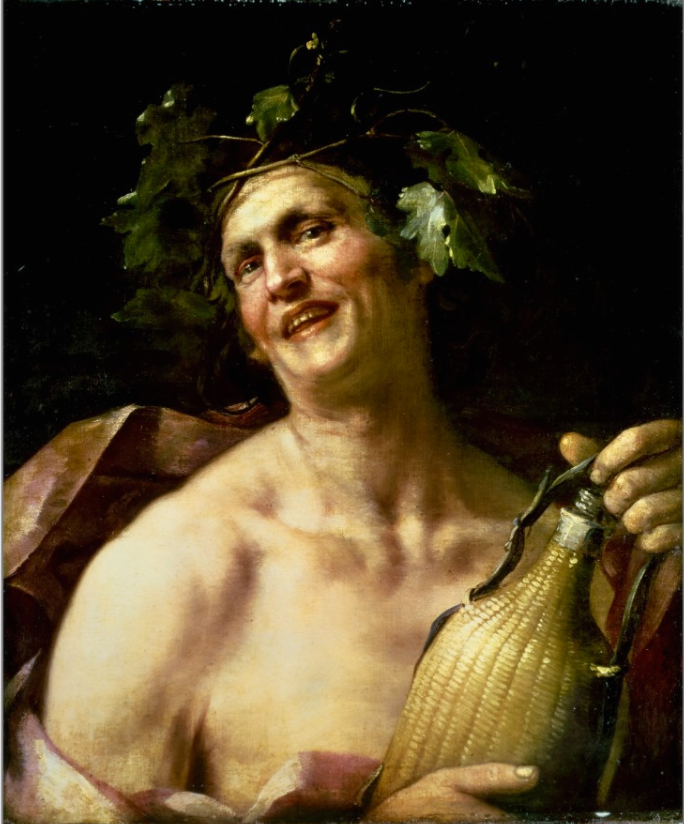
Laughing Bacchus, possibly a self portrait

Jan van Dalen or Jan van Dalen (I) (fl. 1632 – 1670) was a Flemish painter active in Antwerp in the mid-17th century who is known for a few works executed in a Caravaggesque style. His work has been confused with a namesake referred to as Jan van Dalen (II) (Gorinchem c. 1610 - after 1677) who was active in the Dutch Republic and is known for still lifes and portraits.

== Life ==
Very little is known about the life of Jan van Dalen. His date of birth is placed between 1600 and 1620 and his time of death some time between 1662 and 1682.

He is believed to have trained in Rome around 1630. He was likely responsible for a pair of paintings signed and dated 'J. van Dalen fec. in Roma 1631' (Woman holding an Egg and Boy holding a Glass), which were previously in the Liechtenstein Collection in Vienna. He must then have returned to Antwerp where he was registered in 1632-1633 as a pupil of Daniel Middeleer (also called Daniel Middeler and Daniël de Middelaer). Middeleer was a painter, printmaker and publisher whose other well-known pupils included Cornelis de Bryer and Frans Geffels.

The artist is believed to have remained active in Antwerp where he is mentioned for the last time in 1669–1670.

== Work ==
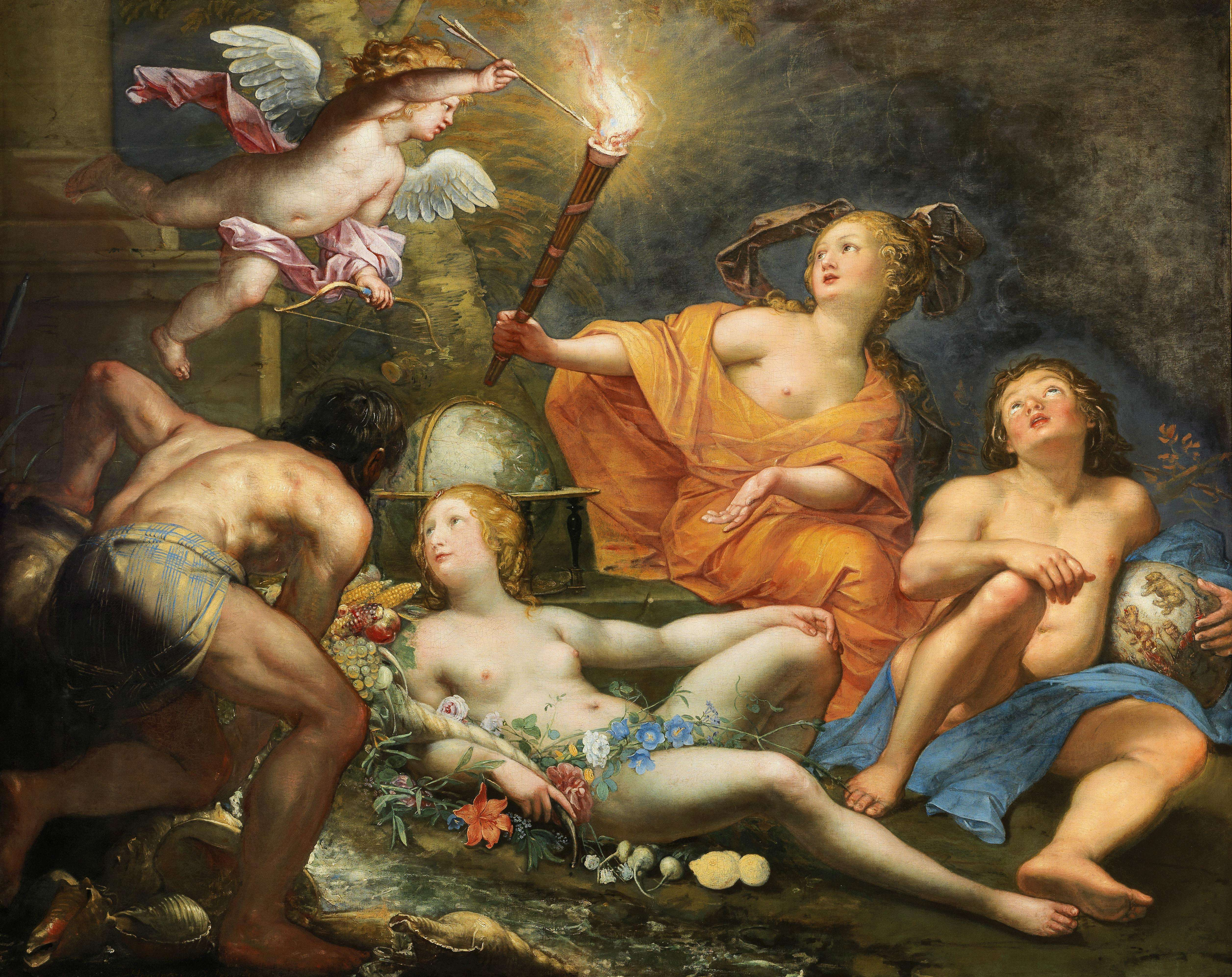
Allegory of the Four Elements

Only very few autograph works by Jan van Dalen are known. One is an Allegory of the Four Elements (Christie's sale 20–21 November 2013, Amsterdam, lot 128), which is fully signed and dated 1653. A Tambourine player of the same date and signed with initials is in the Michaelis Collection in Cape Town. A half-length figure of a Bacchus in the Kunsthistorisches Museum is also signed with initials and dated 1648.

Van Dalen's style reflects influences of artists of the early Roman Baroque. His Allegory of the Four Elements is a typical nocturnal scene in the tradition of Roman and Dutch Caravaggism. The dramatic lighting and figural recall nocturnal scenes of the artist Alessandro Turchi active in Rome.

The influence of Caravaggio and the first generation of his followers is more evident in his earlier works. He was exposed to these influences during his time in Rome around 1630. After his return to Antwerp he likely came under the influence of Flemish artists. As a result, his later works show a blending of Italian and northern styles.

Van Dalen painted a number of portraits of Bacchus, the ancient god of fertility and wine. In the version in the Museum of Fine Arts (Budapest) the artist possibly portrayed himself as the laughing Bacchus. In the version in the Kunsthistorisches Museum Jan van Dalen gave the deity a mischievous and challenging expression which appears to invite the viewer to enjoy a glass of wine with him. The wild and boisterous character of the god and his disregard for, and transgression of, limits and borders are emphasized by the wreath of ivy he is wearing.
