= Caravaggisti =

Stylistic followers of the painter Caravaggio

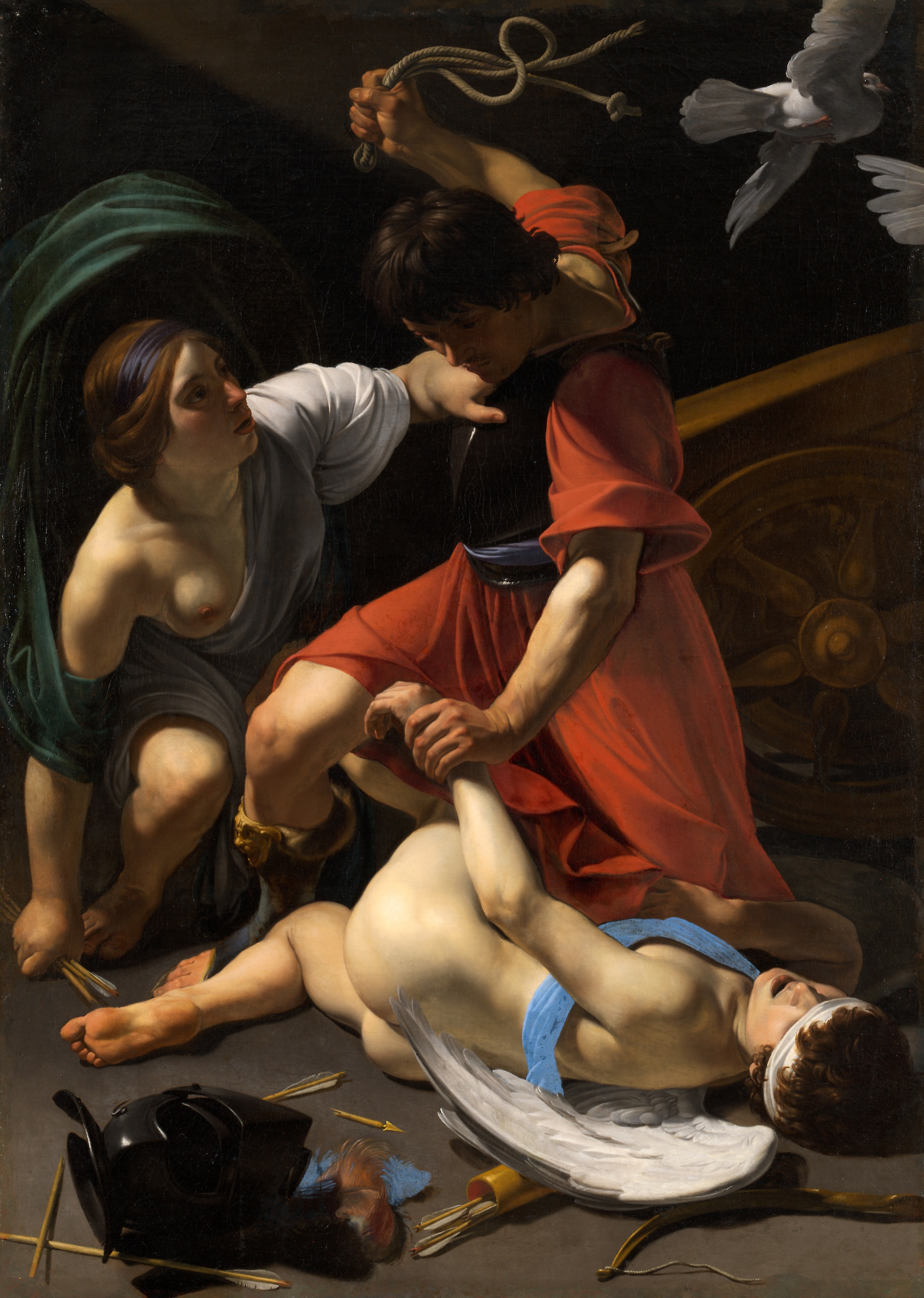
Mars Chastising Cupid (ca. 1605–1610) by Bartolomeo Manfredi

The Caravaggisti (or the "Caravagesques"; singular: "Caravaggista") were stylistic followers of the late 16th-century Italian Baroque painter Caravaggio. His influence on the new Baroque style that eventually emerged from Mannerism was profound. Caravaggio never established a workshop as most other painters did, and thus had no school to spread his techniques. Nor did he ever set out his underlying philosophical approach to art, the psychological realism which can only be deduced from his surviving work. But it can be seen directly or indirectly in the work of Rubens, Jusepe de Ribera, Bernini, and Rembrandt. Famous while he lived, Caravaggio himself was forgotten almost immediately after his death. Many of his paintings were re-ascribed to his followers, such as The Taking of Christ, which was attributed to the Dutch painter Gerrit van Honthorst until 1990.

Only in the 20th century was Caravaggio's importance to the development of Western art rediscovered. In the 1920s Roberto Longhi once more placed him in the European tradition: "Ribera, Vermeer, La Tour and Rembrandt could never have existed without him. And the art of Delacroix, Courbet and Manet would have been utterly different". The influential Bernard Berenson stated: "With the exception of Michelangelo, no other Italian painter exercised so great an influence."

== Italian ==
=== Rome ===
At the height of his popularity in Rome during the late 1590s and early 1600s, Caravaggio's dramatic new style influenced many of his peers in the Roman art world. The first Caravaggisti included Mario Minniti, Giovanni Baglione (although his Caravaggio phase was short-lived), Leonello Spada and Orazio Gentileschi. In the next generation, there were Carlo Saraceni, Bartolomeo Manfredi and Orazio Borgianni as well as anonymous masters such as the Master of the Gamblers. Gentileschi, despite being considerably older, was the only one of these artists to live much beyond 1620, and ended up as court painter to Charles I of England. His daughter Artemisia Gentileschi was also close to Caravaggio, and one of the most gifted of the movement, including the work Judith Slaying Holofernes. Yet, in Rome and in Italy, it was not Caravaggio, but the influence of Annibale Carracci, blending elements from the High Renaissance and Lombard realism, which ultimately triumphed. Other artists active in Rome, worth mentioning, include Angelo Caroselli, Pier Francesco Mola, Tommaso Salini and Francesco Buoneri. Giacinto Brandi was active mainly in Rome and Naples. Dutch painter David de Haen was active in Rome between 1615 and 1622. Bartolomeo Cavarozzi was active in Rome, but worked in Madrid from 1617 to 1618-19, and is believed to have played a role in spreading Caravaggism in Spain.

Selected works

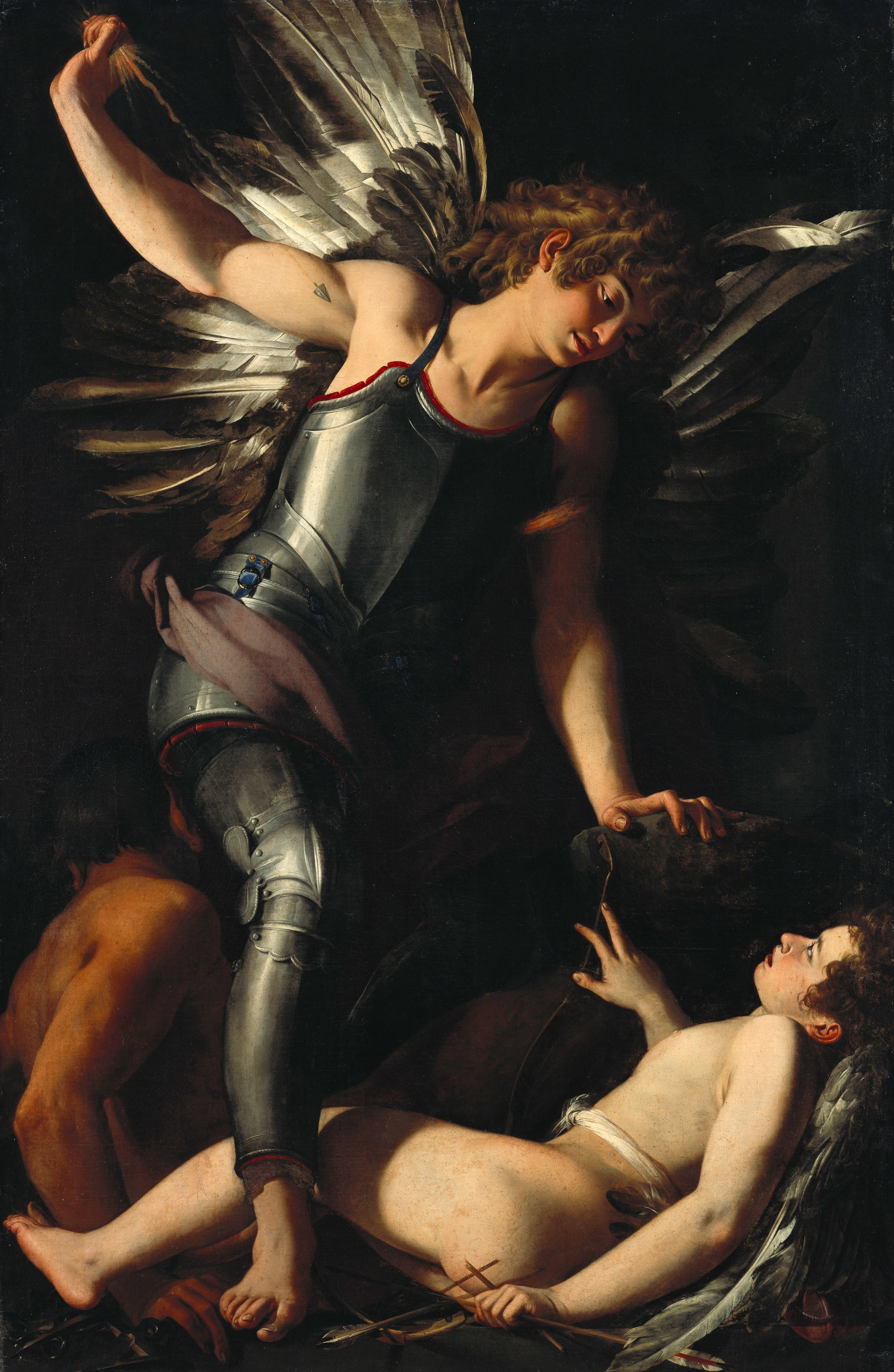
Baglione – The Divine Eros Defeats the Earthly Eros, ca. 1602, Gemäldegalerie

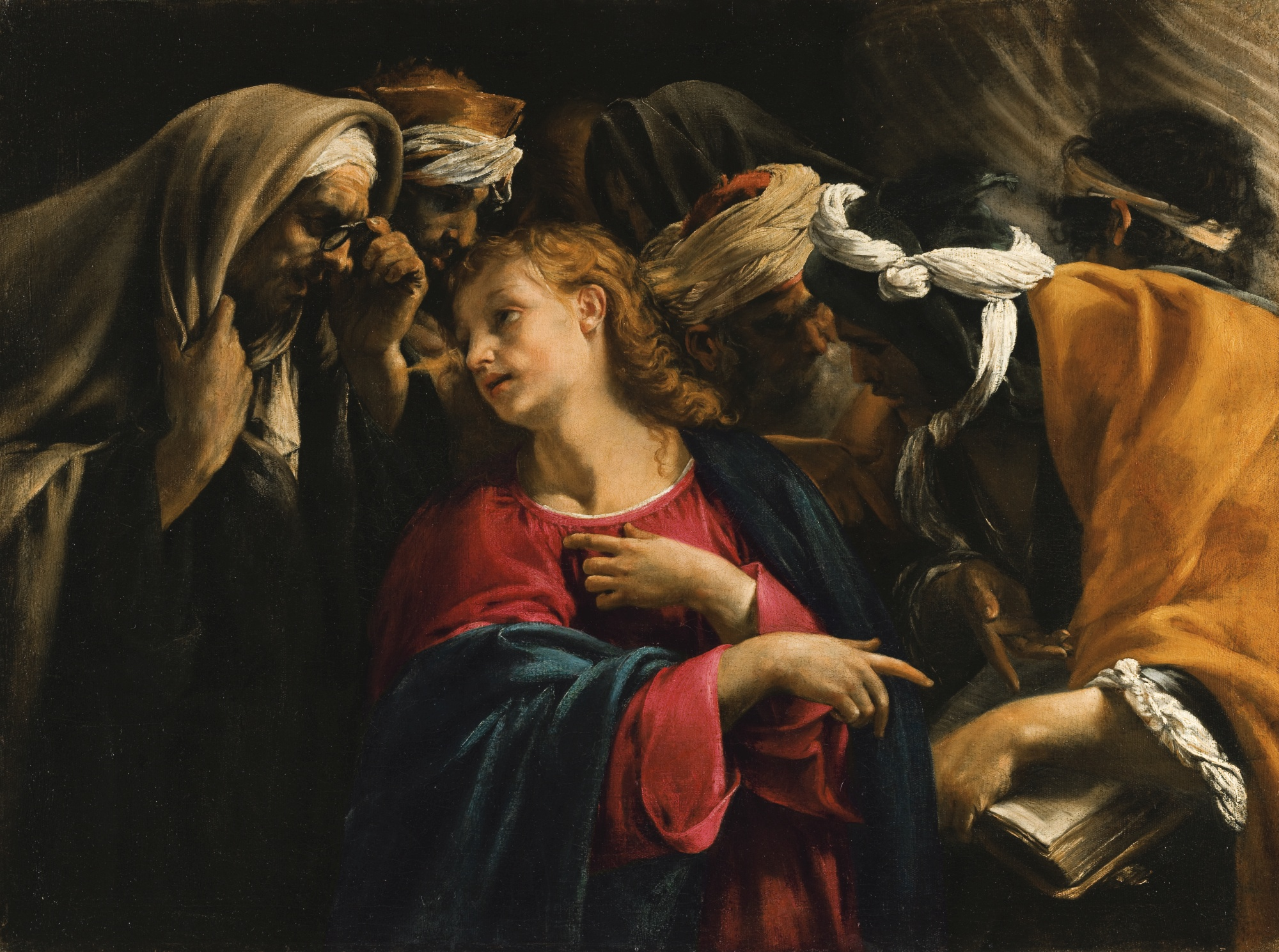
Borgianni – Christ amongst the Doctors, ca. 1605–1610

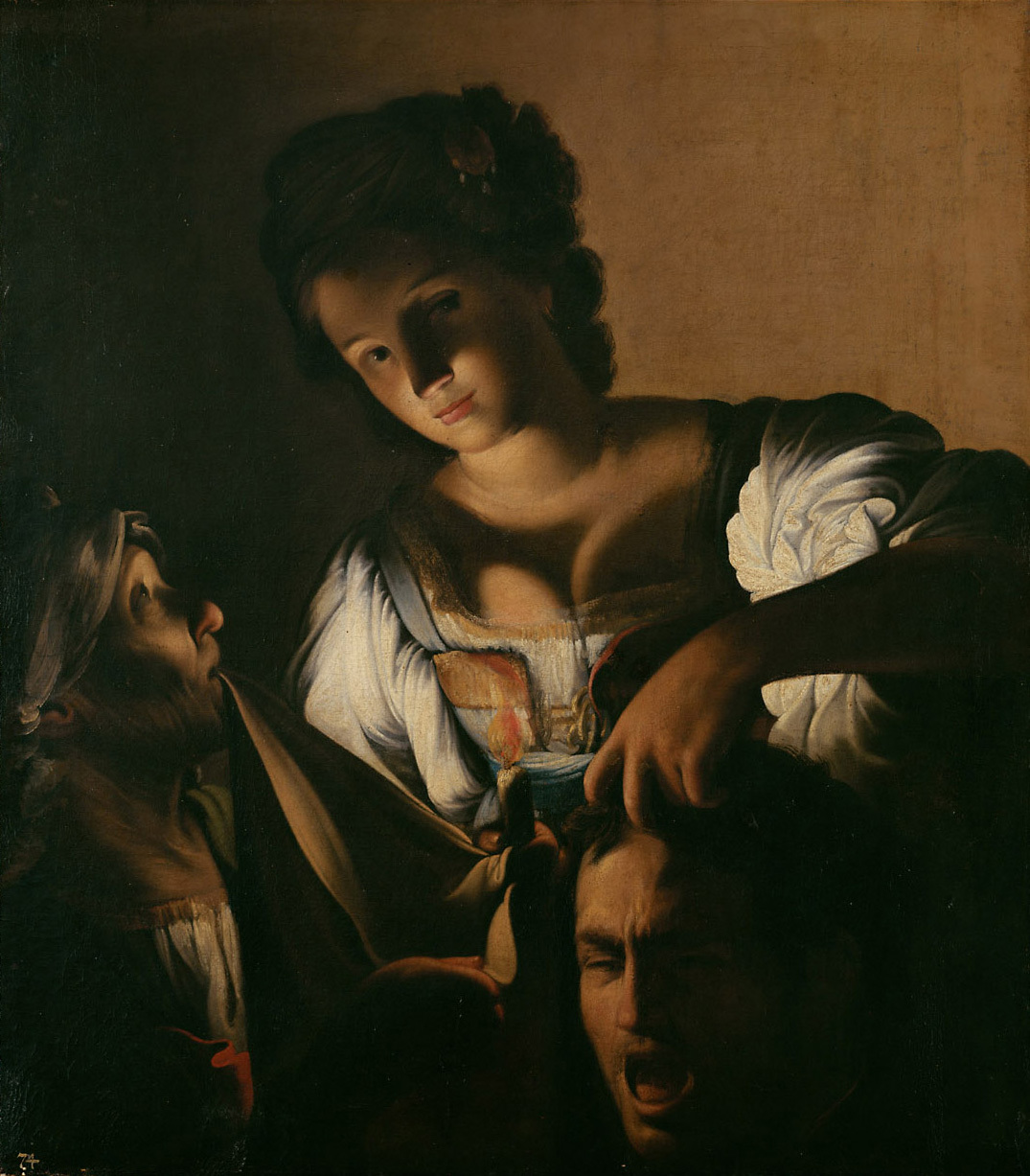
Saraceni – Judith with the Head of Holophernes, 1610–1615, Kunsthistorisches Museum

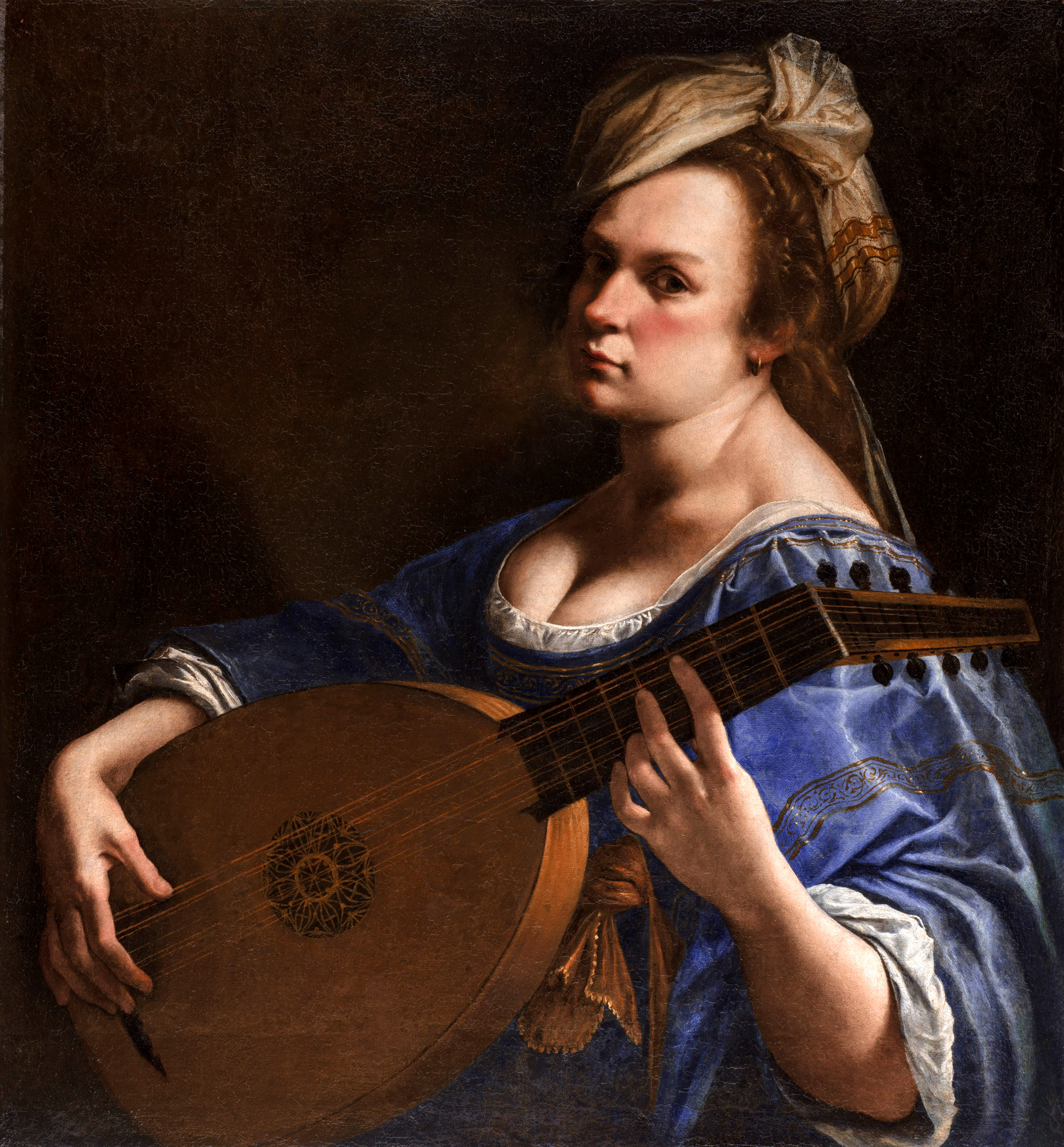
Artemisia Gentileschi – Self-Portrait as a Lute Player, 1615–1617, Wadsworth Atheneum Museum of Art

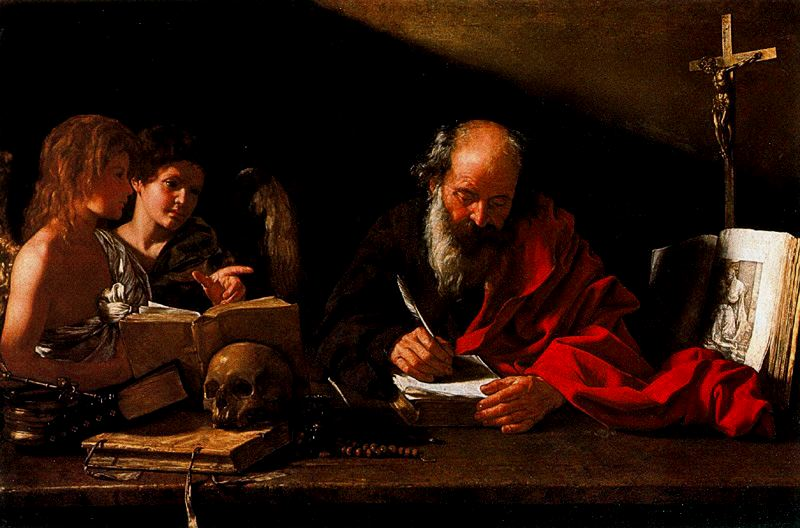
Bartolomeo Cavarozzi – Saint Jerome with Two Angels, 1617, Palazzo Pitti

=== Naples ===
In May 1606 after the killing of Ranuccio Tomassoni, Caravaggio fled to Naples with a death sentence on his head. While there he completed several commissions, two major ones being the Madonna of the Rosary, and The Seven Works of Mercy. His work had a profound effect on the local artists and his brief stay in Naples produced a notable school of Neapolitan Caravaggisti, including Battistello Caracciolo, Bernardo Cavallino, Carlo Sellitto, Massimo Stanzione, Francesco Guarino, Mattia Preti, Andrea Vaccaro, Cesare Fracanzano and Antonio de Bellis. Giacinto Brandi was active mainly in Rome and Naples. The Caravaggisti movement there ended with a terrible outbreak of plague in 1656, but at the time Naples was a possession of Spain and the influence of Caravaggism had already spread there.

Selected works

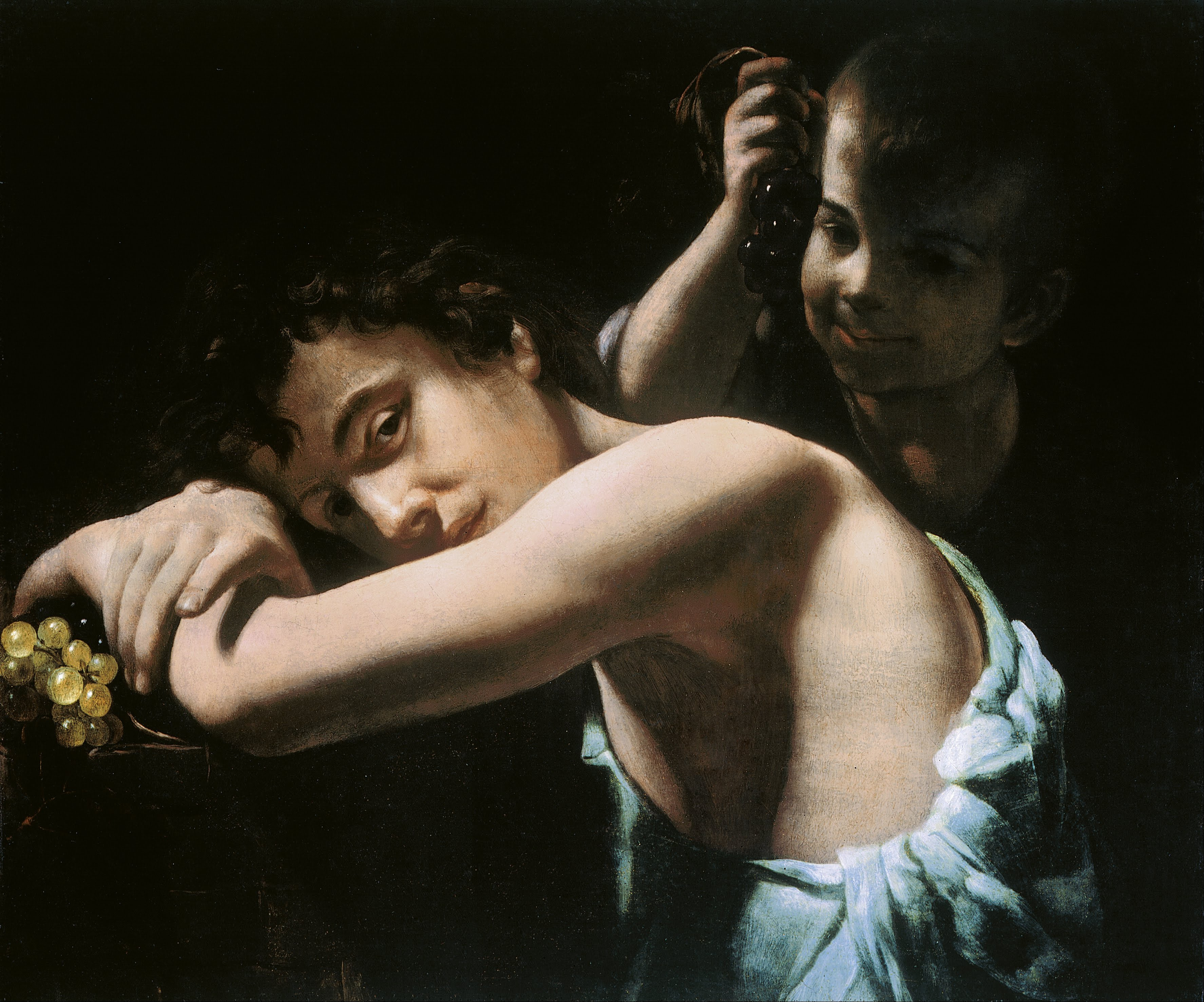
Caracciolo – Two youths with grapes, 1605–1610

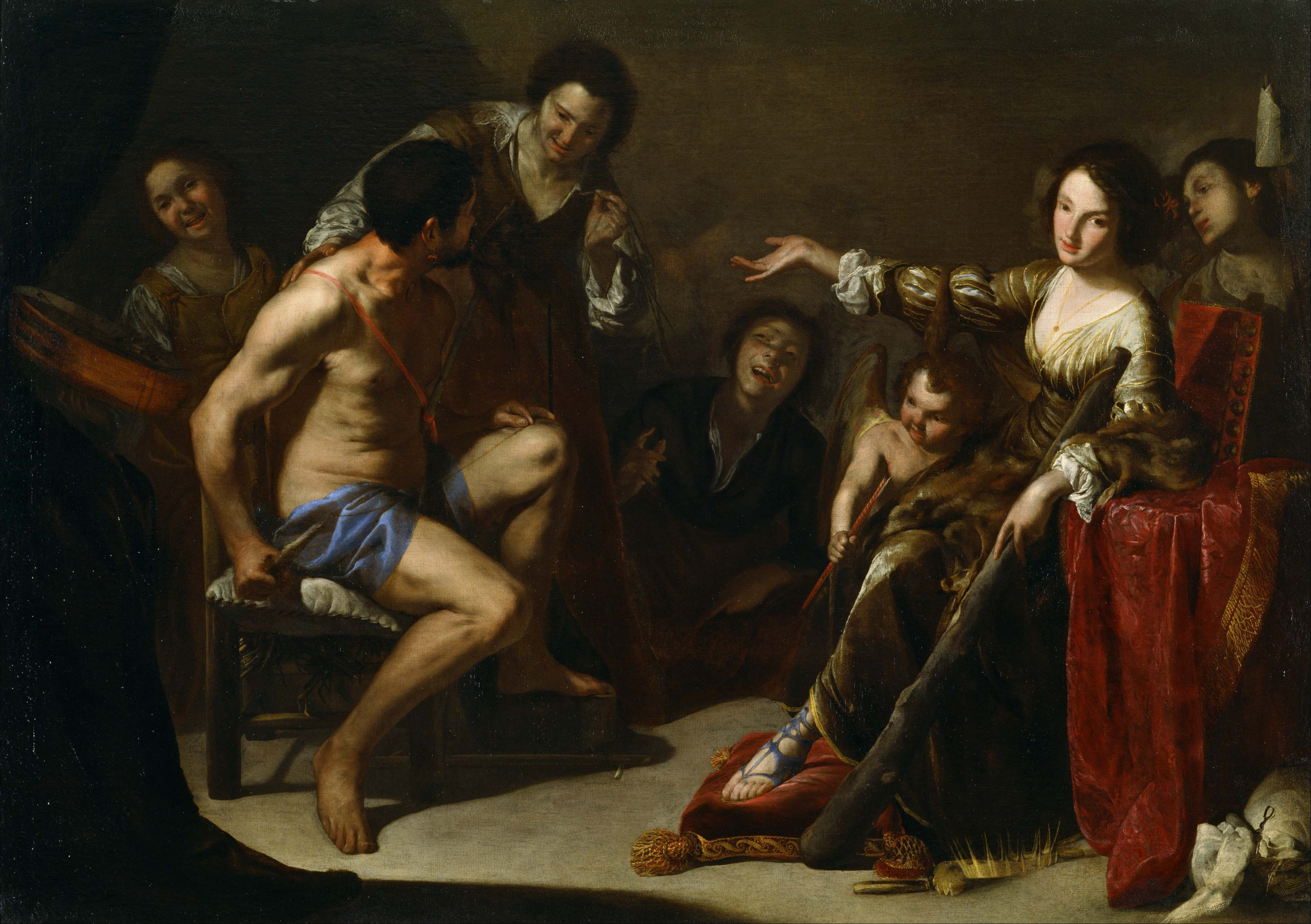
Cavallino – Hercules and Omphale, c. 1640

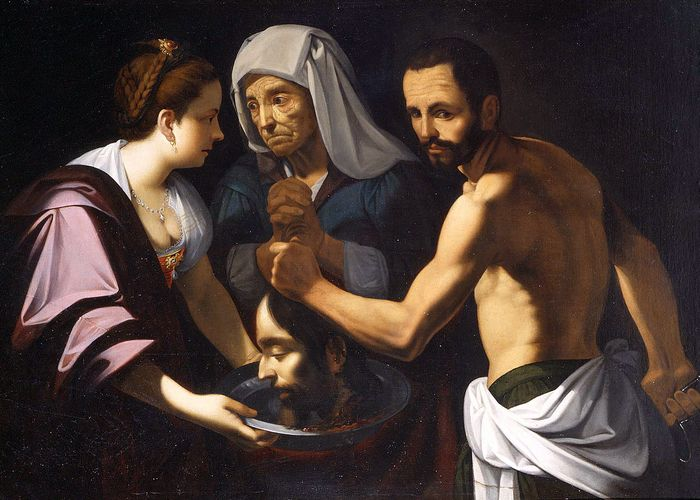
Sellitto – Salome with the Head of St John the Baptist

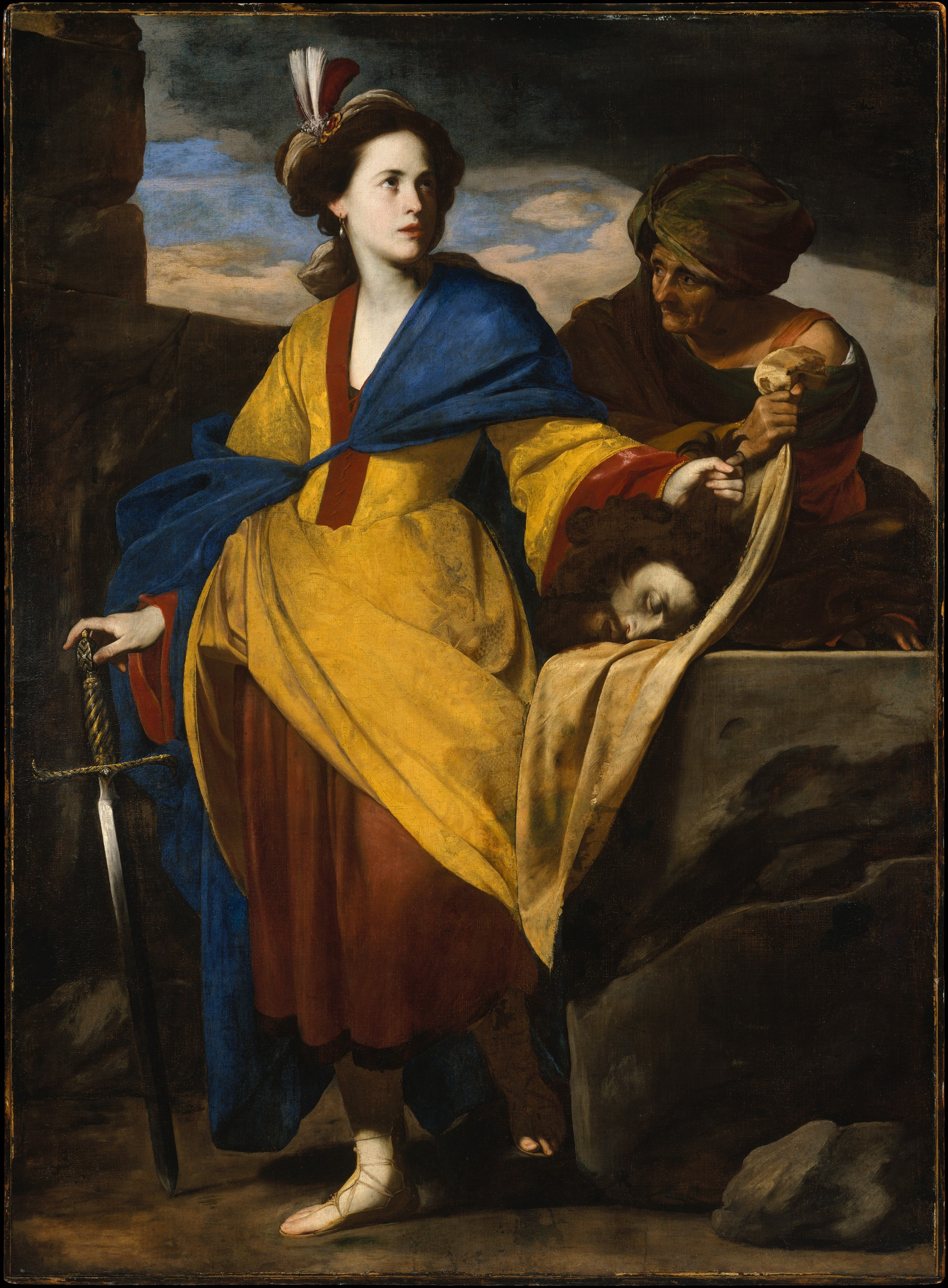
Stanzione – Judith with the Head of Holofernes, c. 1640

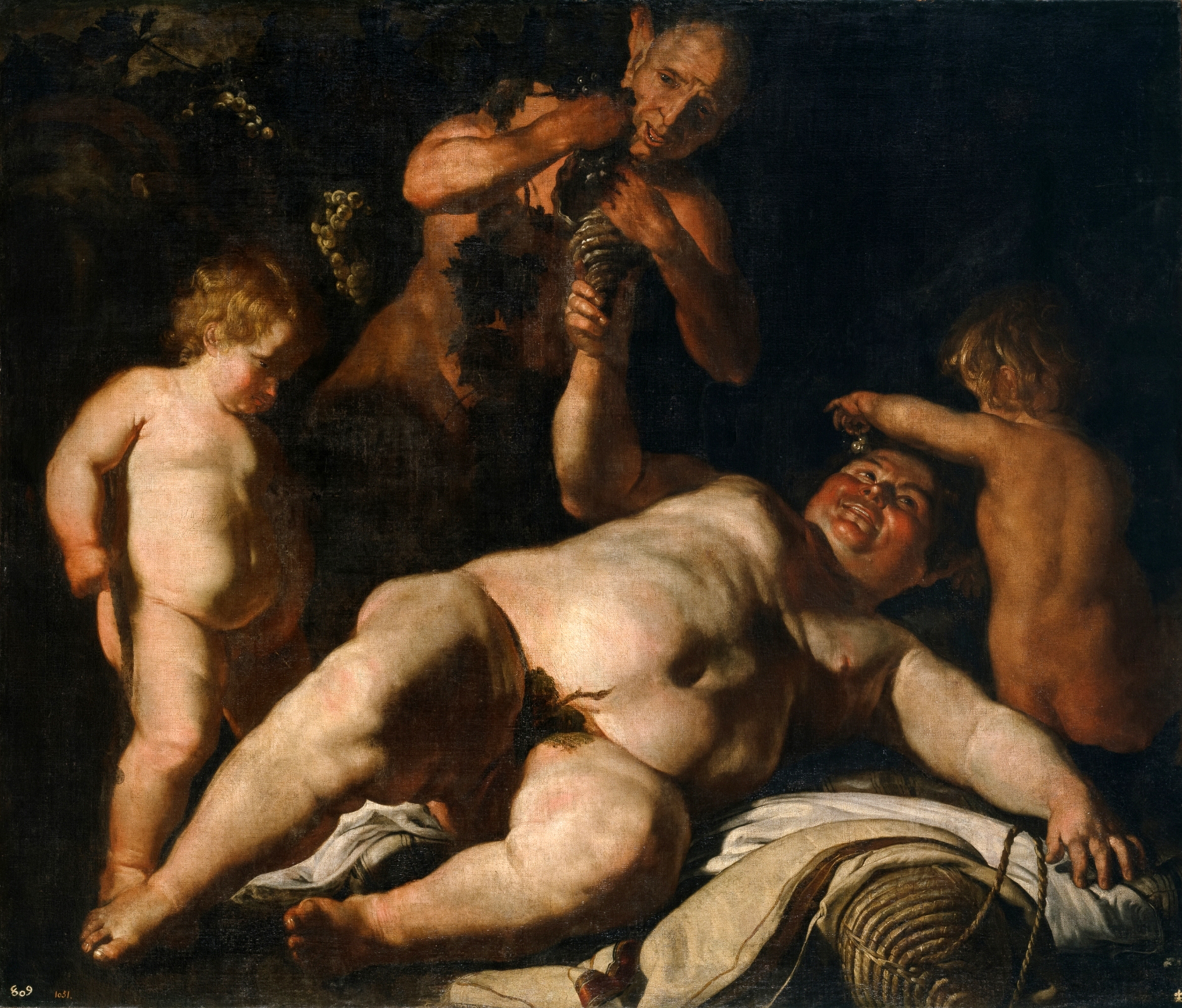
Cesare Fracanzano – Drunken Silenus, c. 1630–1635

=== Northern Italy ===
Marco Antonio Bassetti is known to have been in Rome in 1616, and may have arrived there two years earlier. In Rome he came under the influence of the paintings of Caravaggio and Orazio Borgianni. On his return to Verona he painted a St. Peter and Saints for the church of San Tomaso and a Coronation of the Virgin for Sant' Anastasia. He died from the plague in Verona in 1630.

Bernardo Strozzi, born and mainly active in Genoa and later Venice, is considered a principal founder of the Venetian Baroque style. In the 1620s Strozzi gradually abandoned his early Mannerist style in favor of a more personal style characterized by a new naturalism derived from the work of Caravaggio and his followers. The Caravaggist style of painting had been brought to Genoa both by Domenico Fiasella, after his return from Rome in 1617–18, and by followers of Caravaggio who spent time working in the city.

Italian painter Biagio Manzoni was active in Faenza. Italian painter Bartolomeo Schedoni from Reggio Emilia, Daniele Crespi from Milan and Luca Cambiasi, also known as Luca Cambiaso and Luca Cangiagio, the leading artist in Genoa in the 16th century, often depicted brilliantly lit figures set against a dark background. Felice Boselli, active in Piacenza, used contrast Caravaggisti lighting for his still-lifes. Tanzio da Varallo (or simply il Tanzio) was active mainly in Lombardy and Piedmont, including the Sacro Monte at Varallo Sesia, where he worked contemporaneously with Pier Francesco Mazzucchelli (il Morazzone). The Italian painter and engraver Bernardino Mei worked in his native Siena and in Rome, finding patronage above all in the Chigi family.

=== Central Italy ===
Pietro Ricchi (or il Lucchesino), born in Lucca, also often depicted brilliantly lit figures set against a dark background (see St. Sebastian).

=== Sicily ===
Mario Minniti was an Italian artist active in Sicily after 1606. He, at the age of 16, even posed for Caravaggio's painting Boy with a Basket of Fruit.

== Flemish ==
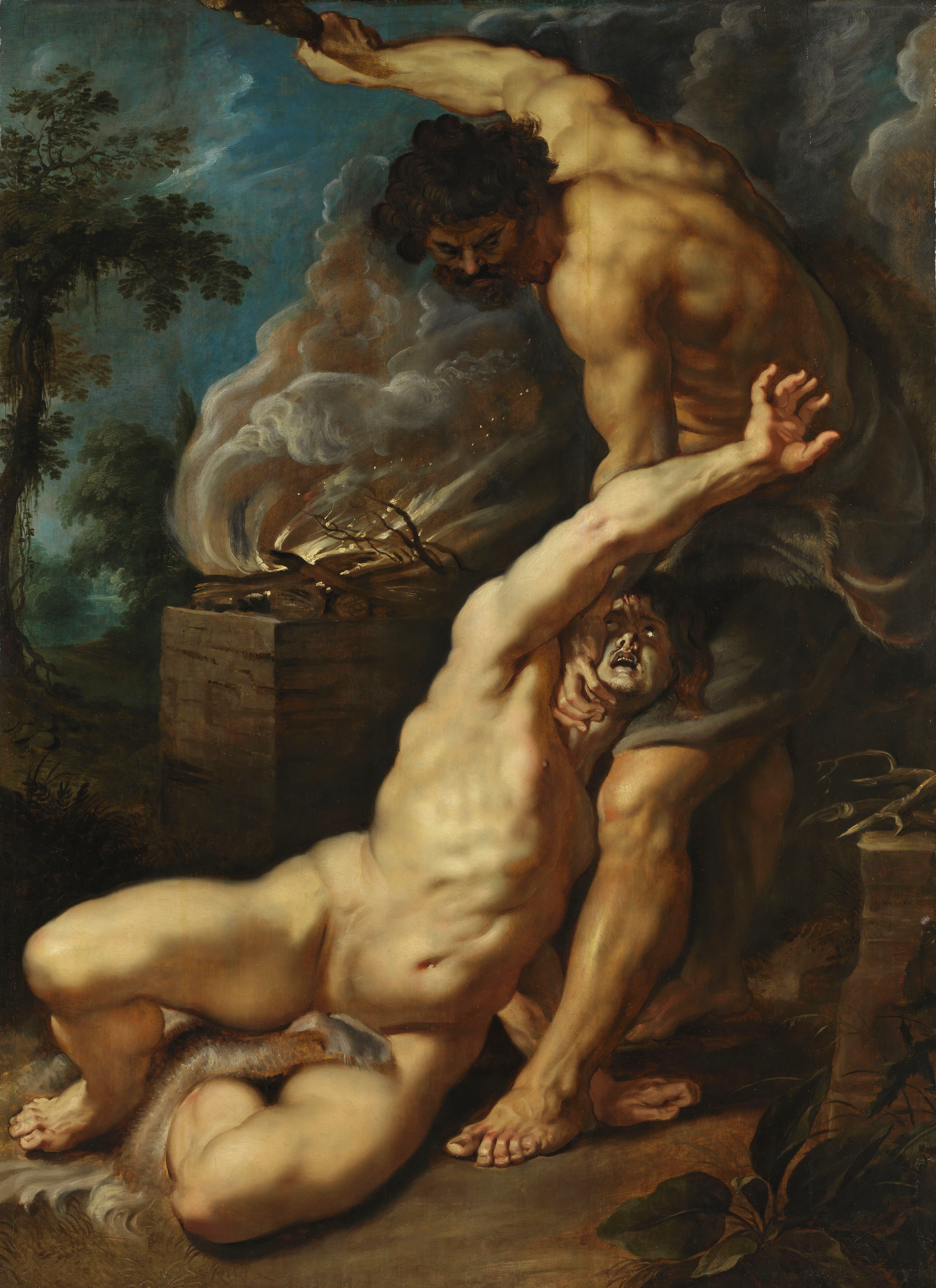
Cain slaying Abel, Rubens, 1608–09

Rubens was likely one of the first Flemish artists to be influenced by Caravaggio. During the period 1600–1608, Rubens resided in Italy. He settled in Mantua at the court of Duke Vincenzo I Gonzaga but also spent time in Rome. During his stay in Rome in 1601 he became acquainted with Caravaggio’s work. He later made a copy of Caravaggio's Entombment of Christ and recommended his patron, the Duke of Mantua, to purchase The Death of the Virgin (Louvre). Rubens was after his return to Antwerp instrumental in the acquisition of Caravaggio's Madonna of the Rosary (Kunsthistorisches Museum, Vienna) for the St. Paul's Church in Antwerp. During his stay in Italy Rubens broadened his interest in Caravaggio’s work to include the 1606 Supper at Emmaus in Milan (Pinacoteca di Brera) and the 1600 The Calling of St Matthew as well as the more recent work in the Santa Maria in Vallicella and the Basilica of Sant'Agostino. Although some of this interest in Caravaggio is reflected in his drawings during his Italian residence, it was only after his return to Antwerp in 1608 that his works show openly Caravaggesque traits such as in the Cain slaying Abel (1608–1609) (Courtauld Institute of Art). However, the influence of Caravaggio on Rubens’ work would be less important than that of Raphael, Correggio, Barocci and the Venetians. Artists, who were influenced by Rubens, such as Pieter van Mol, Gaspar de Crayer and Willem Jacob Herreyns, also used certain stark realism and strong contrasts of light and shadow, common to Caravaggisti style.

Rubens' contemporary Abraham Janssens was another Flemish painter who travelled to Italy (from 1597 to 1602) where he became acquainted with the work of Caravaggio. His work after his return to Antwerp shows the influence of Caravaggio. The composition Scaldis and Antwerpia of 1609 derives its expressive power from the use of strong contrasts of light and shadow (chiaroscuro) as was pioneered by Caravaggio.

It is mainly the Flemish artists from the generation after Rubens coming on the art scene in the 1620s who were most influenced by Caravaggio. It can even be said that there was a Caravaggist craze in Flanders from about 1620 to 1640. The artists are often referred to as the Ghent Caravaggisti and the Antwerp Caravaggisti after the city in which they were principally active. There is, however, no discernible stylistic distinction between these two movements other than individual ones. Among the Ghent Caravaggisti can be listed Jan Janssens, Melchior de la Mars and Antoon van den Heuvel. The list of Antwerp Caravaggisti is significantly longer reflecting the importance of this city as the pre-eminent artistic centre of Flanders. They include Theodoor Rombouts, Gerard Seghers, Jan Cossiers, Adam de Coster, Jacques de l'Ange and Jan van Dalen. In Bruges, Jacob van Oost painted genre and history paintings showing the influence of the work of Caravaggio and Manfredi whose work he had studied in Rome. Some Flemish Caravaggisti left their homeland for Italy where they were influenced by the work of Caravaggio and his followers and never returned home. This is the case of Louis Finson of Bruges who after stays in Naples and Rome spent most of his career in France. Another example of an expatriate Flemish Caravaggist is Hendrick de Somer of Lokeren or Lochristi who spent most of his life and career in Naples where he painted in a Caraviggist style influenced by the Spanish painter Jusepe de Ribera.

What most of these artists shared in common is that they likely visited Italy where they had first-hand contact with the work of Caravaggio or his Italian and Dutch followers. The influence of Caravaggio and his followers on their work can be seen in the use of dramatic light effects and expressive gestures as well as the new subject matter such as card sharps, fortune tellers, the denial of St Peter, etc. Some of the artists focused on certain aspects of Caravaggio's oeuvre. For instance, Adam de Coster was referred to as the Pictor Noctium (painter of the nights) because of his preference for the use of stark chiaroscuro and the repeated motif of half-length figures illuminated by a candle which is covered.

Many of these artists such as Rombouts, Cossiers and Seghers later abandoned their strict adherence to the Caravaggist style and subject matter and struck out in different directions often under the influence of the older generation of Flemish artists who had such a dominant influence on Flemish art in the 17th century, i.e. Rubens and van Dyck.

Selected works

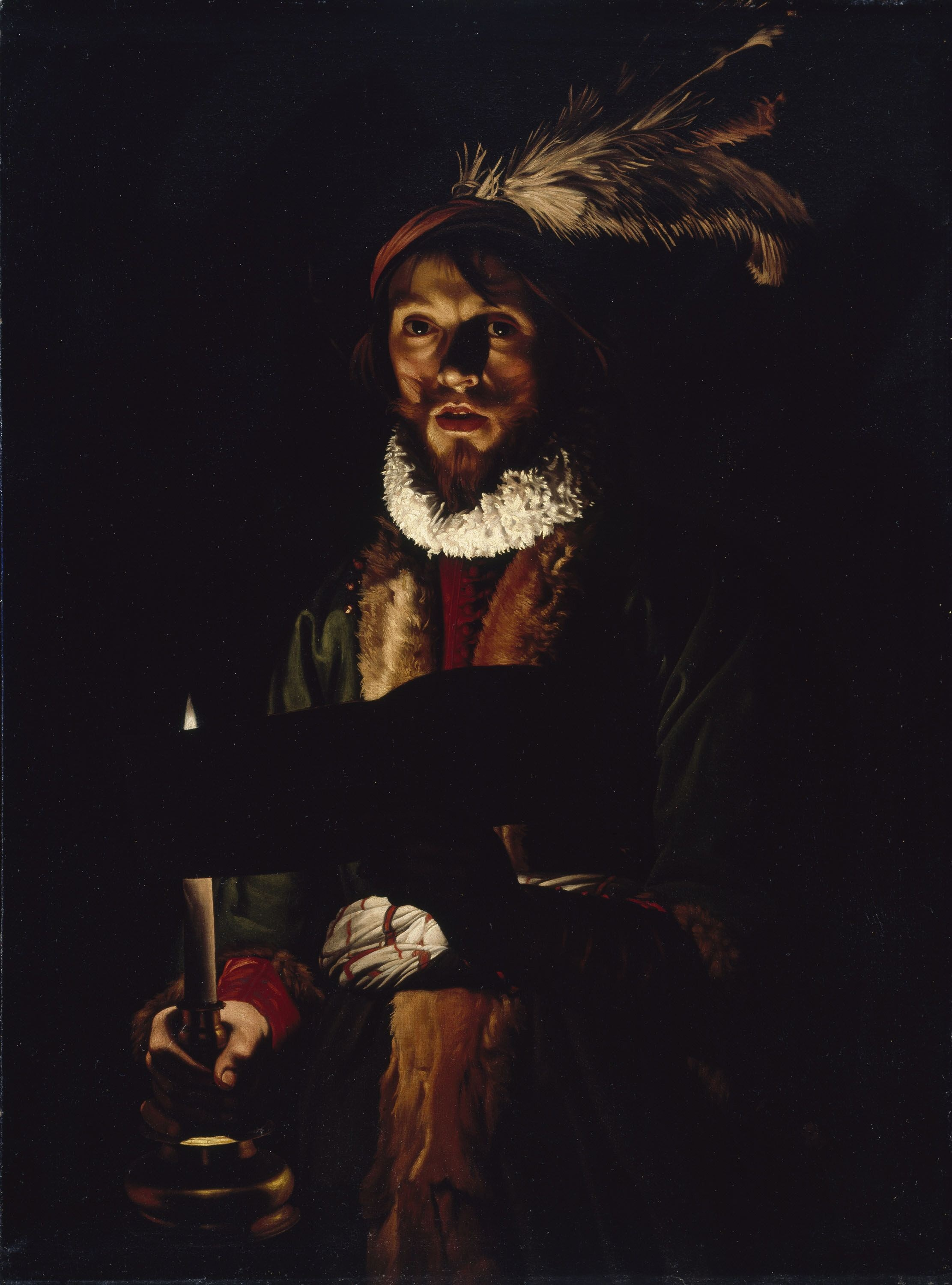
De Coster – A Man Singing by Candlelight, 1620

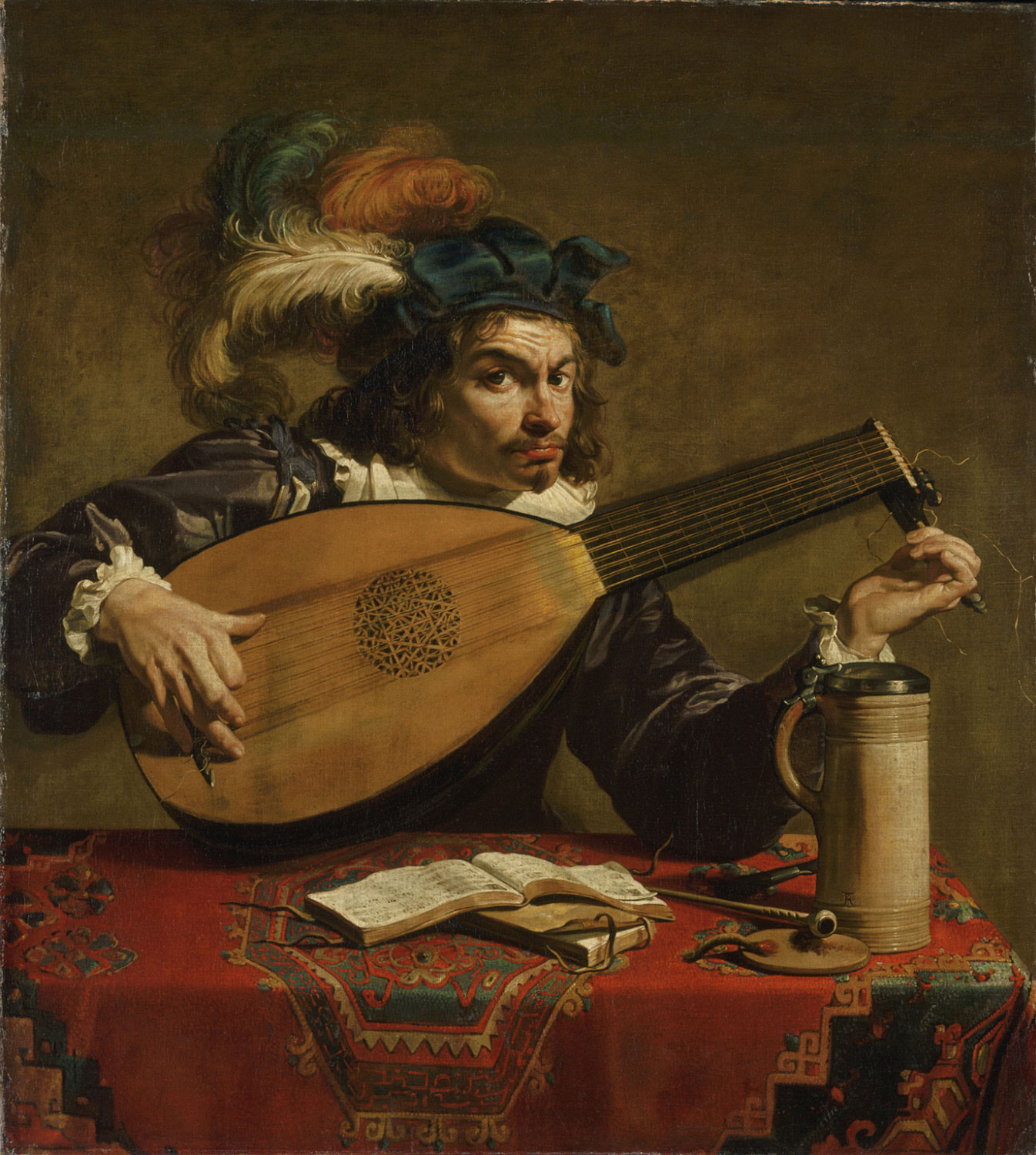
Rombouts – The Lute player, 1620

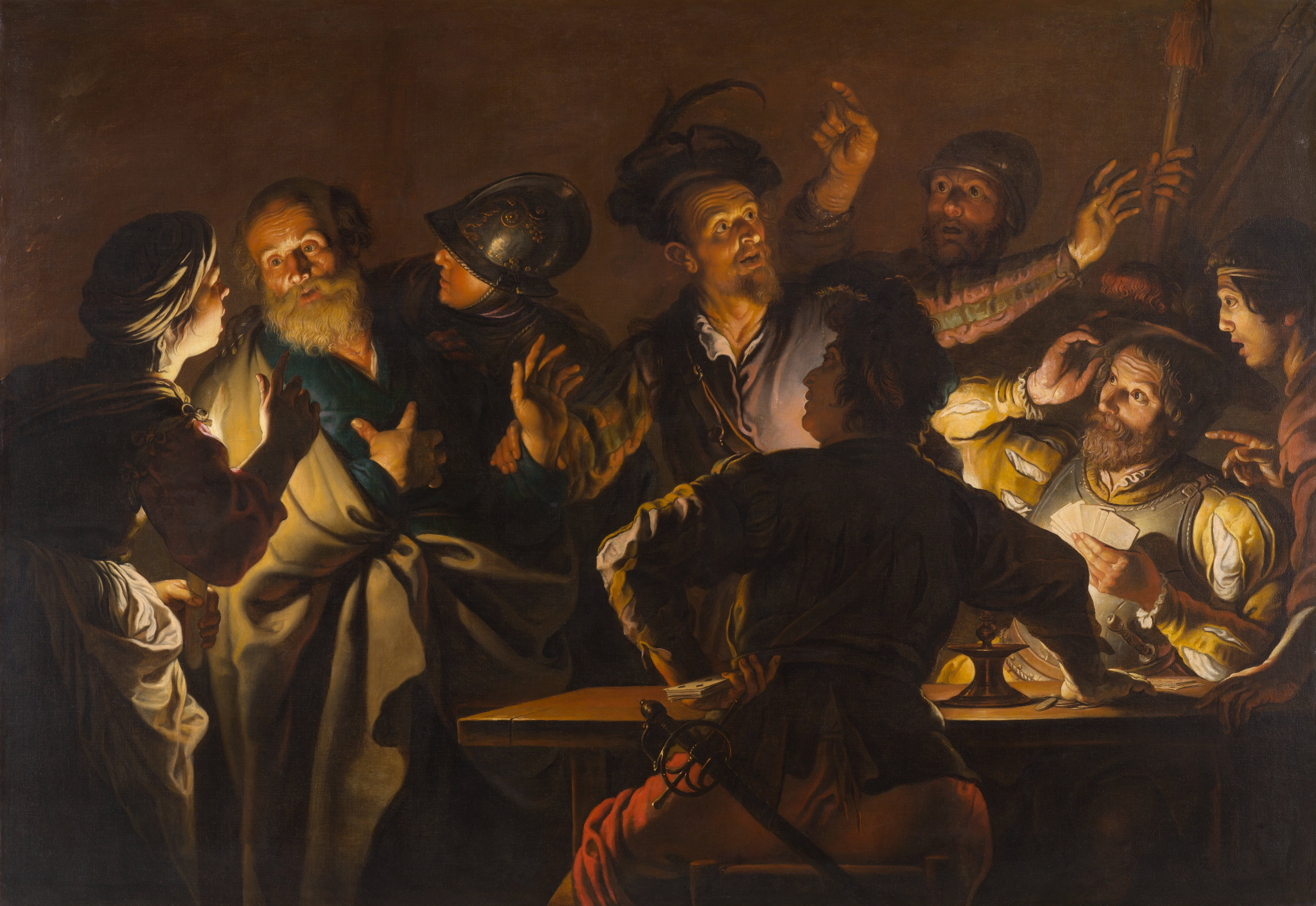
Seghers – The Denial of St. Peter, c. 1623

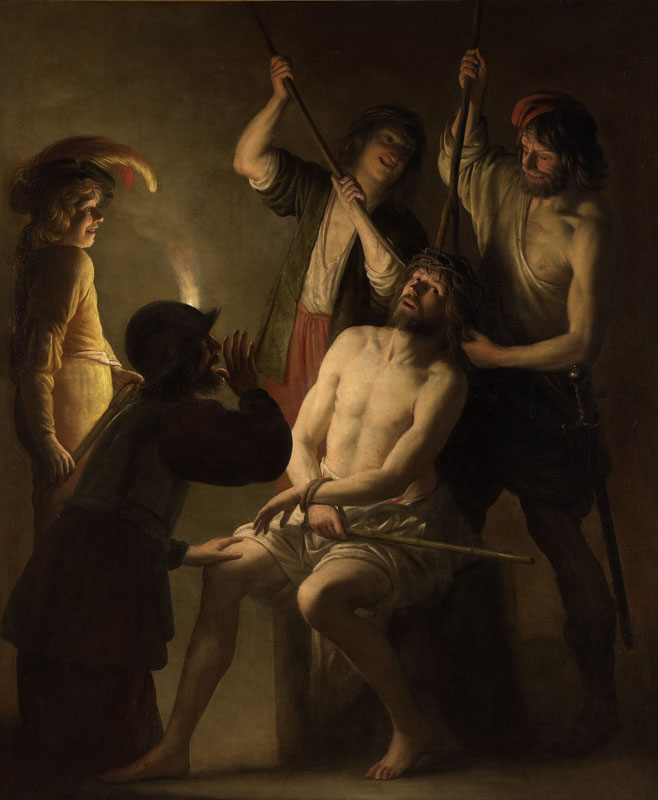
Jan Janssens – The Crowning with Thorns, c. 1648–1650

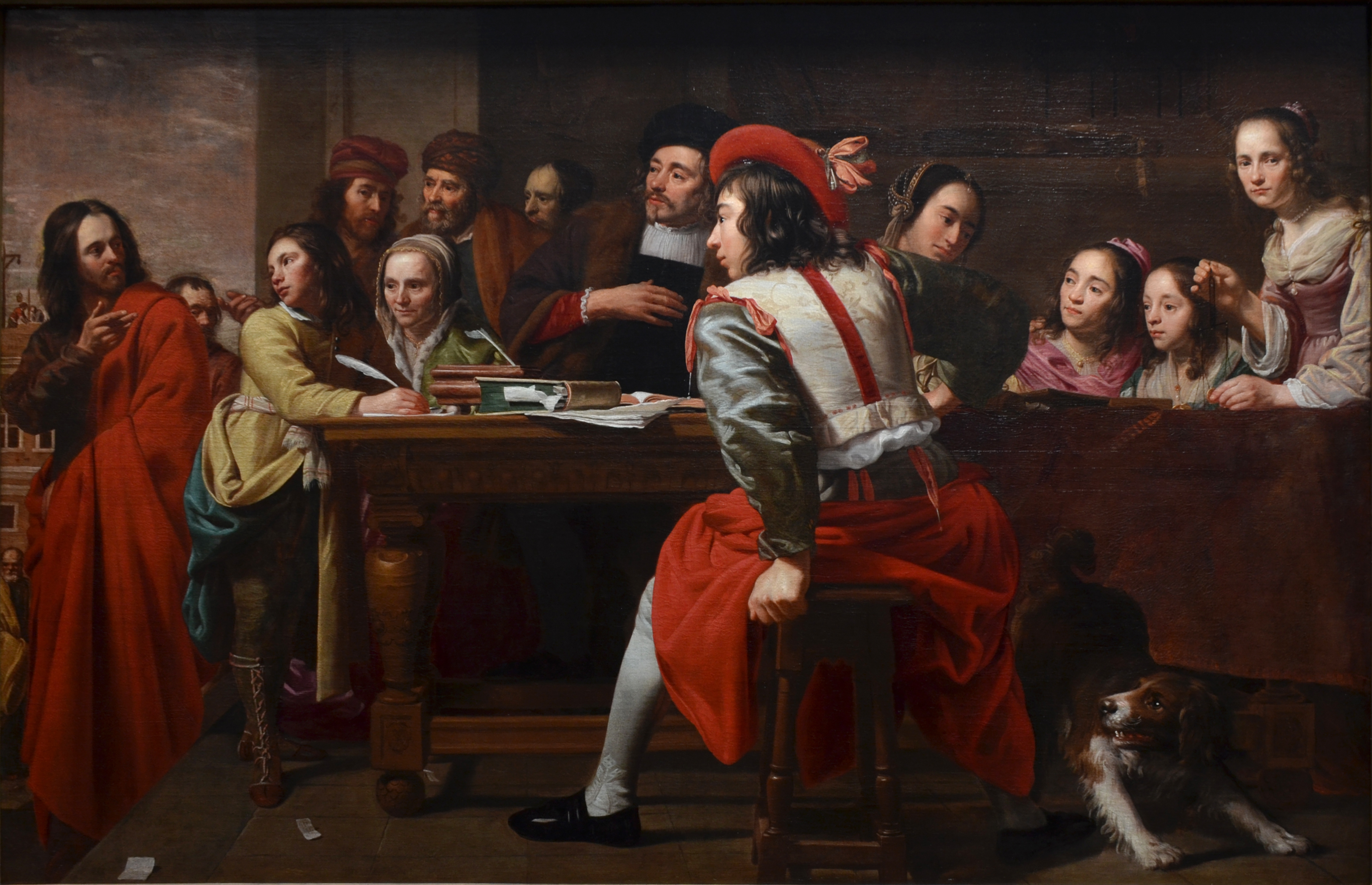
Van Oost, The calling of St. Matthew, 1641

== Dutch ==
In the first three decades of the 17th century, some Catholic artists from the city of Utrecht in the Dutch Republic travelled to Rome where they were profoundly influenced by the work of Caravaggio and his followers. The first of these artists to arrive was Hendrick ter Brugghen (first recorded in Italy in 1607) followed later by Gerrit van Honthorst, Dirck van Baburen and Jan van Bijlert. On their return to Utrecht, their Caravaggesque works inspired a short-lived but influential flowering of artworks inspired indirectly in style and subject matter by the works of Caravaggio and the Italian followers of Caravaggio. This style or school of painting was later referred to as Utrecht Caravaggism. The brief flourishing of Utrecht Caravaggism ended around 1630, when major artists had either died, as in the case of van Baburen and Terbrugghen, or had changed style, like van Honthorst's shift to portraiture and history scenes informed by the Flemish tendencies popularized by Rubens and his followers. In the following generation the effects of Caravaggio, although attenuated, are to be seen in the work of Vermeer, Rembrandt, and Gerrit Dou's "niche paintings".

Selected works

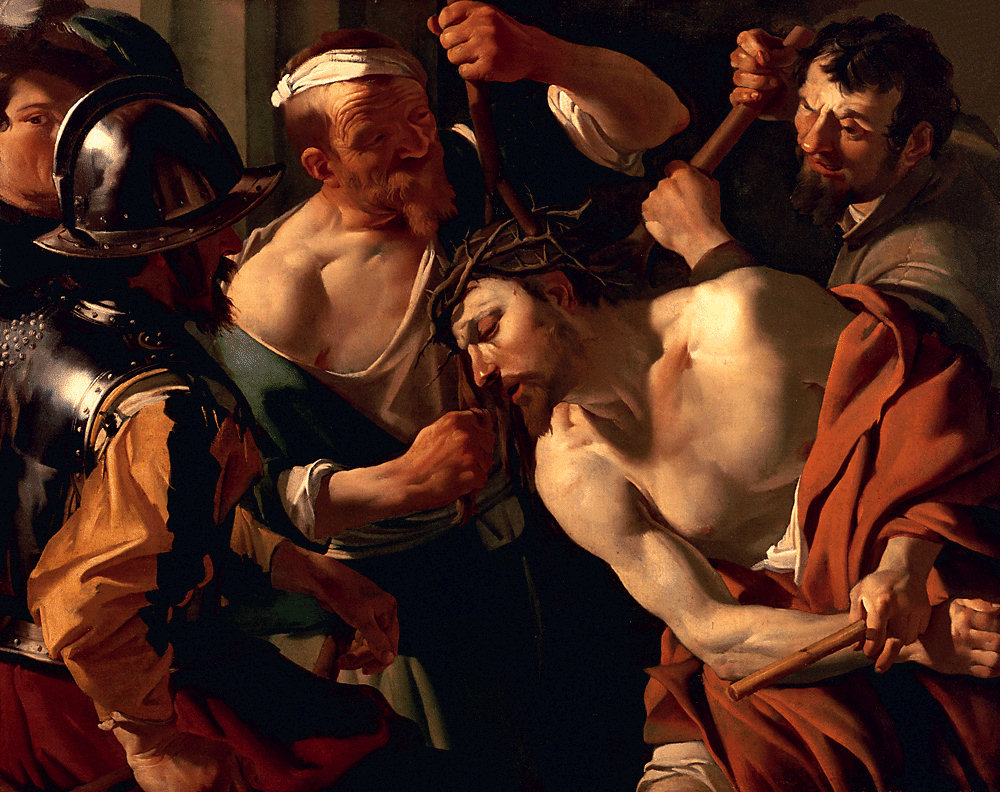
Van Baburen – Christ with the crown of thorns, 1623

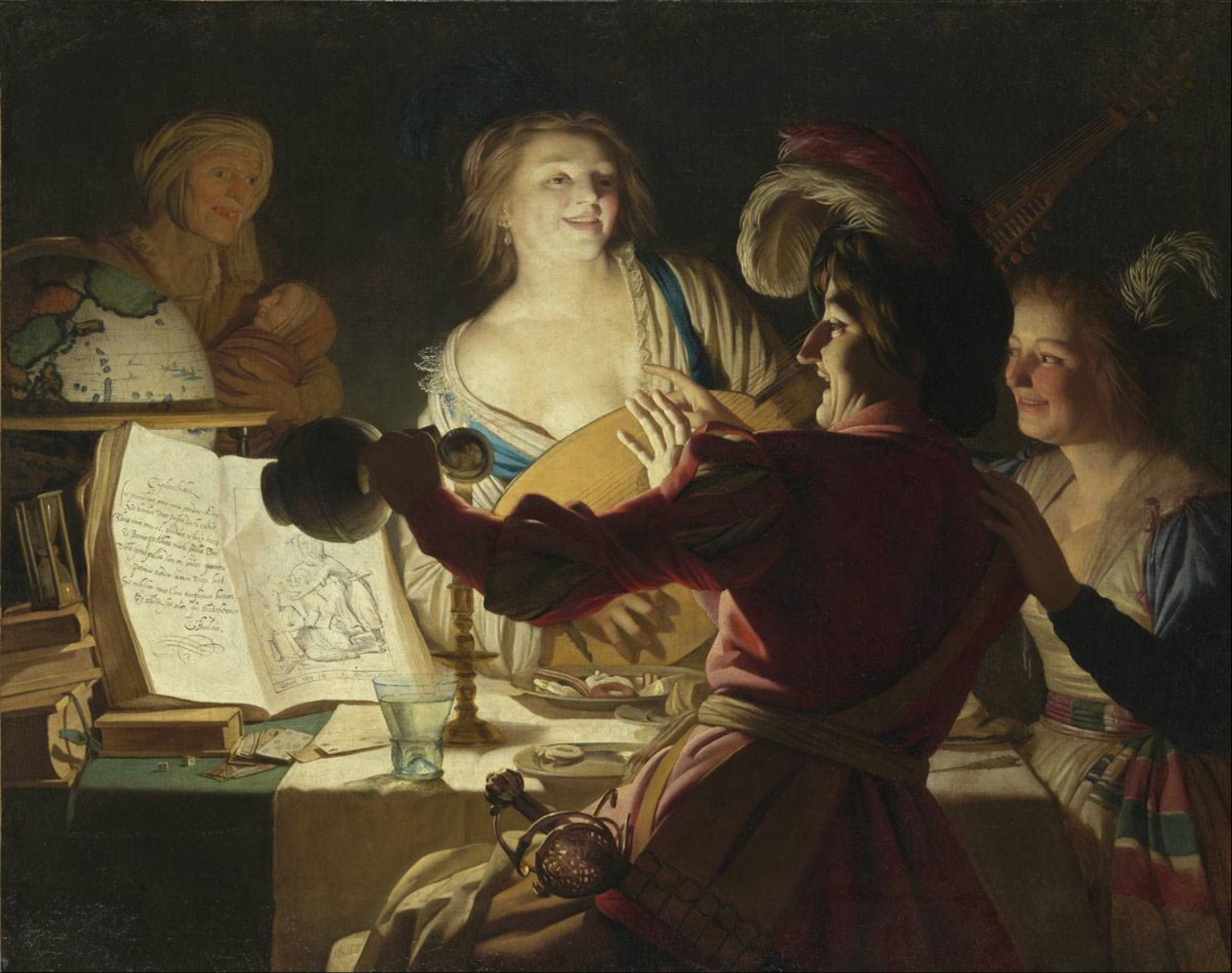
Van Honthorst – Merry Company, 1623

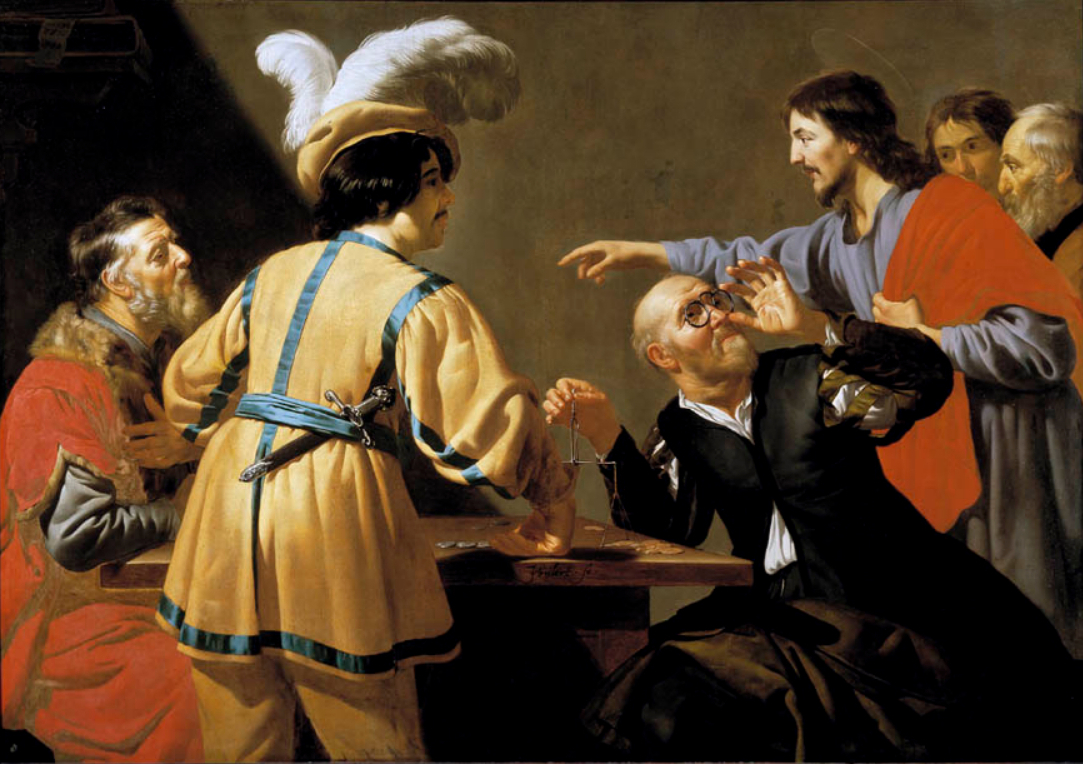
Van Bijlert – The calling of St. Matthew, 1625-1630

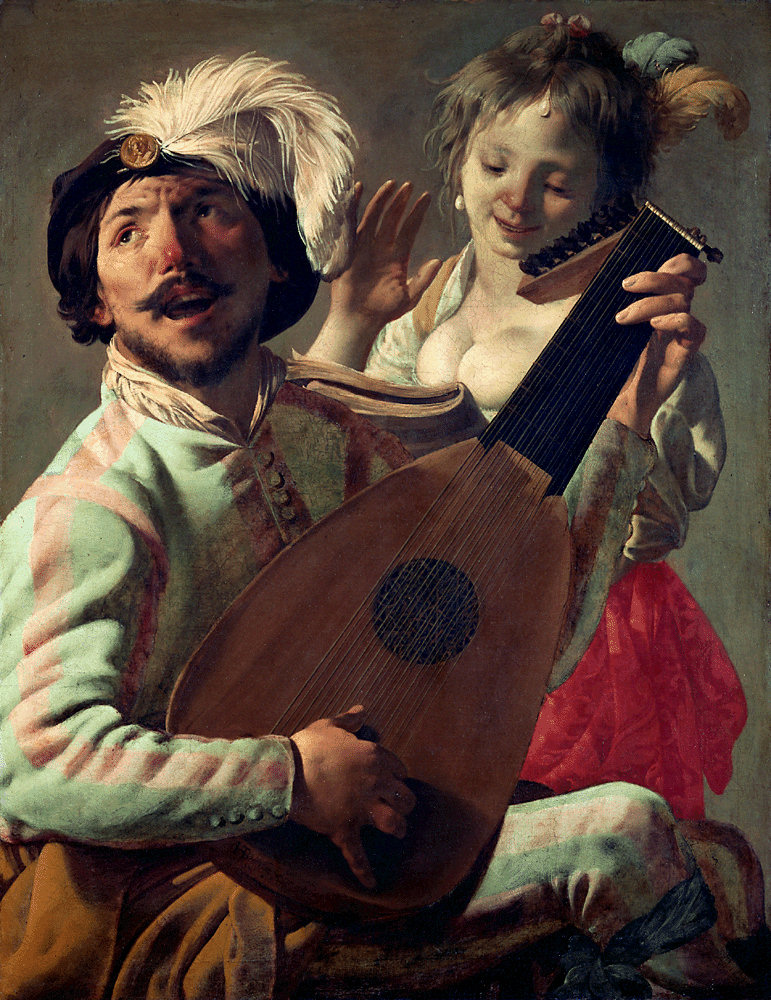
Ter Brugghen – The Duet, 1628

== French ==
One of the first French artists to studio in Rome during the Caravaggio Years was Jean LeClerc, who studied under Saraceni during the early 17th century. Simon Vouet spent an extensive period of time in Italy, from 1613 to 1627. His patrons included the Barberini family, Cassiano dal Pozzo, Paolo Giordano Orsini and Vincenzo Giustiniani. He also visited other parts of Italy: Venice; Bologna, (where the Carracci family had their academy); Genoa, (where from 1620 to 1622, he worked for the Doria princes); and Naples. He absorbed what he saw and distilled it in his painting: Caravaggio's dramatic lighting; Italian Mannerism; Paolo Veronese's color and di sotto in su or foreshortened perspective; and the art of Carracci, Guercino, Lanfranco and Guido Reni. Vouet's success in Rome led to his election as president of the Accademia di San Luca in 1624. Despite his success in Rome, Vouet returned to France in 1627. Vouet's new style was distinctly Italian, importing the Italian Baroque style into France. Other French artists enamored by the new style included Valentin de Boulogne, who was living in Rome by 1620, and studied under Vouet and later Boulognes pupil Nicolas Tournier.

Georges de La Tour is assumed to have travelled either to Italy or the Netherlands early in his career. His paintings reflect the influence of Caravaggio, but this probably reached him through the Dutch Caravaggisti and other Northern (French and Dutch) contemporaries. In particular, La Tour is often compared to the Dutchman Hendrick Terbrugghen. Louis Finson, also known as Ludovicus Finsonius, was a Flemish Baroque painter, who also worked in France.

Selected works

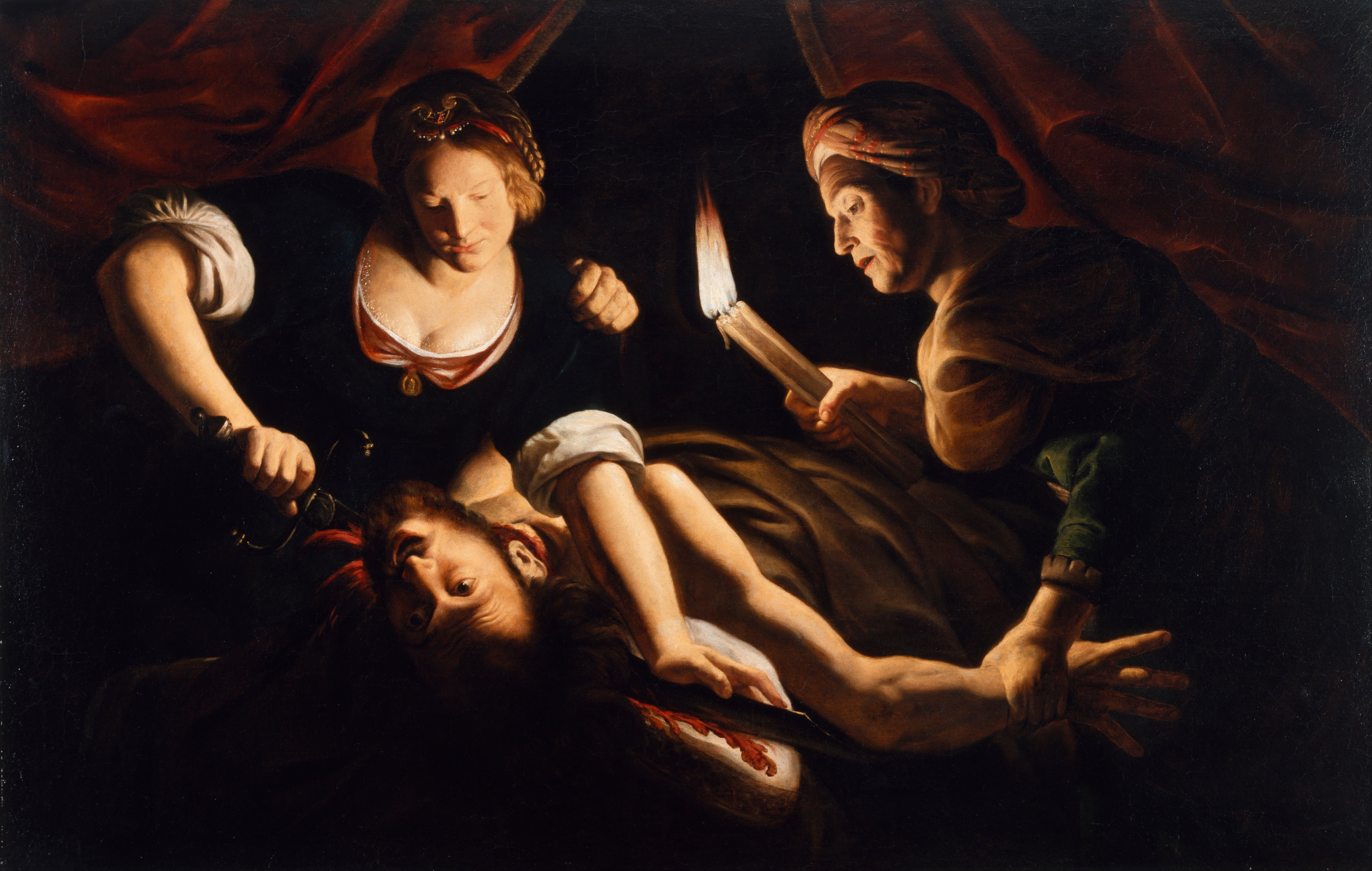
Bigot – Judith and Holofernes

Boulogne – The Cheats, 1618–1620

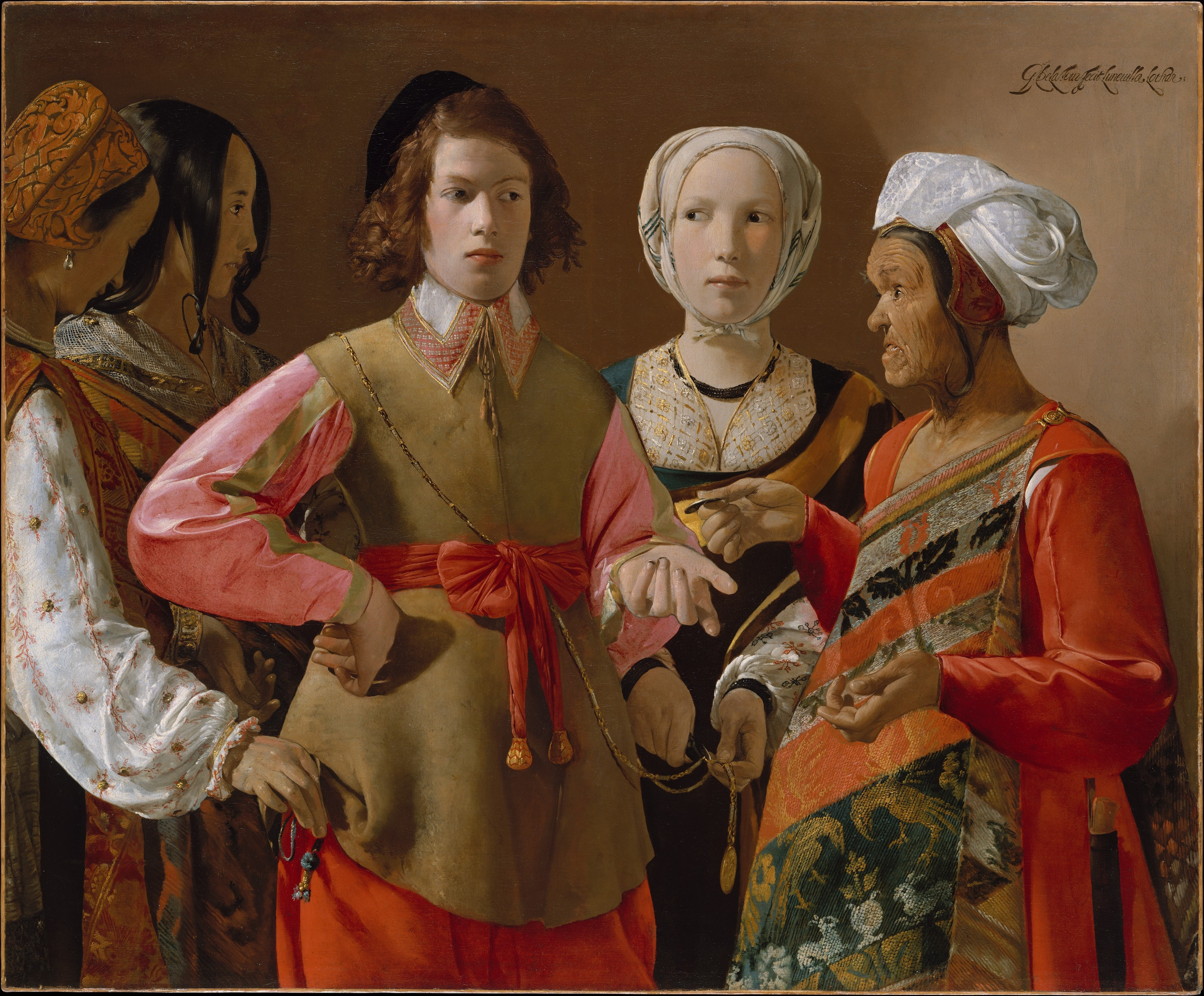
La Tour – The Fortune Teller, 1630

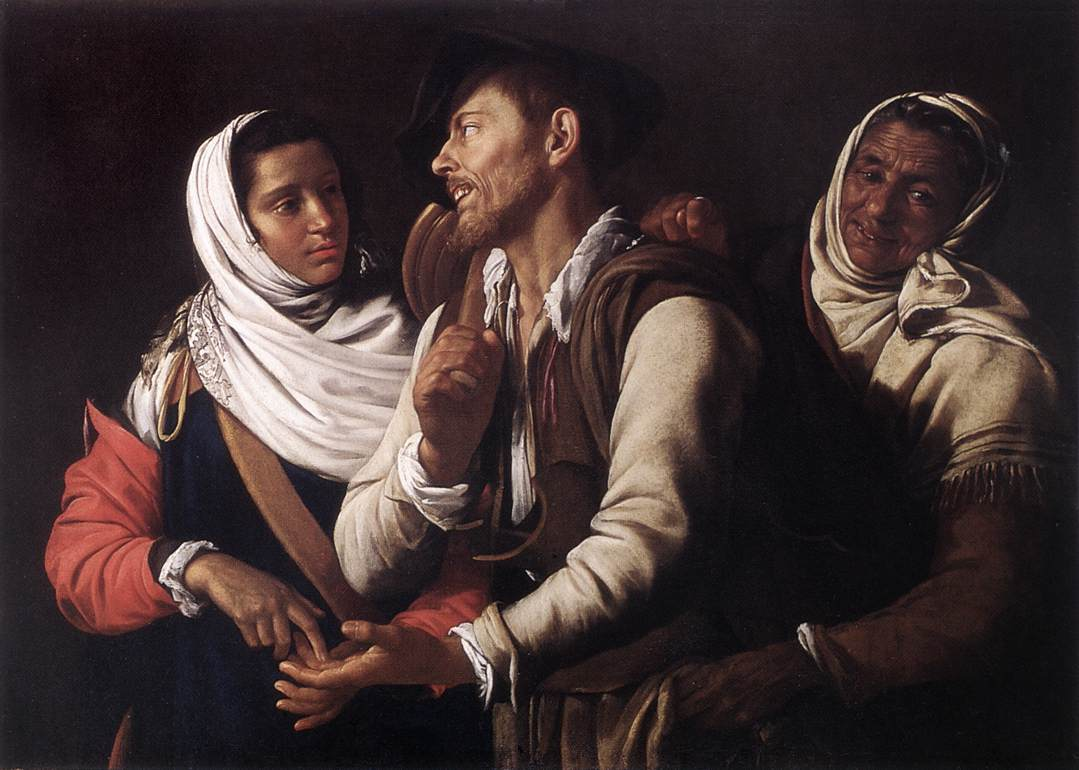
Vouet – The Fortune Teller, 1617

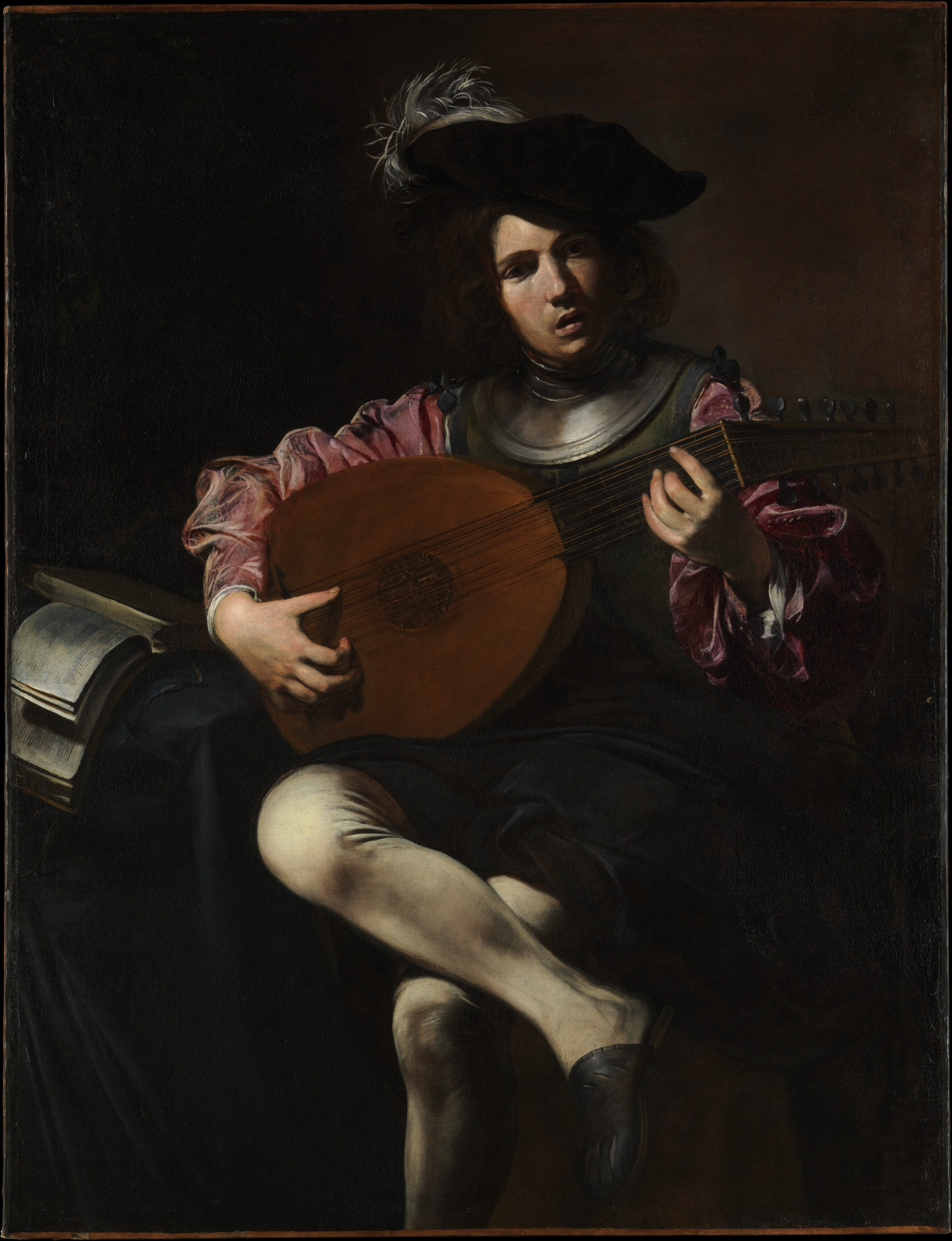
de Boulogne – Lute Player, 1626

== Spanish ==
Francisco Ribalta became among the first followers in Spain of the tenebrist style. It is unclear if he directly visited either Rome or Naples, where Caravaggio's style had many adherents, although through its Naples connection Spain was probably already exposed to Caravaggisim by the early 17th century. His son Juan Ribalta, Vicente Castelló and Jusepe de Ribera are said to have been his pupils, although it is entirely possible that Ribera acquired his tenebrism when he moved to Italy. The style garnered a number of adherents in Spain, and was to influence the Baroque or Golden Age Spanish painters, especially Zurbarán, Velázquez and Murillo. Even the art of still life in Spain, the bodegón was often painted in a similar stark and austere style. Orazio Borgianni signed a petition to begin an Italianate academy of painting in Spain and executed a series of nine paintings for the Convento de Portacoeli, Valladolid, where they remain. Giovanni Battista Crescenzi was an Italian painter and architect of the early-Baroque period, active in Rome and Spain, where he helped decorate the pantheon of the Spanish kings at El Escorial. He rose to prominence as an artist during the reign of Pope Paul V, but by 1617 had moved to Madrid, and from 1620 on, he was active in El Escorial. Philip III of Spain awarded him the title of Marchese de la Torre, Knight of Santiago. His pupil Bartolomeo Cavarozzi was active in Spain 1617–19.

Selected works

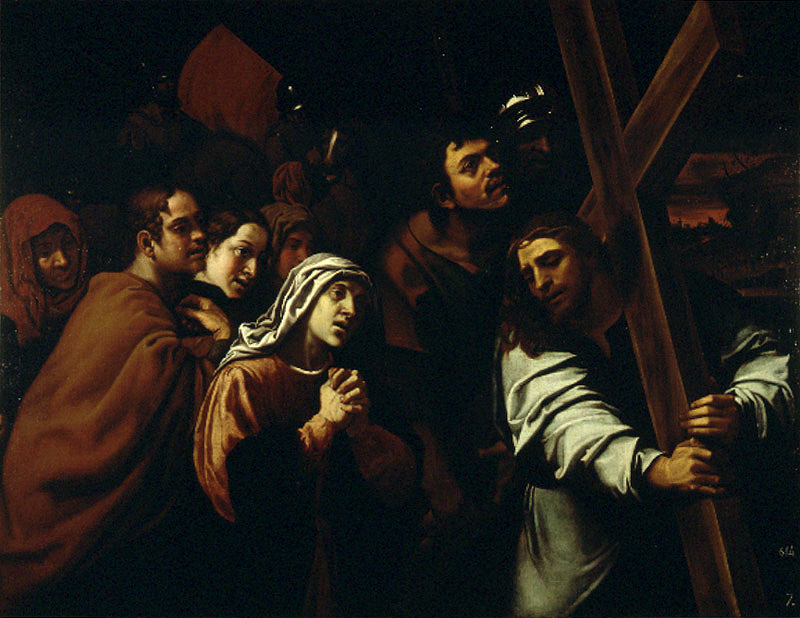
Ribalta – Christ with the Cross, 1612

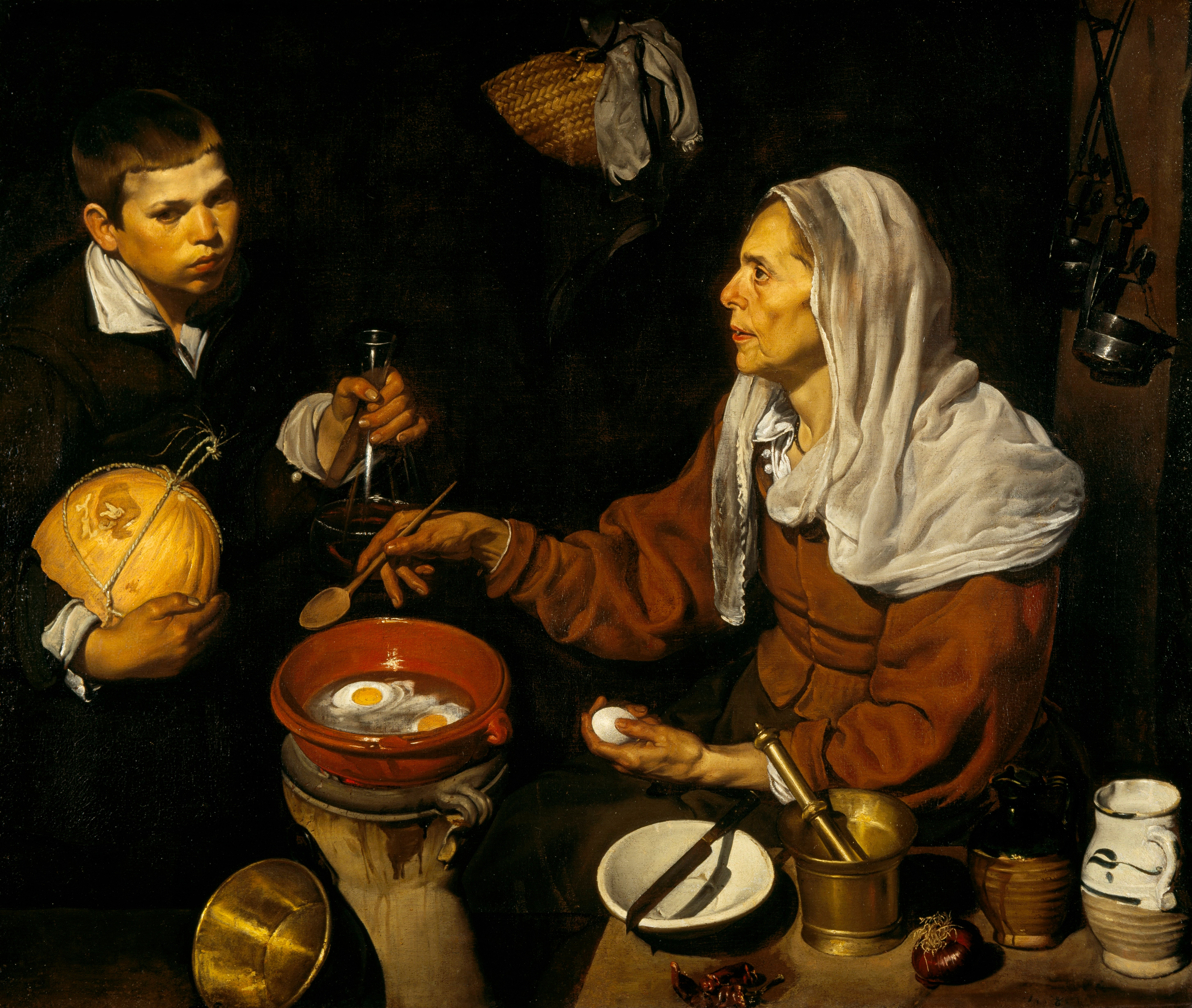
Velázquez – Old Woman Frying Eggs (The Old Cook), 1618

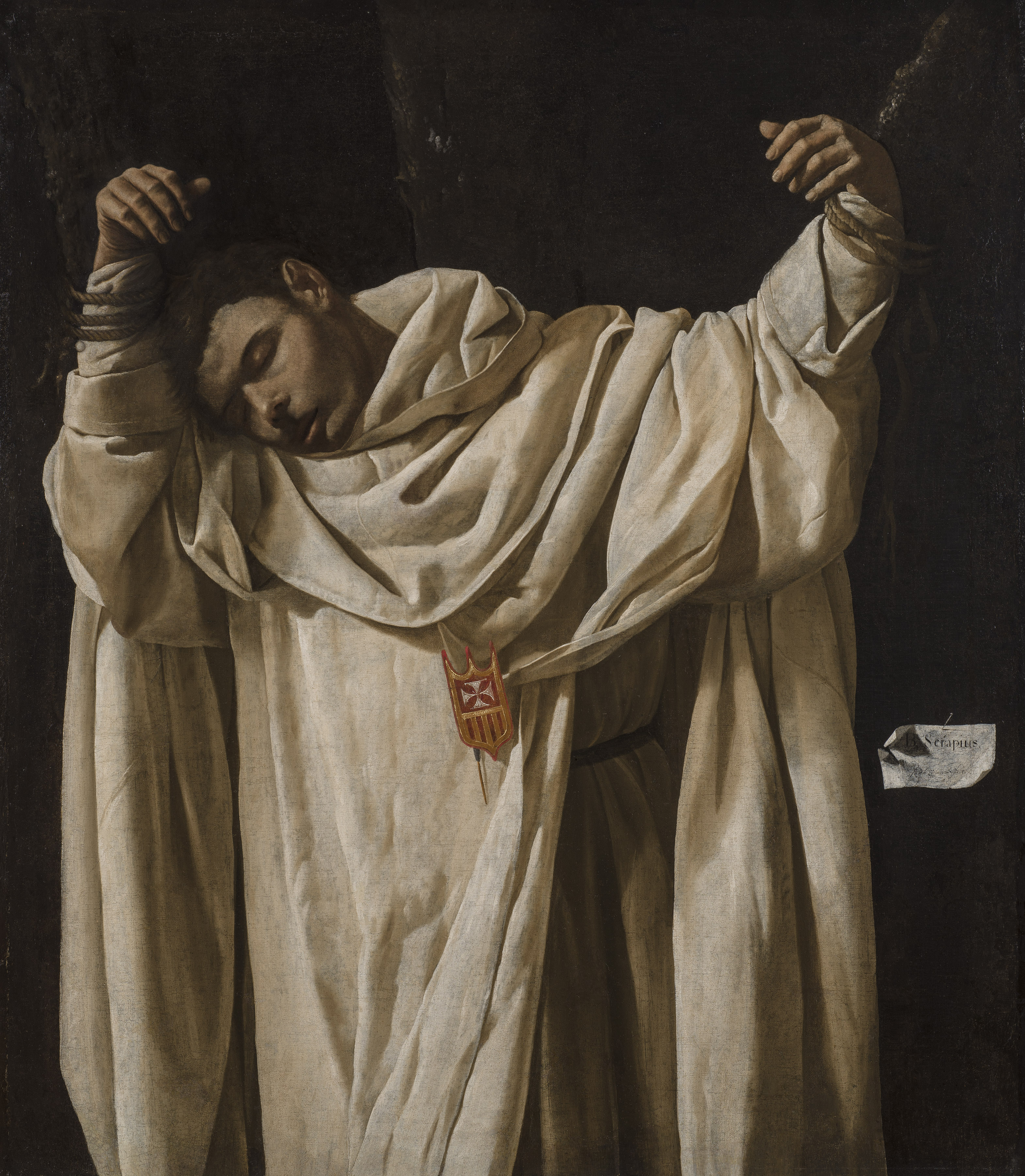
Zurbarán – The Martyrdom of Saint Serapion, 1628

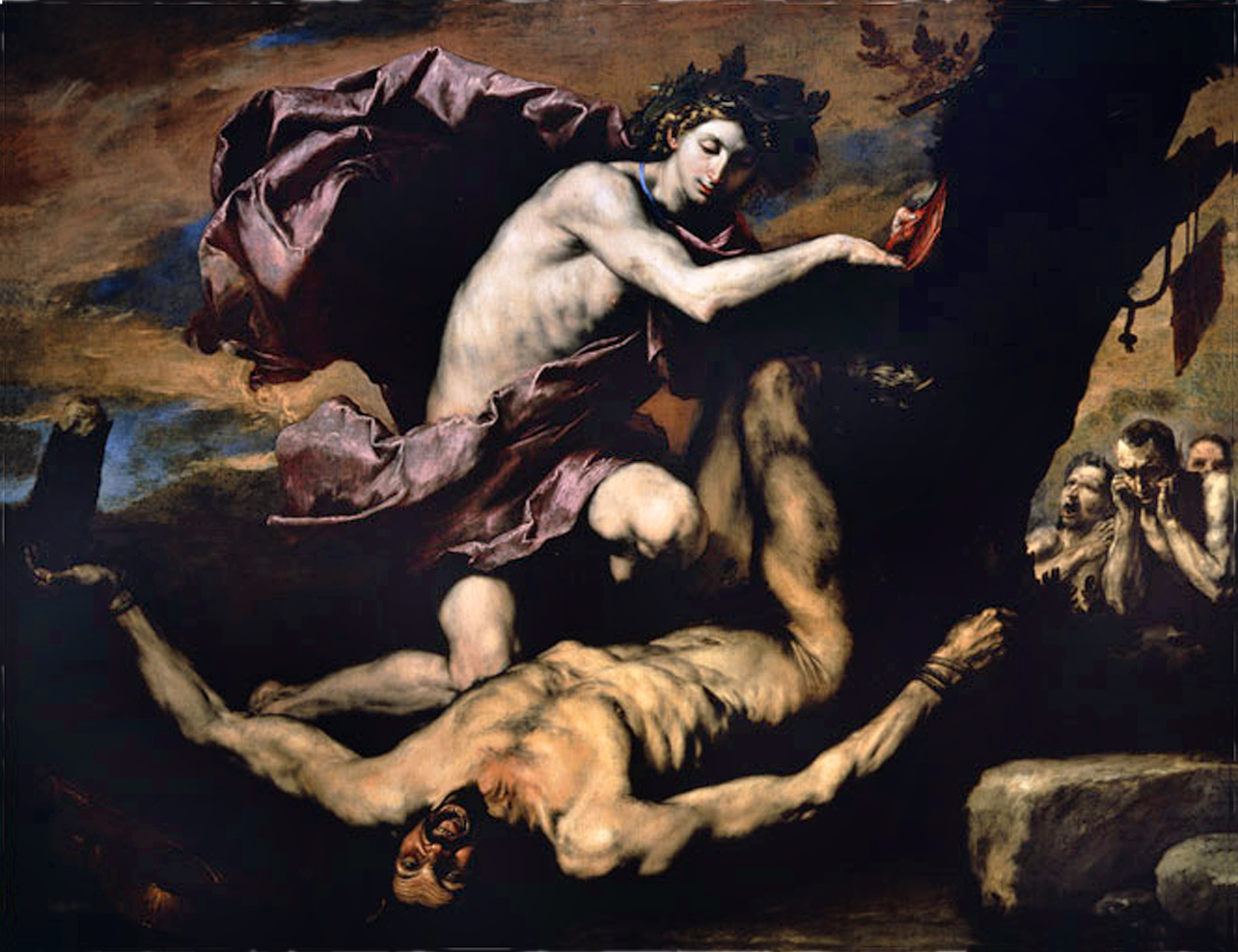
Ribera - Apollo and Marsyas, 1637

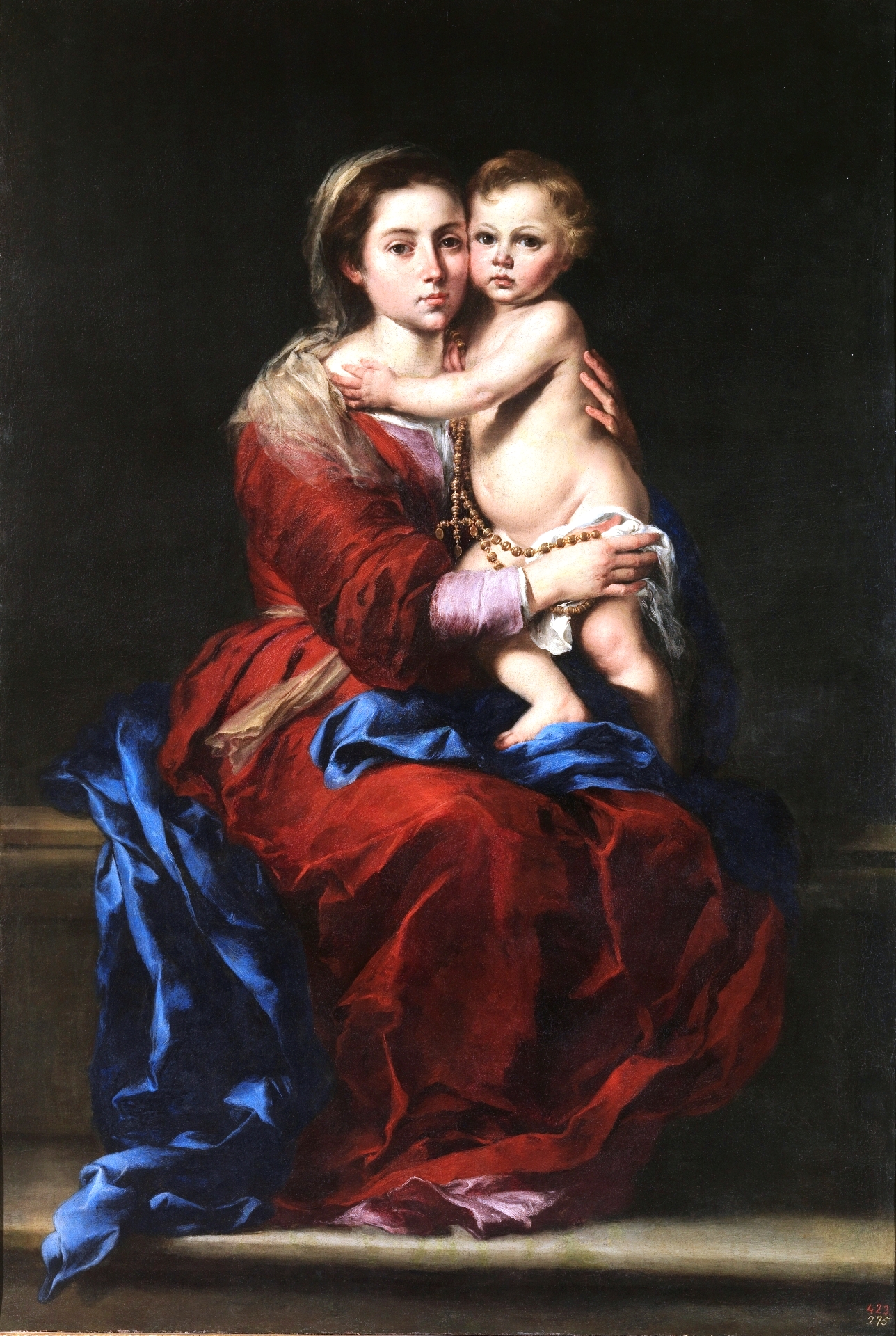
Murillo - The Virgin of the Rosary, c. 1650–1655

== See also ==
- Caravaggio
- Paintings from the Contarelli chapel
