= Master of the Gamblers =

Italian painter

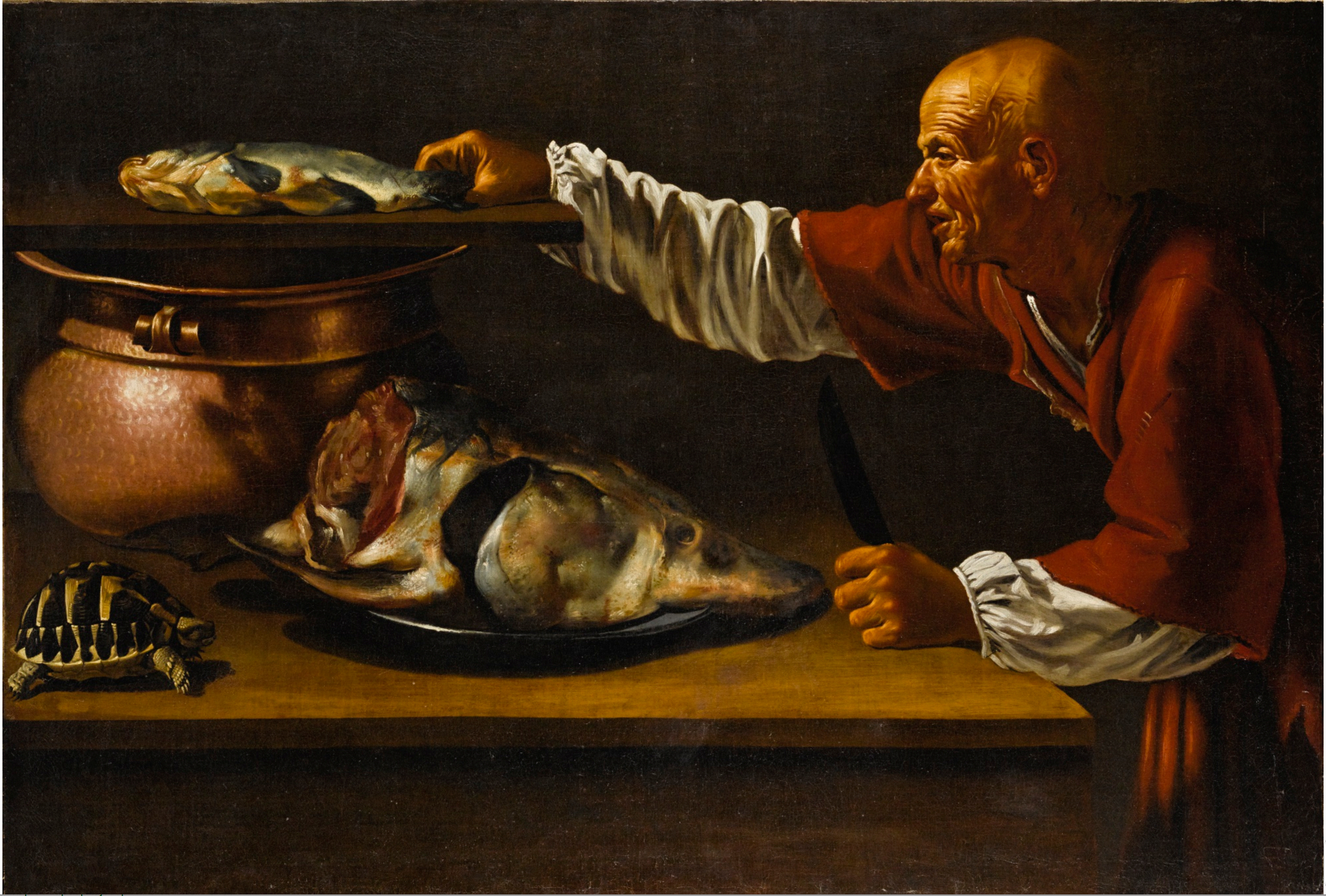
A kitchen interior with a sturgeon, a turtle, and the figure of an old man in red, c. 1620s

The Master of the Gamblers (known in Italian as Maestro dei Giocatori) (fl 1620 – 1640) is the notname given to a painter active in Rome and possibly also in Naples in the second and third decade of the 17th century, whose subject matter and style rank him among the Caravaggisti (followers of Michelangelo Merisi da Caravaggio). The artist depicted genre subjects and still life elements in his works in a stark naturalist manner. The identity and nationality of the artist are not known. Art historians have yet to arrive at a unanimous view on the nationality, work location and the oeuvre of the artist. He may have been Italian, but a northern European background has also been proposed.

== Discovery and identification of the artist ==
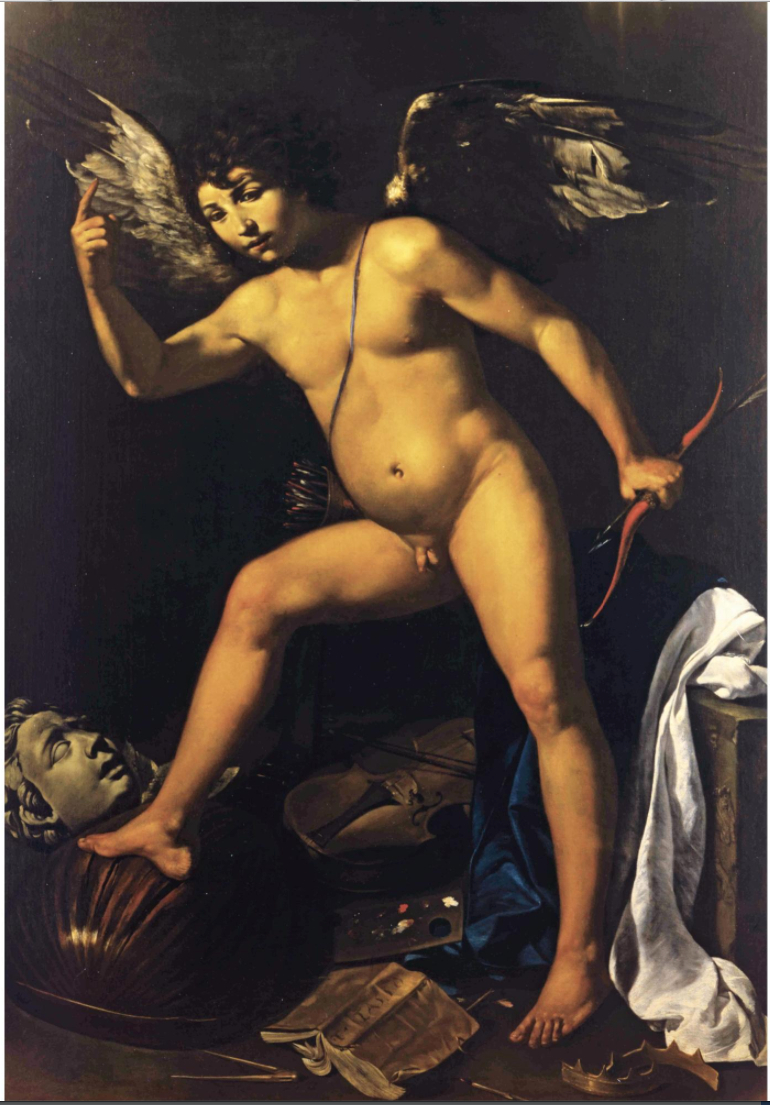
Omnia vincit amor, c. 1620s

The Italian art historian Gianni Papi coined the notname of the artist after he identified a number of paintings in a Caravaggist style as being by the same hand. In a number of articles on the artist published starting from 1998 Papi has grouped a total of 25 works, which he ascribed to the artist. These paintings mainly depict scenes with gamblers, dice players and sellers of food. It this thematic link, which formed the principal reason for grouping them together as by the same artist. The notname Master of the Gamblers was chosen because the first paintings given to the artist depicted players of cards and dice.

Papi regards the artist as an Italian who was influenced by Caravaggio and close followers of Caravaggio such as José de Ribera, Cecco del Caravaggio and Tommaso Salini. Other art historians have described the characteristics of the style of the artist as situated between the Italian Bartolomeo Manfredi and the Flemish artist Theodoor Rombouts. They therefore believe the artist to be a Flemish or Dutch follower of Caravaggio. Other scholars see similarities with the work of French Caravaggio follower Valentin de Boulogne and therefore believe the artist to be French.

The work location of the artist has also been the subject of dispute. While most scholars place the artist in Rome in the 1620s and 1630s some believe he worked in Naples.

== Work ==
About 25 works have been attributed to the artist. The majority of the work of the artist deals with genre subjects of a picaresque nature such as gamblers including dice players; card players and morra players, musicians, sellers of fruit and vegetables and kitchen scenes, which were the type of low life scenes typically treated by Caravaggio and his followers. Another subject he depicted is The incredulity of St Thomas (At Sotheby's on 14–15 June 2011, Milan, lot 22 as 'Caravaggesque school'), also a theme treated by Caravaggio. An exception is the Omnia vincit amor (At Sotheby's London sale on 9 December 2009, lot 31), which shows a victorious Cupid based on a popular quotation from Virgil's Eclogues.

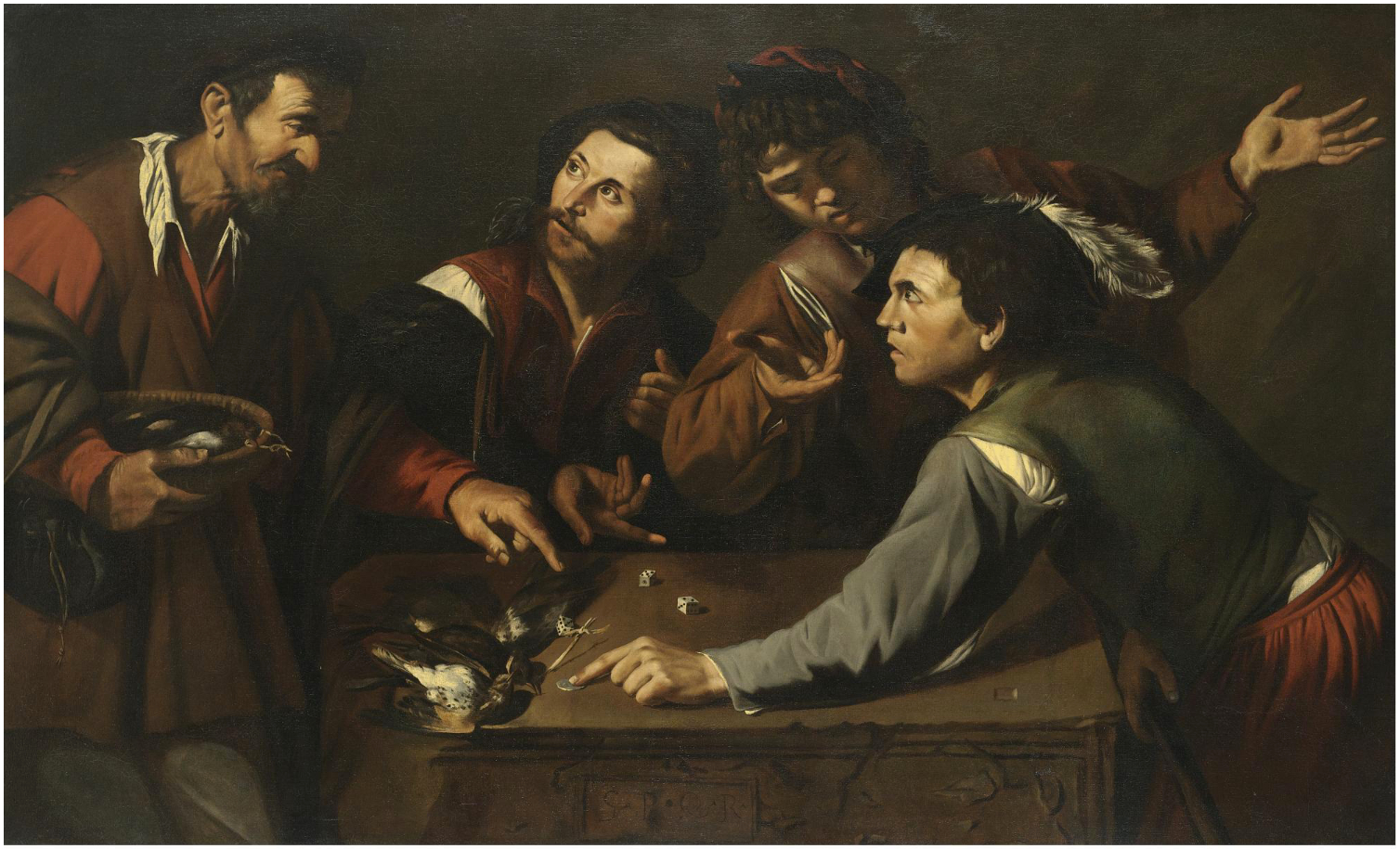
Dice-players and a bird-seller gathered around a stone slab, c. 1620s

The paintings attributed to the Master of the Gamblers are in a style reminiscent of other followers of Caravaggio but in particular of that of the young José de Ribera. The artist's work is close to that of the Caravaggesque painter Pietro Paolini who was also active in Rome around the same time. In the horizontal format and stylistic elements as well as his frequent treatment of musicians and musical instruments his works are reminiscent of Paolini. At the same time, the artist was able to forge his own style, which has made it relatively easy to identify his works. The characteristics of the Master's style are a vigorous, almost brutal, expressionism and naturalism, strong linear and characterful depictions of his figures' faces and gestures, crumbled surfaces and treating objects with a dramatic sculptural quality.

The Master of the Gamblers showed a strong interest in still life painting and many of his pictures with fruit and vegetable sellers give ample space to the still life elements, which are worked out extensively. The still life elements in his works are rendered with a strong naturalism reminiscent of Cecco del Caravaggio.
