= Tommaso Salini =

Italian painter (1575–1625)

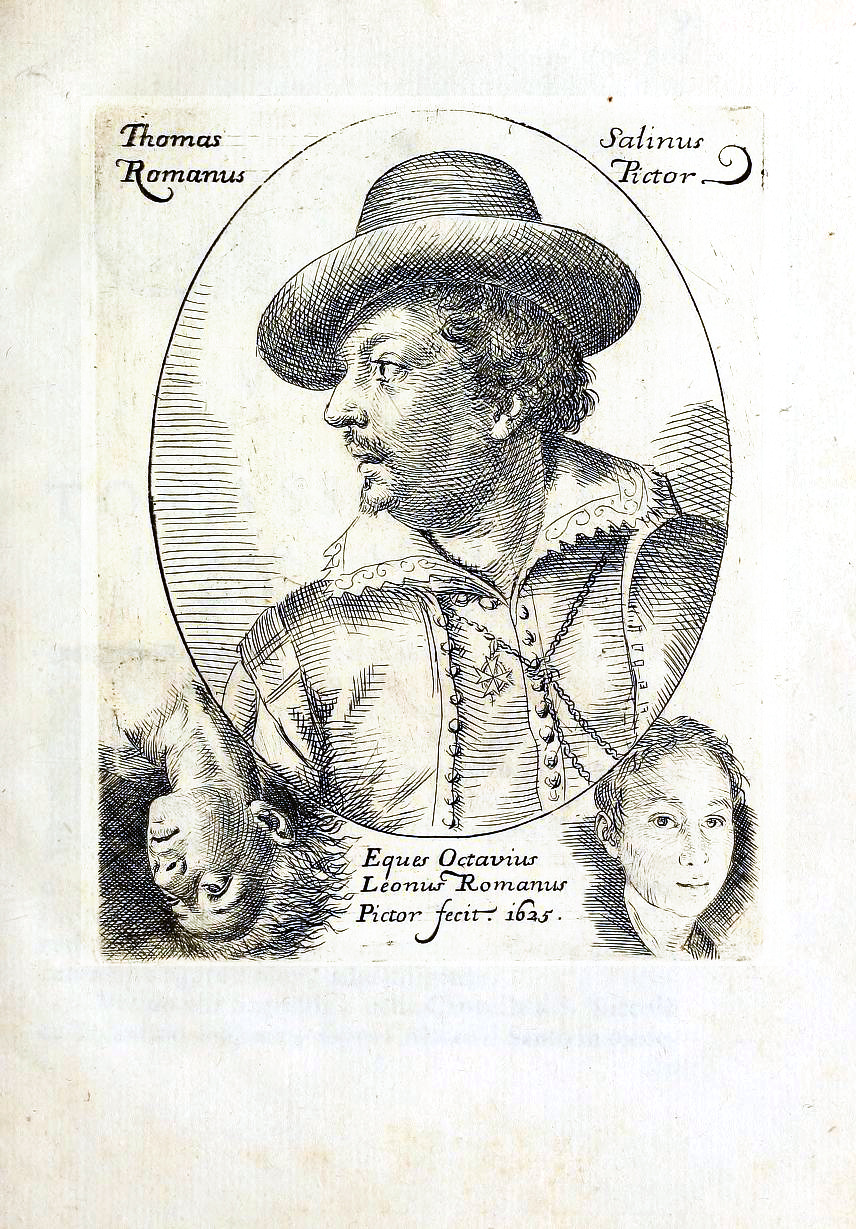

Tommaso Salini (1575 – 13 September 1625), also known as Mao Salini, was an Italian painter of the early-Baroque period, active in Rome. He is best remembered for defending his friend, Giovanni Baglione, in his libel suit against Caravaggio and other painters in his circle. Baglioni describes his still life paintings. He joined the Accademia di San Luca in 1605. Salini is a frequently forgotten Baroque artist who fell under the spell of Caravaggio, despite having a tempestuous relationship with the great painter.

Salini, known as "Mao", was a friend of Giovanni Baglione, the Italian art biographer, who included Salini in his Le vite de’ pittori. Art historians have often shied away from exploring Salini's career because the canvases that have carried his name seem stylistically dissimilar. The recent tendency has been to attribute these works to anonymous Pseudo-Salini painters. In order for Salini's oeuvre to be presented with accuracy, connoisseurs have had to inspect the original works that Baglione mentions as being by Salini's hand, as well as the pictures that have been successfully attributed to him.
