= Nudelman =

Nudelman may refer to:

People:

- Alexander Nudelman (1912–1996), Soviet weapon designer
- Lea Nudelman (born 1955), Israeli chess player
- Michael Nudelman (1938–2019), Israeli politician who served as a member of the Knesset
- Susan Nudelman (known as Suzi Ferrer), (1940–2006) US/Puerto-Rican visual artist and feminist

Weapons:

- Nudelman N-37, a powerful, 37 mm (1.46 in) aircraft cannon used by the Soviet Union
- Nudelman-Rikhter NR-23, a Soviet cannon widely used in military aircraft of the Soviet Union and Warsaw Pact
- Nudelman-Rikhter NR-30, a Soviet cannon widely used in military aircraft of the Soviet Union and Warsaw Pact
- Nudelman-Suranov NS-23, a 23 mm (0.91 in) aircraft cannon
- Nudelman-Suranov NS-37, a 37 mm (1.5 in) aircraft cannon

== See also ==
- Nadelman
