= Thwaytes v Sotheby's =

Art law case

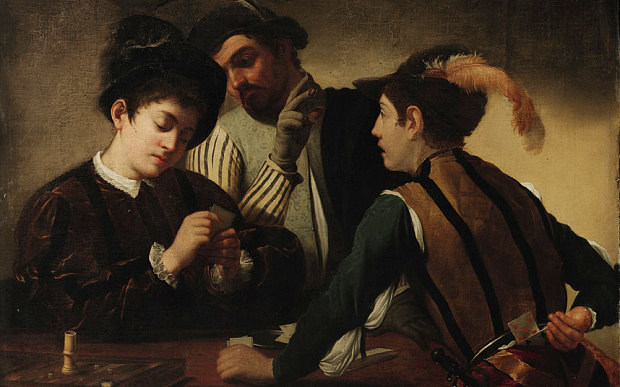
- The alleged copy of Caravaggio's The Cardsharps that was involved in the case
- Court: High Court
- Full case name: Mr Lancelot Thwaytes v Sotheby's
- Decided: 16 January 2015
- Citations: [2016] 1 WLR 2143; [2015] EWHC 36

Case opinions
- Rose J: Luxmoore-May v Messenger applied. Sotheby's discharged its duty of care, which was higher than that of a 'provincial' auction house. Partly because their methods were generally sound and partly because the painting was not an autograph replica by Caravaggio.

Keywords
- Negligence; standard of care; auctioneers' liability

Thwaytes v Sotheby's [2015] EWHC 36 is an English High Court art law case, concerning the liability in negligence and breach of contract of a leading auction house for the professional opinions and valuations they provide where an interested art historian later has a different opinion affecting its value.

This case involved a copy of Caravaggio's The Cardsharps and whether Sotheby's view that it was indeed a copy and not an autograph work by Caravaggio was correct, or at least, reasonable.

The claimant was Lancelot Thwaytes, the seller of the painting and the defendant was Sotheby's, his auctioneer. Thwaytes was represented by Henry Legge KC (of 5 Stone Buildings) and Andrew Bruce (of Serle Court). Sotheby's was represented by Andrew Onslow KC and the late Richard Edwards (both of 3 Verulam Buildings).

The case was heard in 2014 by Rose J (as she then was). She was later elevated to the Court of Appeal and in April 2021 to the Supreme Court.

== Background ==
=== 'Caravaggiomania' ===
Caravaggio (1571–1610) was an Italian Baroque painter who despite, or perhaps because of, his premature death has acquired a great reputation and whose artwork regularly commands high prices; for example, The Denial of Peter, sold in 1997 to the Metropolitan Museum of Art of New York, is rumoured to have been sold for around ten million US dollars (equivalent to £9.7 million in 2021). (Note: Calculated by converting $10 million to GBP at the average 1997 rate of 0.610844 and then inflated using the Bank of England's inflation calculator.) Only 60 paintings are widely acknowledged to have been painted by him, adding scarcity to what Caravaggio scholar Richard E. Spear has called "Caravaggiomania". The popularity for the artist and his works has been expressed by other artists seeking to emulate his style and in other media such as graphic novels, film (both in 1941 and 1986), television, and even a namesake town, train, racehorse and restaurant.

==== The original Cardsharps ====
The Cardsharps is one of Caravaggio's best known works. He painted it around 1595 for his patron, the Cardinal del Monte. The original painting remained with the late Cardinal's collection as it was inherited, separated and sold. In 1895, it was sold to an unknown collector and was lost for just under a century until it reappeared in Zürich, Switzerland, where it was recognised by the Director of the Kimbell Art Museum of Fort Worth, Texas, USA and bought in 1987. Given its subject, a dupe being cheated at a game of cards, it has often served as a tool for political satire, making it a particularly recognisable and popular example of Caravaggio's work.

=== Thwaytes family collection ===
Lancelot Thwaytes, the claimant in this case, inherited his collection from his uncle William Thwaytes, who was a "prolific collector with an evident taste for Caravaggio". In 1947, he bought a painting which would later come to be identified as the lost original of The Musicians. William Thwaytes sold the rediscovered masterpiece to the New York Metropolitan Museum in 1952. He died in 1962, leaving his estate and collection on trust for Lancelot (then aged 4).

== Facts ==
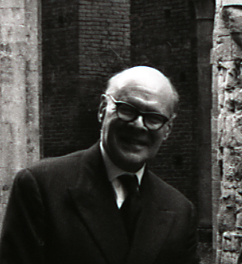
Sir Denis Mahon in 1980

Lancelot Thwaytes sold a copy of Caravaggio's The Cardsharps through Sotheby's on 5 December 2006 for £42,000 after an appraisal by Sotheby's that it was made by a 'follower' of Caravaggio. The purchaser bought the painting for and on behalf of Sir Denis Mahon, an art historian and collector. After having the painting cleaned and conducting 'extensive investigations', Mahon proclaimed it to be an autograph replica of the original painting: that it was painted not by an unnamed artist, but by Caravaggio himself.

Thwaytes then brought two overlapping claims, one for breach of contract and another for negligence. In both he alleged that Sotheby's had been negligent in failing to notice "features that should have indicated to them" that his painting had "Caravaggio potential" and was not a copy.

Simply, Thwaytes argued that Sotheby's had failed to discharge their duty of care towards him in failing to identify his painting was: either by Caravaggio, or that it at least had potential to be by Caravaggio, thus causing him to lose potentially millions of pounds, given that he sold the painting for comparatively little. If authentic, Thwaytes argued, the painting could potentially be "worth up to £50 million".

The case was heard over sixteen days in October and November 2014 by Rose J, as she then was.

== Judgment and issues ==
=== Sotheby's applicable standard of care ===
The parties were in agreement that the standard of care Sotheby's owed Thwaytes under their contract was the same as that which Sotheby's owed him under the general tort of negligence. The exact scope of the applicable standard of care, however, was subject to controversy. Sotheby's argued that it owed Thwaytes no amount of special consideration but merely their "normal" care and diligence, i.e. that which they would owe to any other client.

==== Lack of special circumstances ====
Thwaytes, on the other hand, took the view that there were special circumstances in his case which meant that he was owed a higher standard of care than normal.

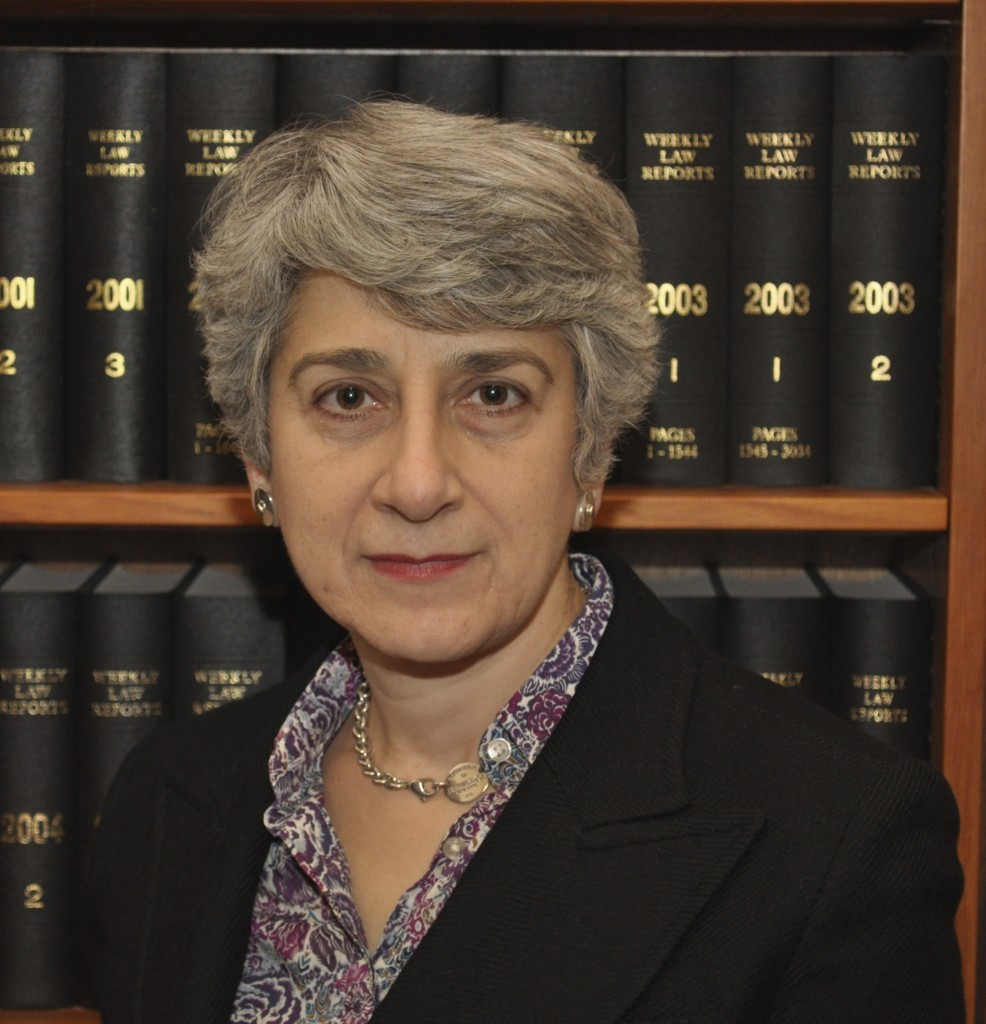
Lady Rose of Colmworth, who heard the case in 2014 while she was known as Rose J

By and large, Rose J dismissed Thwaytes' arguments. In particular, she rejected the idea that, because a painting was consigned to be studied (as Thwaytes did initially) rather than to be sold, a higher standard of care applied. She thought that it would be unfair for an auction house to be held to a higher standard in a situation where they have no certain expectation of obtaining a commission versus one where they can be reasonably certain they will receive one.

Thwaytes also argued that Sotheby's should have been put on notice because the painting came from the same collection as The Musicians. Sotheby's contested this. The judge, while not denying that this could be a relevant factor, held, however, that there was no evidence that Thwaytes' uncle William was a collector noted for his 'eye'. She did accept that Sotheby's reference to him in the 2006 sale catalogue probably piqued Mahon's interest but concluded that, as William Thwaytes had not in fact realised the potential his painting had until it was spotted by two other art historians, Sotheby's had no reason to think that this painting had hidden potential.

Lastly, it was argued that he had expressed his firm belief to Sotheby's that the painting was made by Caravaggio and that this meant Sotheby's was obliged to perform to a higher standard and carry out further tests and enquiries. Rose J, however accepted the evidence proffered by Sotheby's that consignors often have "a strong emotional belief" in their paintings' authenticity and rejected the argument that it could affect the applicable standard, holding that "an auction house must approach each painting on its merits regardless of the state of knowledge or expertise of the consignor."

Thus, Rose J accepted Sotheby's argument that their applicable standard of care was that which 'normally' would operate.

==== Interpreting the test in Luxmoore-May v Messenger May Baverstock ====
The judgement in this case also discussed how to apply the 'normal' standard of care applicable to cases in relation to auction houses which was laid down by the leading Court of Appeal case of Luxmoore-May v Messenger May Baverstock. In that case, an auctioneer from a provincial auction house overlooked a pair of small paintings of foxhounds which turned out to be by George Stubbs, and which sold for £840 and later for £88,000. The court in Luxmoore-May went on to hold that the standard of care for auctioneers was "to express a considered opinion as to sale value of the foxhound pictures and for this purpose to take further appropriate advice". Furthermore, Rose J took up and accepted the distinction identified by the Court of Appeal in Luxmoore between "provincial" and "leading London" auction houses. While in Luxmoore the auctioneer was seen as "provincial" there was no dispute that in this case Sotheby's qualified as a "leading London" auctioneer. This had several implications.

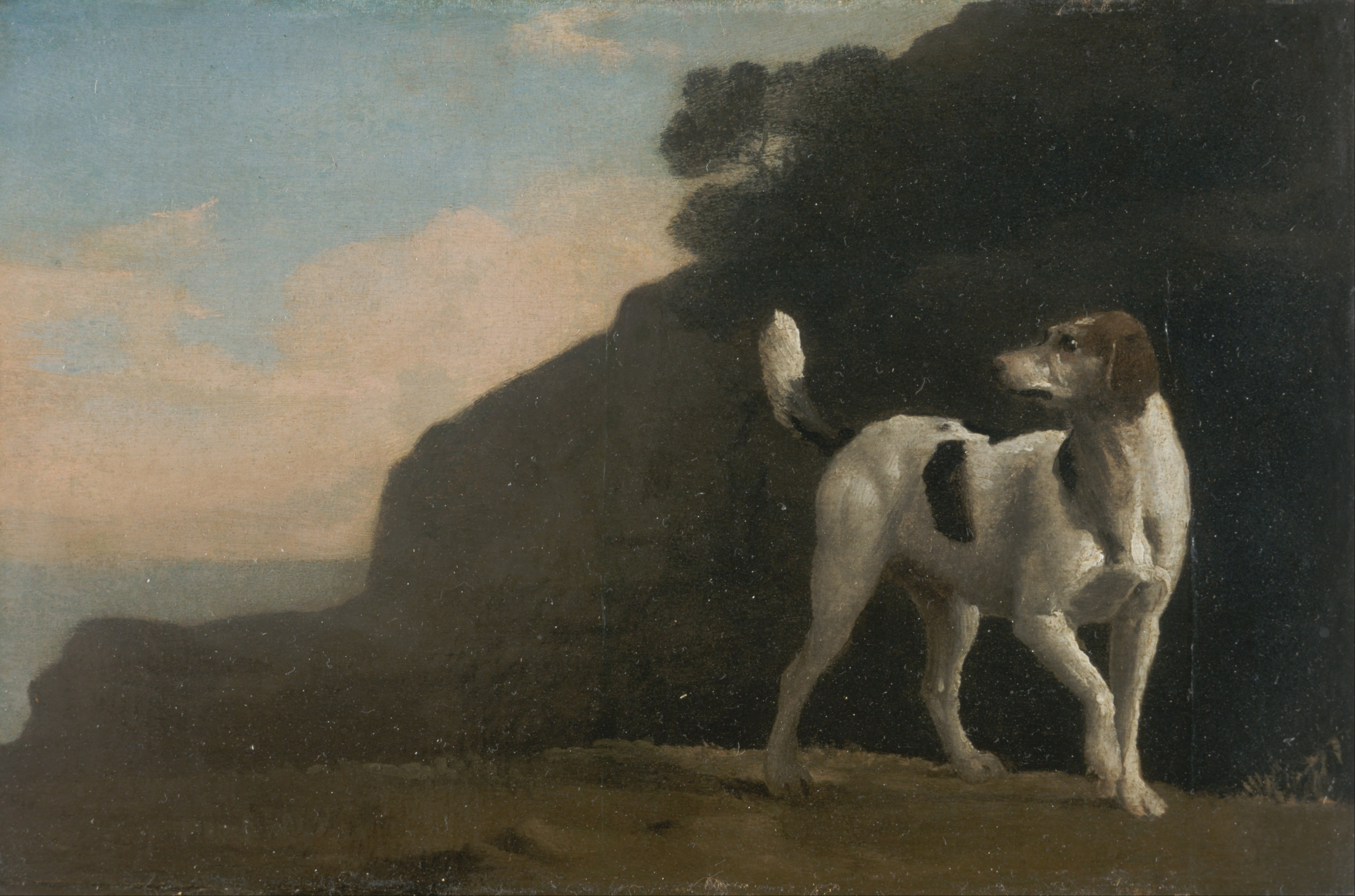
Another painting of a foxhound by George Stubbs (c 1760)

First, it meant that, while provincial auctioneers could to be held to a standard akin to that of a "general practitioner", auction houses like Sotheby's can be expected to have a much larger depth and breadth of expertise and tools available to them as well as access to the senior scholars and art historians as well as having experts available to research paintings before putting them on sale.

Second, leading auctioneers were held to be required to spend sufficient time with each lot so that they can, where possible, "arrive at a firm view" as to how it is to be sold (i.e. as an original, copy by a pupil, by a mere follower etc.).

Third, an auctioneer of Sotheby's stature should not be able to rely on the poor condition of a painting. This contrasts with the auctioneer in Luxmoore-May, who was able to argue that he had been asked to investigate the two foxhound paintings as part of a lot of fifty in a warehouse.

Fourth, a provincial auction house's standard of care was held to demand them to be more aware of the limitations of their own expertise, particularly when compared with the depth of expertise of Sotheby's or Christie's.

Rose J did however accept the suggestion put to her by Thwaytes' counsel that, given that the number of leading auction houses is very limited, in the Old Masters' market possibly just Sotheby's and Christie's, the standard of care for these auction houses should not be limited solely to the practice at these selfsame firms, so as to prevent bad behaviour from seeping and being acceptable.

Nonetheless, this case confirmed that there is a different standard of care depending on the standing of the auction house and that the standard relevant in this case was that of a "leading London" house.

=== Discharging the standard of care and allegations of negligence ===
The scope of Sotheby's duty of care determined, the next question was whether Sotheby's had indeed discharged the standard of care described above. Thwaytes put forward three possible ways in which Sotheby's had been negligent: first, their general approach to assessing the artistic quality of painting; second, that they failed to notice specific visual artistic features in Mahon's painting that "should have alerted them to its Caravaggio potential" such that they ought to have sought further advice and analysis; finally, that Sotheby's failed to communicate their doubts appropriately with Mr Thwaytes (the "Olympia Meeting" point).

==== Sotheby's general approach to assessing paintings ====
The first way in which Sotheby's was alleged to have been negligent was that their whole approach to assessing works of art was flawed. By their own account, for Sotheby's, the "main consideration in assessing a painting is quality". This involved one or more of Sotheby's experts applying their connoisseur's eye to a painting in order to assess its artistic quality and to compare it to known works by the same artist and thus decide if the skill it exemplifies matches that which the expert would expect to find in such known works. Under this approach, there is an initial determination of its quality and thus likely attribution which then determines whether the painting should be investigated further using scientific techniques like x-ray or ultra-violet imaging.

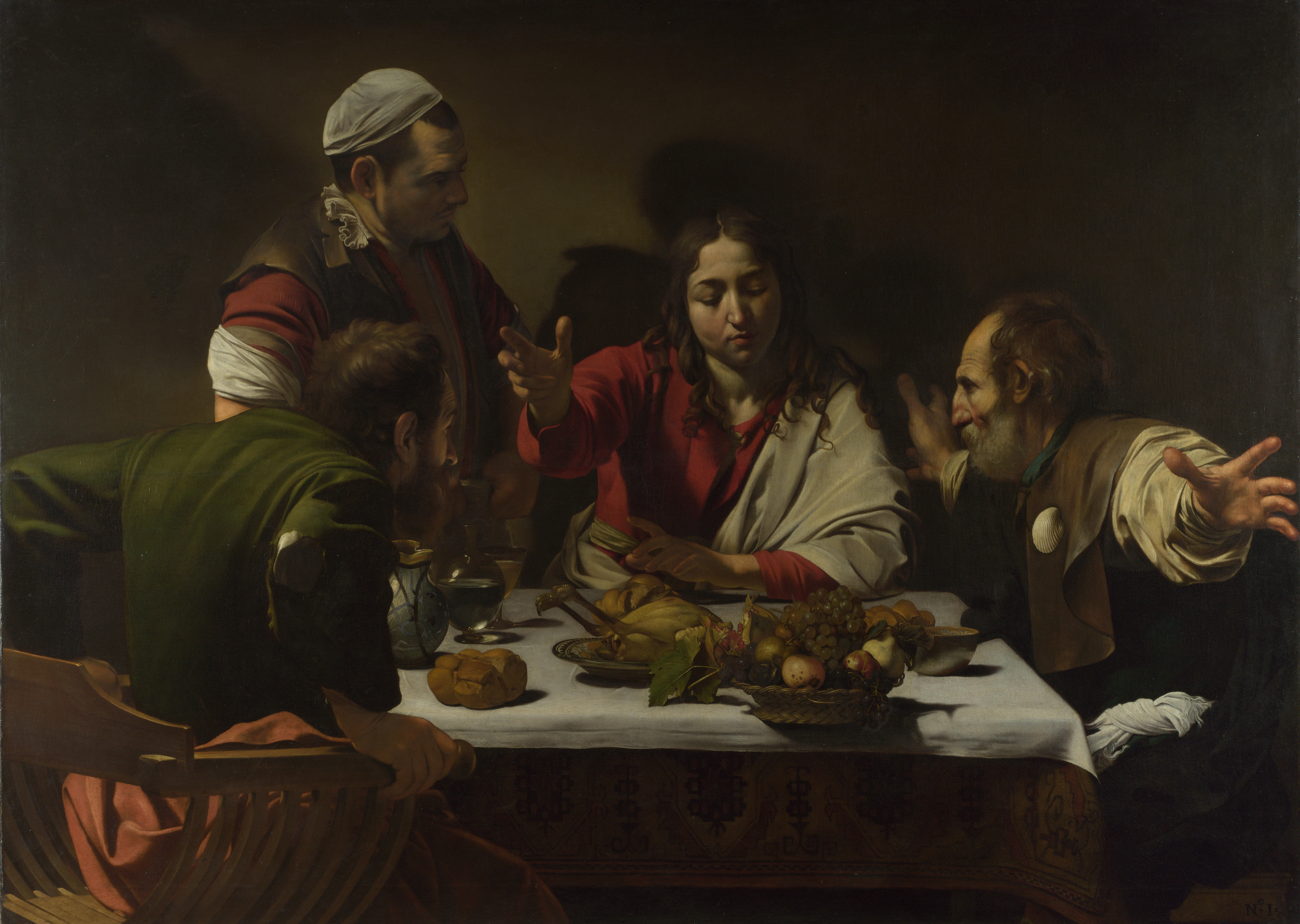
Caravaggio's Supper at Emmaus exhibited at the National Gallery in London

===== Variability in Caravaggio's early works =====
This approach above received criticism from Thwaytes, who argued that while it may be sufficient in a majority of the cases Sotheby's deals with, this particular painting was such that their quality-based approach using internal expertise was insufficient and that external Caravaggio experts, like Mahon, should have been consulted. He argued that what Sotheby's interpreted as a display of inferior quality that disqualified it from being a Caravaggio should instead be seen as an example of the artist's variable and still developing skill in his earlier works.

The judge in this case rejected this argument, accepting Richard E. Spear's evidence that although Caravaggio's early works sometimes had certain errors in perspective or anatomy, they always had an innate and distinctive quality that remains discernible notwithstanding these errors. For example, it was pointed out that although in Supper at Emmaus the foreshortening of the outstretched arm on the rightmost figure is incorrectly done, the picture remains a "masterpiece of composition and craftsmanship".

She also accepted the argument that the qualitative assessment can properly be a comparative exercise, such that if for example a feature present in both versions of the Cardsharps is noticeably of lesser quality in one version, this is a reasonable indicator that the picture is not an original, as it can be assumed that if the artist was able to execute the feature with a given degree of skill, they can do it again.

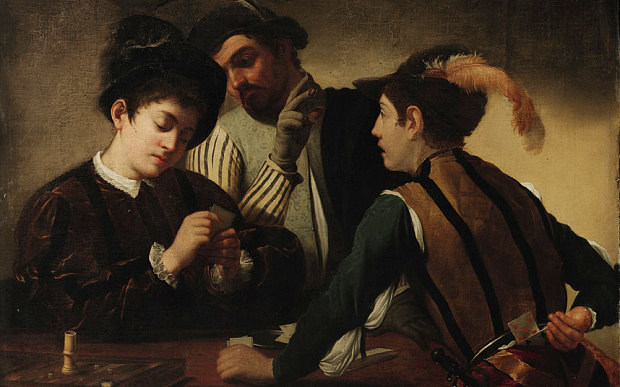
The copy purchased by Sir Denis MahonThe original painting held in the Kimbell Art Museum

===== Caravaggio and autograph replicas =====
It was further argued by Thwaytes that Caravaggio was known to paint autograph replicas and thus Sotheby's should have consulted outside expertise that believed he did paint such autograph replicas of his own work. Many other scholars, however, do not subscribe to this view. Spear, Sotheby's expert, for example, accepted that Caravaggio was known to revisit themes. Nonetheless, he argued that, while sometimes there may be controversy about which of two paintings is an autograph, very few scholars believe that the master painted several copies of the same composition. Sotheby's evidence was that they had been aware of this academic debate but did not find Caravaggio more difficult to attribute than other similar masters.

This point of attribution was echoed by Spear, who noted that, unlike other masters, Caravaggio did not run a workshop, which can sometimes create difficulties in judging the degree of involvement a master had in making the painting. He cited the example of Guido Reni, known to have run a workshop where his apprentices would paint pictures after his own style which he might retouch or finish, making the process of attributing the quality of a painting to Reni more difficult.

While not explicitly ruling on the question of whether Caravaggio made autograph copies of his own works, Rose J ruled that only a minority of scholars ascribe to the view that he did regularly make such copies of the exact same composition, and that leading auction houses do not generally treat early copies of Caravaggio works with special care or note when compared to early copies of other artists' works. She further ruled that this was not a "bad practice" that threatened to expose consignors to "unnecessary risk" and that the existence of the academic debate did not impede Sotheby's from forming their own view.

===== Dirt and old varnish =====
Thwaytes further argued that another issue that should have alerted Sotheby's to the limits of their own expertise and which thus meant they should have sought further assistance was that the painting was dirty and covered in old varnish, which obscured its true qualities.

The judge, however, rejected this submission as impractical as assessing pictures that are dirty or have old varnish is something they do hundred of times per year. She held that it may be possible that where a painting was very dirty or substantially overpainted Sotheby's may need to refer the matter to outside expertise, but that this was not the case for Thwaytes' painting. Indeed, Rose J noted that one of Thwaytes' expert witnesses, Professor Gregori, stated that the painting was not so dirty that its quality was obscured.

===== Interest from a consortium of dealers =====
Lastly, Thwaytes argued that Sotheby's should have been alerted to the limits of its own expertise by the fact that a consortium of art dealers seemed very interested in the painting. This consortium had bid on the painting but stopped at £40,000 (it ultimately sold for £42,000). It was argued that they would not have bid unless they thought they were right but that they had stopped at £40,000 to account for the effort and risk that proving the painting was a genuine Caravaggio would take.

Some experts contested this explanation for the consortium's behaviour, arguing that it was possible they had bid for it as merely a good quality decorative picture and that if they had really believed that the picture was authentic there would have been no reason to stop bidding at £40,000 as its value would then far outweigh the cost of proving this.

While she found the consortium's behaviour hard to explain, the judge ruled that their behaviour did not necessarily put Sotheby's on notice that their assessment of the painting's quality was insufficient, particularly given they only had notice of the consortium's interest late on the day of the sale itself.

==== Reasonability of Sotheby's assessment ====
The reasonability of Sotheby's assessment of the painting as a contemporary copy by another artist was questioned by Thwaytes, while Sotheby's stood by their original position. To support their respective views on whether the painting was or was not made by Caravaggio's hand, the parties relied on several scholars of the artist. Sotheby's mainly relied upon Richard E. Spear. Meanwhile, Helen Glanville, Roberta Lapucci and Professor Gregori provided expert testimony for Thwaytes.

While it was accepted that both sets of experts held their opinions honestly, Spear in particular not only disagreed with his colleagues, but insisted that their opinions "are not reasonably held". In considering the two opinions, Rose J applied the rule in Bolitho v City and Hackney Health Authority that states that when faced with conflicting expert opinions the court is not forced to accept that an opinion is reasonable just because a group of experts honestly hold it. Instead, the court must satisfy itself "that the exponents of the body of opinion relied upon can demonstrate that such opinion has a logical basis". On that basis, she rejected the argument that the strength of disagreement between experts demonstrated that the case was "borderline" and that Sotheby's was necessarily negligent in dismissing the painting as a copy without carrying out further enquiries. Instead, she ruled that she was forced under Bolitho to come to her own conclusions on the basis of the art historical evidence to decide if "no reasonable leading auction house would have concluded on the basis of quality that the Painting could not be by Caravaggio".

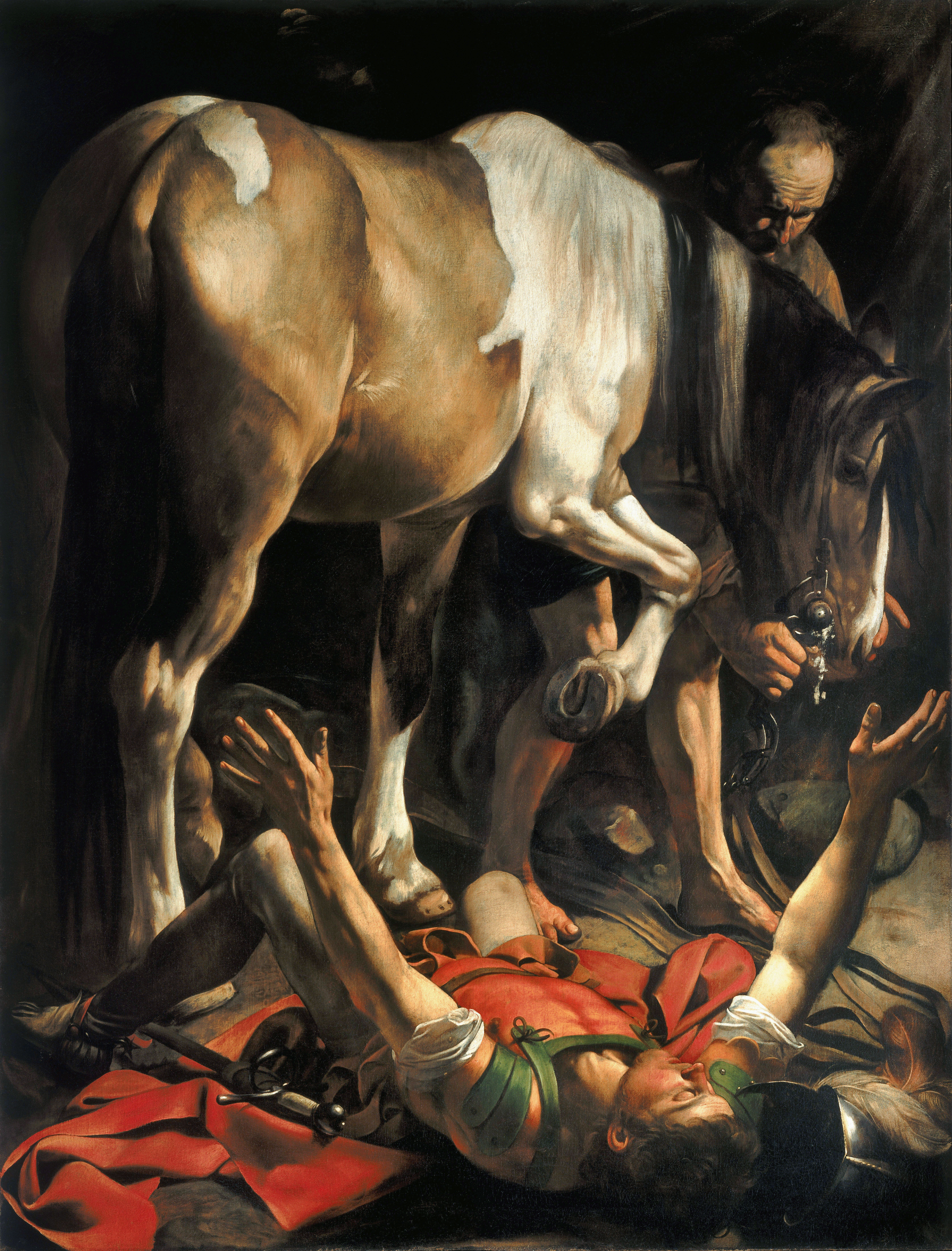
The Conversion of Saint Paul, Cerasi Chapel, Rome

While there were many points of disagreement between the experts, there were four main features that represented the difference of opinion as to quality which Rose J considered. These were the dice holder, the feather on the younger sharp's hat, the clothing and the handling of the light.

===== Dice holder =====
There was disagreement among the experts on whether the differences in the portrayal of the dice holder represented a "mistake", as argued by Spear or experimenting with a different vantage point.

Thwaytes' experts sought to argue that similar errors of perspective are visible in other works by Caravaggio. In particular, it was argued that there were anatomical errors in works like The Conversion of Saint Paul, where the dimension of the legs of the figure on the right are impossible. Likewise, it was argued that in Martha and Mary Magdalene the perspective of the comb is inconsistent with the white bowl to its left.

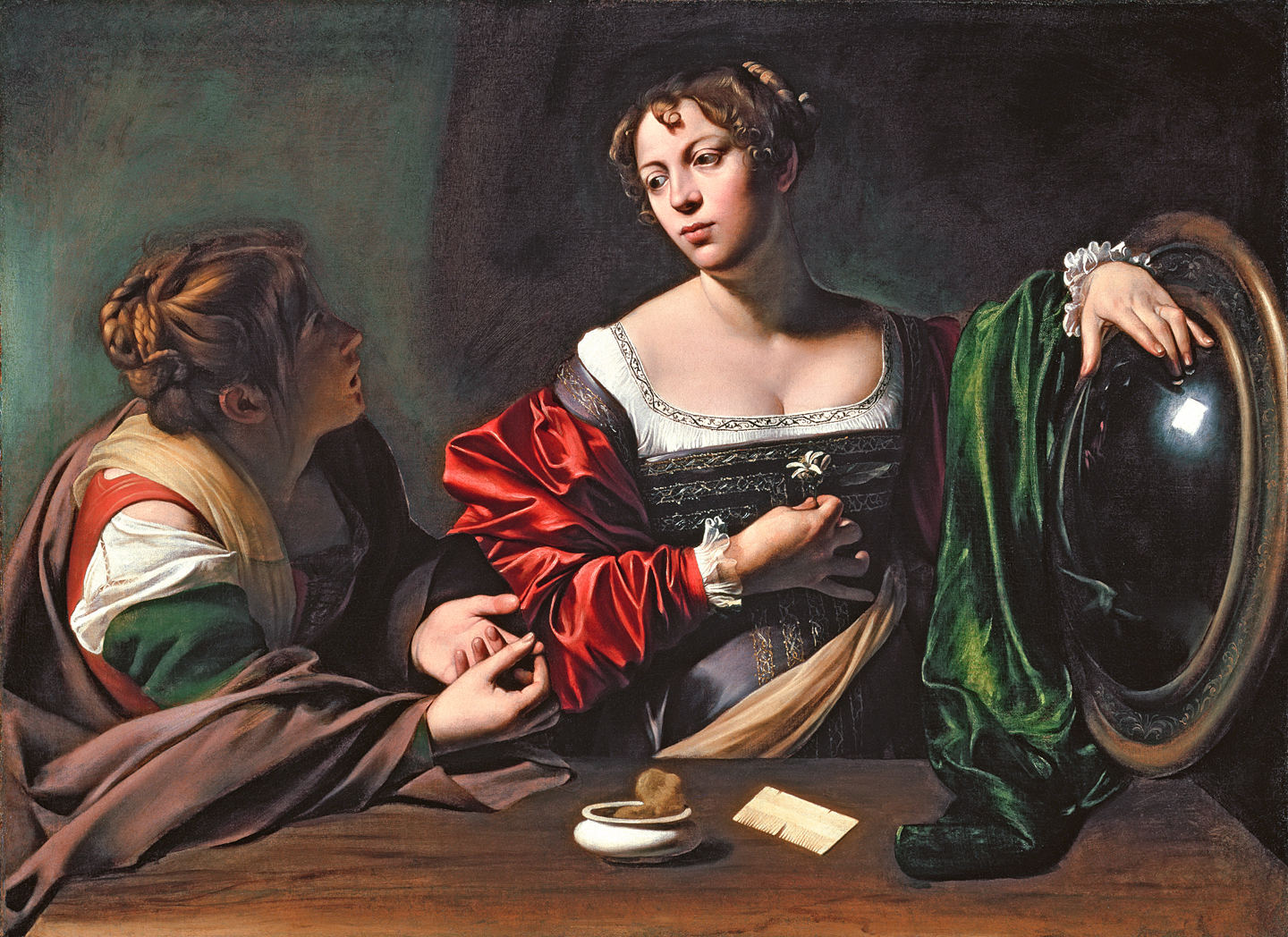
Martha and Mary Magdalene (Detroit Institute of Arts, USA)

Rose J preferred Spear's view, holding that while Caravaggio's works do sometimes exhibit errors or anatomy or perspective, these were always errors exhibited by elements of a painting that arise when compared to other elements of the same picture. She found that the perspective of the dice holder in the Thwaytes–Mahon painting was inconsistent with itself and thus represented a qualitative defect in the painting which was difficult to explain, particularly given the artist had been able to execute it well in the Kimbell version.

===== Feather on the younger sharp's hat =====
Another important difference of opinion arose regarding the ostrich feather on the rightmost player's hat. Spears has proposed that this is the most obvious difference between the paintings. He has called the feather in the Kimbell original "a truly magical evocation of a feather's featheriness". For him, this feature most clearly demonstrates that the author of the Thwaytes–Mahon painting was little more than a "routine copyist."

Rose J agreed with Spear's assessment, finding that it was too waxy to be a truly faithful representation of an ostrich feather and that "the artist of the Painting has not captured the barbs of the feather extending over the hat."

===== Clothing =====
While Gregori, one of Thwaytes' experts, held the view that the execution of the cloth and clothes in the two paintings was of equivalent quality, Spear held that the artist of the Thwaytes–Mahon picture took shortcuts. In particular, he argued that the lace cuffs in the Kimbell picture accurately convey the texture of lace through the intelligent use of white and grey pigments, while the Thwaytes–Mahon painting merely copies the shape of the lace with a "wobbly" texture when compared to the "supple" flow of the original. He took a like view regarding all other depictions of cloth, like the Anatolian on the table and the shirts. Rose J agreed with this assessment.

===== Handling of light =====
There was further disagreement on whether the lighting in the painting was a show of quality. The judge disagreed with Gregori on whether the highlights of the subjects' face were convincing. She further found that the lighting on certain objects like the playing cards and pewter plate was not as well executed in the Mahon painting as it was in the Kimbell version.

As a consequence of the above, Rose J held "that Sotheby's were entitled to come to the view that the quality of the Painting was not sufficiently high to merit further investigation".

==== Features demonstrating "Caravaggio potential" ====
Thwaytes argued that there were several features in the painting that should have alerted Sotheby's to its "Caravaggio potential". Sotheby's strongly contested this, leading to detailed discussion of several more art historical issues at trial. These mainly centred around whether certain features of the painting were characteristic of Caravaggio and whether certain other features were characteristic of not being a copy.

===== Empty space above older sharp's head =====
The dimensions of the Thwaytes–Mahon painting are different from those of the Kimbell original. In particular, this meant that there was a band of empty space above the older sharp's head. It was submitted by Thwaytes that this difference was characteristic of original paintings. At the time of the sale, however, it was known that the Kimbell version had had a strip of canvas removed from that same area during a restoration. It is now known that this additional canvas strip must have been glued to the Kimbell painting at a later date. At the time, however, this fact was not available to Sotheby's. Thus, the judge ruled that it was reasonable for Sotheby's to conclude that the Thwaytes–Mahon version was copying a Kimbell that included the strip.

===== The "black mass" =====
In the Thwaytes–Mahon copy there is a dark "mass" behind the right elbow of the dupe. In evidence, Sotheby's employee accepted that there was a difference between the two versions. It was argued by Thwaytes that differences suggested a creative mind at work that meant the painting was unlikely to be a copy. Rose J, however, accepted Sotheby's counterargument that the black "mass" did not add anything to the composition.

Furthermore, the judge found that if Sotheby's had investigated the question they would have likely found and reasonably relied upon an article in The Burlington Magazine dealing with the history of The Cardsharps which suggested that it was quite likely that the Kimbell original contained a similar dark mass below the dupe's elbow.

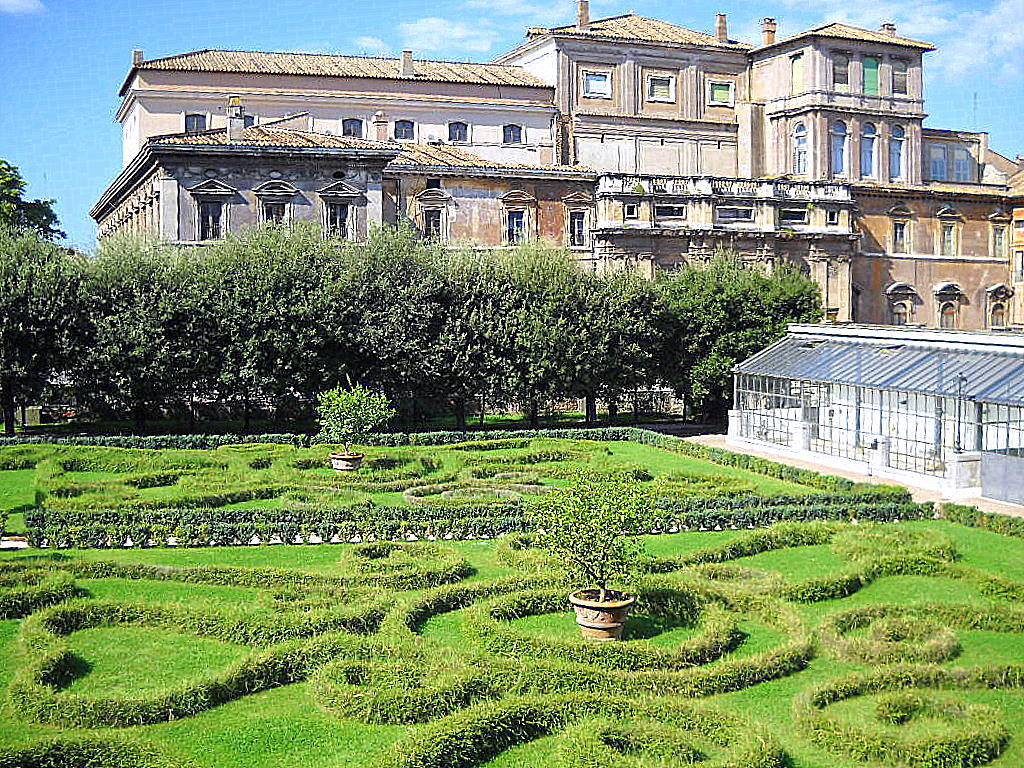
The Palazzo Barberini, which now houses Italy's main national collection of Old Masters, was once the residence of the Sforza and, later, the Barberini families.

===== Miscellaneous features =====
There were several other supposed features that the judge rejected. These included the idea that the Thwaytes–Mahon composition was an improved second version painted from a higher vantage point. Similarly, she rejected the idea that the palette and lighting of the two versions was significantly different, which, again, may have suggested some creative iteration on the same composition.

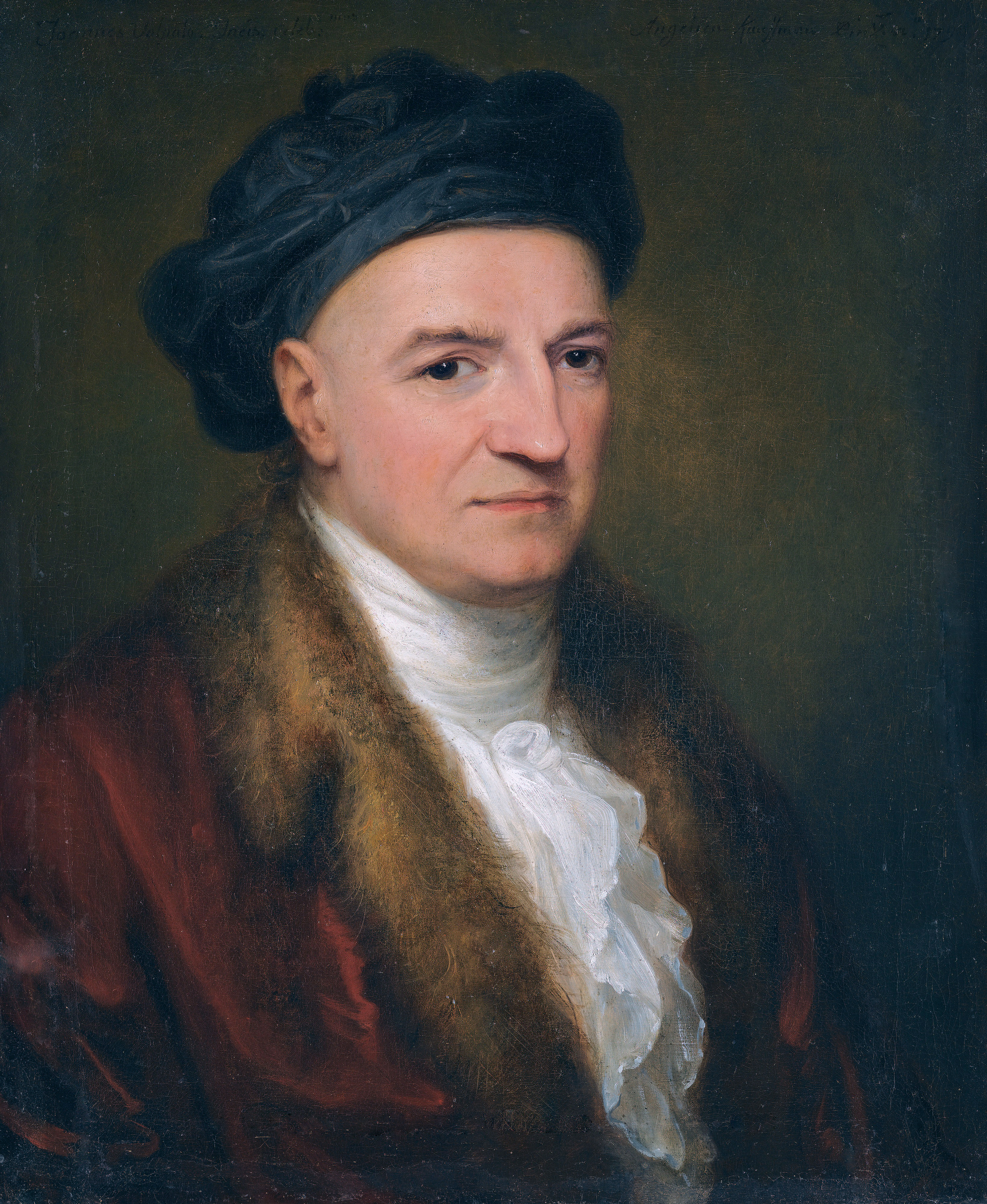
Giovanni Volpato, 1735–1803

Rose J also dismissed the suggestion that a difference in the bow in the younger sharp's shirt was significant enough. Likewise, she also rejected the idea that there was a distinctive decorative pattern in the Thwaytes–Mahon dice holder.

===== The Volpato engraving =====
In 1772, Giovanni Volpato published a print of The Cardsharps whose caption indicated that it was made from the painting in the Palazzo Barberini. This print was the main way the composition was known during the time that the painting was believed lost. A photograph of this print appeared in the Burlington Magazine article mentioned above.

There was a discussion as to whether this print was made from the Kimbell or the Thwaytes–Mahon versions. On the one hand, the print shows the aforementioned black mass of the Thwaytes–Mahon. On the other hand, the lighting in the print is more similar to the Kimbell as is the face of the dupe. Furthermore, the provenance of the Kimbell, namely a stamp on the back of the canvas, suggested it was once part of the Barberini collection. Lastly, Rose J noted that the face of younger sharp was different to both of the paintings.

While assuming that Sotheby's should have looked and considered the Volpato engraving (which Sotheby's did not do), the judge did hold that, had Sotheby's done this, it would have made no difference.

===== X-ray features =====
As part of their enquiries prior to sale, Thwaytes instructed Sotheby's to make x-ray images of the painting. It was common ground that Sotheby's had a duty to analyse the images competently. It was argued that Sotheby's did not have the competence to properly interpret the images and that they should have sought out experts to interpret them for them. Rose J, however, rejected this submission, holding that Sotheby's should not necessarily send out the x-ray images to outside experts, even if they were not experts in analysing x-ray photography themselves.

The judge further agreed with Sotheby's that the x-ray images showed that the painting lacked any major pentimenti. Had these been present, they would have been a sign that the painting was an original work.

===== Infrared features =====
Another issue considered was whether Sotheby's was instructed by Thwaytes to carry out infrared photography of the picture and whether they should have encouraged him to do so. After purchasing it, Mahon carried out infrared photography on the picture and Thwaytes' experts claimed the infrared tests revealed pentimenti which strengthened their attribution to Caravaggio. Sotheby's expert rejected that there were any significant pentimenti.

Rose J, however, ruled that Sotheby's had not been instructed to carry out infrared imagining, that they were right not to encourage Thwaytes to obtain such tests, and, further, that even if the tests had been carried out, the features visible in the infrared images did not establish that it was by Caravaggio.

==== Olympia meeting ====
While the painting was being exhibited by Sotheby's prior to the sale in order to generate interest, Sotheby's employees noted that the painting was attracting a large amount of attention. Thus they called a second meeting of its in-house experts to consider whether they had made the correct attribution. They decided they had. Thwaytes was not informed that this second meeting took place.

During the trial, Thwaytes also alleged that – aside from missing the visual features discussed above – Sotheby's had also been negligent in not informing him of this second 'Olympia' (Note: So called because the meeting happened at Sotheby's 'Olympia' sales room, where the picture was being exhibited and was ultimately sold.) meeting because he would have removed the painting from the sale. Rose J rejected this argument, preferring the view that Thwaytes would not have removed the painting from the sale if he had been told of the Olympia meeting.

=== Overall result ===
==== Negligence ====
As detailed above, Rose J rejected all of Thwaytes' allegations of negligence. This was sufficient to dismiss both the action founded on the tort of negligence and the one based on breach of contract.

==== Causation and quantum of damages ====
Nonetheless, as is common, Rose J went on to consider the issues of causation and quantum of damages, in case she was found by an appeal court to have erred in her conclusions as to negligence.

She was convinced that if Sotheby's had believed it was a painting by Caravaggio and had obtained positive attributions it would have been able to catalogue with both the positive and negative attributions to Caravaggio and that it would have fetched a higher price. She, however, explicitly refused to rule that it would have exceeded the actual sale price by the millions Thwaytes' claimed.

== Impact and reception ==
=== Open questions ===
Rose J left two questions undecided. First, what the right measure of damages would have been; and second, whether, if the general view had been that the painting was genuine, Sotheby's would have had to have gone against their own view that it was not.

==== Measure of damages ====
First, Rose J left open – had Sotheby's been negligent – what the right measure of damages would have been. Thwaytes argued that his loss was the difference between the price the painting was sold for and what it would have been sold for in a hypothetical world where Sotheby's catalogued it as a contested Caravaggio. She expressed doubt that this was right, but did not rule one way or the other.

==== Scope of Sotheby's obligation ====
Second, Rose J considered whether Sotheby's duty of care extended to making sure Thwaytes benefited from the currency of a mistaken opinion. Sotheby's argued that if the general opinion at the time had been that the painting was genuine, their duty of care would not have extended to selling it as genuine. Although she thought it was an "interesting legal point", she declined to rule.

This question had also been considered in previous cases, where the courts had generally said that agents like auctioneers do not have a duty to make fanciful attributions or to express doubts that it does not have, so long as they are genuinely confident of their own view. Commentators like Isabel Paintin have considered this issue and approve of the law's approach. This issue was then further considered and ruled upon in the 2022 case of Countess of Wemyss and March v Dickinson.

=== Clarification of auctioneers' duty of care ===
Another important impact of this case was how it clarified that there are different standards of care for the two great auction houses (Sotheby's and Christie's) and other smaller auctioneers. This clarification was generally welcomed, but it did raise the question of whether Sotheby's and Christie's, currently the only two leading auction houses, could in effect set their own standard of care. Rose J considered similar cases and clarified that they could not and that the test remained objective (i.e. what would a leading London auctioneer do?), not merely whether the leading auctioneer had followed their own past (and possibly negligent) practice.

Some academic commentators, like Paintin, have argued, however, that there is an inherent tension in the distinction between the provincial and leading auction houses because although the former must be more aware of their own limitations, they are also recognised to have reduced access to the best experts. Likewise, Paintin argues, that if having access to the best experts is raising the standard of care of prime auction houses, this must assume that they are consulting them more, which this part of the test seems to reject.

== See also ==
- Art law
- Negligence
- Bolitho v City and Hackney HA
