= Luigi Salerno =

Italian art historian (1924–1992)

- Born: September 3, 1924; Rome
- Died: July 22, 1992 (aged 67); Rome
- Occupation: Art historian

Luigi Salerno (1924–1992) was an Italian historian of Italian art and historiographer. He is particularly known as a scholar of the Italian baroque and Salvator Rosa, with expertise on the 17th century, including Guercino and Caravaggio.

Luigi Salerno was a student of Lionello Venturi. He went to London in 1948 and in 1949, working with the Warburg Institute. In 1953 he married Elda Campana. He received a prize for his work studying the links between the English and Italian art in 1600–1700. This work was appreciated by Rudolf Wittkower. He won the Fulbright prize and in London he started a prolific relation with Denis Mahon.

In the early 1960s, in collaboration with Mahon, he authenticated two Caravaggio paintings in American museums: “Martha and Mary Magdalene” (Detroit Institute of Arts) and “The Crucifixion of Saint Andrew” (Cleveland Museum of Art).

In 1965 Luigi Salerno was a professor at Penn State University in the United States.

== Biography ==
He was born to Aldo Salerno and Maria Santangelo, niece of art historian Antonino Santangelo. He studied under Lionello Venturi at the Sapienza University of Rome where he graduated in 1946 with a thesis on the Macchiaioli. Thanks to a scholarship, he lived in London in 1948-1949, at the Warburg Institute. In the institute's 1951 journal, he published a study on the links between English and Italian art in the 1600s and 1700s, which was highly appreciated by Rudolf Wittkower. In London, he began a prolific relationship with Denis Mahon.

Back in Rome, he continued his collaboration with the Antiquities and Fine Arts Department of the Ministry of Education, and in 1953 he married Elda Campana.

He edited Giulio Mancini Osservazioni sulla Pittura (Observations on Painting), promoted in 1956 by the Accademia dei Lincei, and published the inventory of Vincenzo Giustiniani's collection. In 1959, he published Altari barocchi (Baroque Altars), a study of Roman artifacts.

In 1958, he was promoted to director of monuments for Lazio, and the following year he became a professor at the University of Rome.

In the early 1960s, in collaboration with Mahon, he authenticated two paintings by Caravaggio owned by American museums: Martha and Mary Magdalene (Caravaggio) at the Detroit Institute of Arts and The Crucifixion of Saint Andrew at the Cleveland Museum of Art.

In the fall of 1965, Luigi Salerno taught as a visiting professor at Pennsylvania State University in the United States. In 1967, he was appointed director of the Calcografia Nazionale, but in 1973 he, against his will, was transferred to the superintendence of L'Aquila, which he soon abandoned to devote himself solely to his studies. He subsequently published L'opera completa di Salvator Rosa in 1975, I dipinti del Guercino in 1988, and the three volumes of I pittori di vedute in Italia in 1991. Meanwhile, he edited the catalog for the exhibition The Age of Caravaggio at the Metropolitan Museum (1985). He also published a series of texts on architectural and urban spaces, culminating in 1975 with Via Giulia: una utopia urbanistica del 500 (Via Giulia: an urban utopia of the 1500s), edited together with Luigi Spezzaferro and Manfredo Tafuri.

Luigi Salerno had 2 sons, Pietro Paolo, art dealer who donated his archive and sold photos to the Getty Institutes and Carlo Stefano, also art historian.

The son Pietro Paolo Salerno, art dealer, sold photos and donated his father's archive to the Getty Research Institute
   https://oac.cdlib.org/findaid/ark:/13030/c8pc31c0
   Acquisition information:
   Acquired as partial donation from Pietro Paolo Salerno, son of Luigi Salerno, in 2000. ~2025-43593-77
