= Athena Tacha =

Greek visual artist

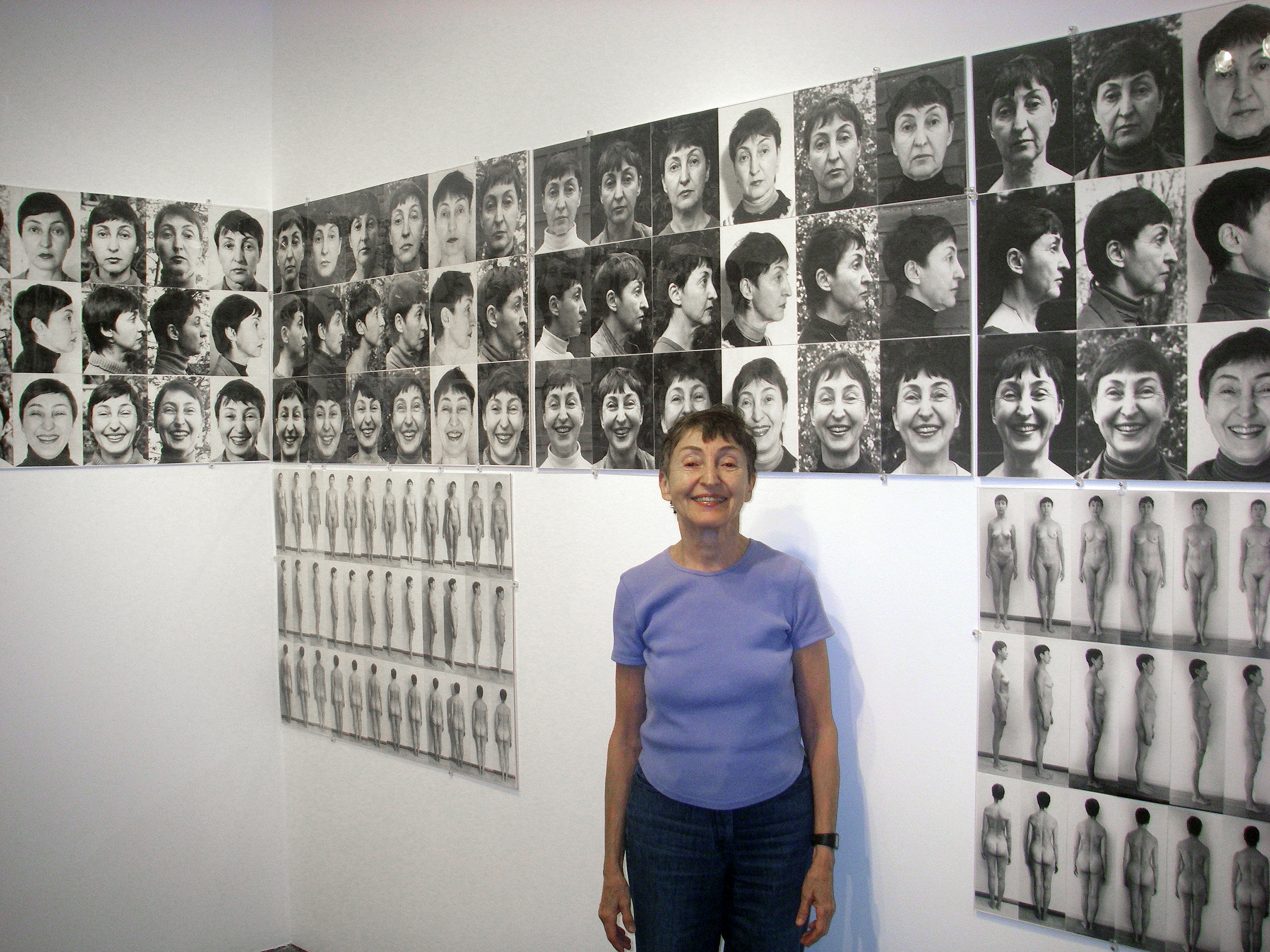
- Artist Athena Tacha in front of her 36 Years of Aging, Eclipse Gallery, Arlington, VA, 2008
- Born: 1936 (age 89–90); Larissa, Greece
- Education: Athens School of Fine Arts, M.A. in sculpture (1959); Oberlin College, M.A. in art history (1961); Sorbonne, Doctorate in aesthetics (1963)
- Known for: environmental sculpture public sculpture, conceptual art

Athena Tacha (Greek: Αθηνά Τάχα; b. 1936 in Larissa, Greece), is a multimedia visual artist. She is best known for her work in the fields of environmental public sculpture and conceptual art. She also worked in a wide array of materials including stone, brick, steel, water, plants, L.E.D. lighting, photography, film, and artists’ books. Tacha's work often was inspired by the frontiers of science and an unflinching observation of her own behavior and body.

== Early life, education, and academic career ==
Tacha was born in 1936 in Greece. She received an M.A. in sculpture from the Athens School of Fine Arts in Greece (1959); an M.A. in art history from Oberlin College, Oberlin, Ohio (1961); and a Doctorate in aesthetics from the Sorbonne in Paris (1963). After her studies, she worked as the curator of modern art at the Allen Memorial Art Museum of Oberlin College, organizing contemporary art exhibitions (including Art In The Mind, 1970). In 1965 she married art historian Richard Spear. She has published two books and various articles on Auguste Rodin, Brâncuși, Nadelman and other 20th-century sculptors. From 1973 to 2000, she was a professor of sculpture at Oberlin College. After moving to Washington, D.C. in 1998, she became an affiliate of the University of Maryland, College Park. Tacha's life and career are richly documented in a three-day interview (2009) as part of the Oral History Program of the Archives of American Art, which houses Tacha's, films, slides, and papers.

== Artwork ==
One of the first artists to develop environmental site-specific sculpture in the early 1970s, Tacha has won over fifty competitions for permanent public art commissions, of which nearly forty have been executed throughout the U.S. One of these public works was a two-acre sculptural landscape in downtown Philadelphia, Pennsylvania entitled Connections within Matthias Baldwin Park. She has had six one-artist shows in New York—at the Zabriskie Gallery, the Max Hutchinson Gallery, Franklin Furnace, the Foundation for Hellenic Studies, and the Kouros Gallery—and has exhibited in numerous group shows throughout the world, including the Venice Biennale. She produced a body of textual and photographic conceptual works and poetic studies, many of which were published as artist's books.

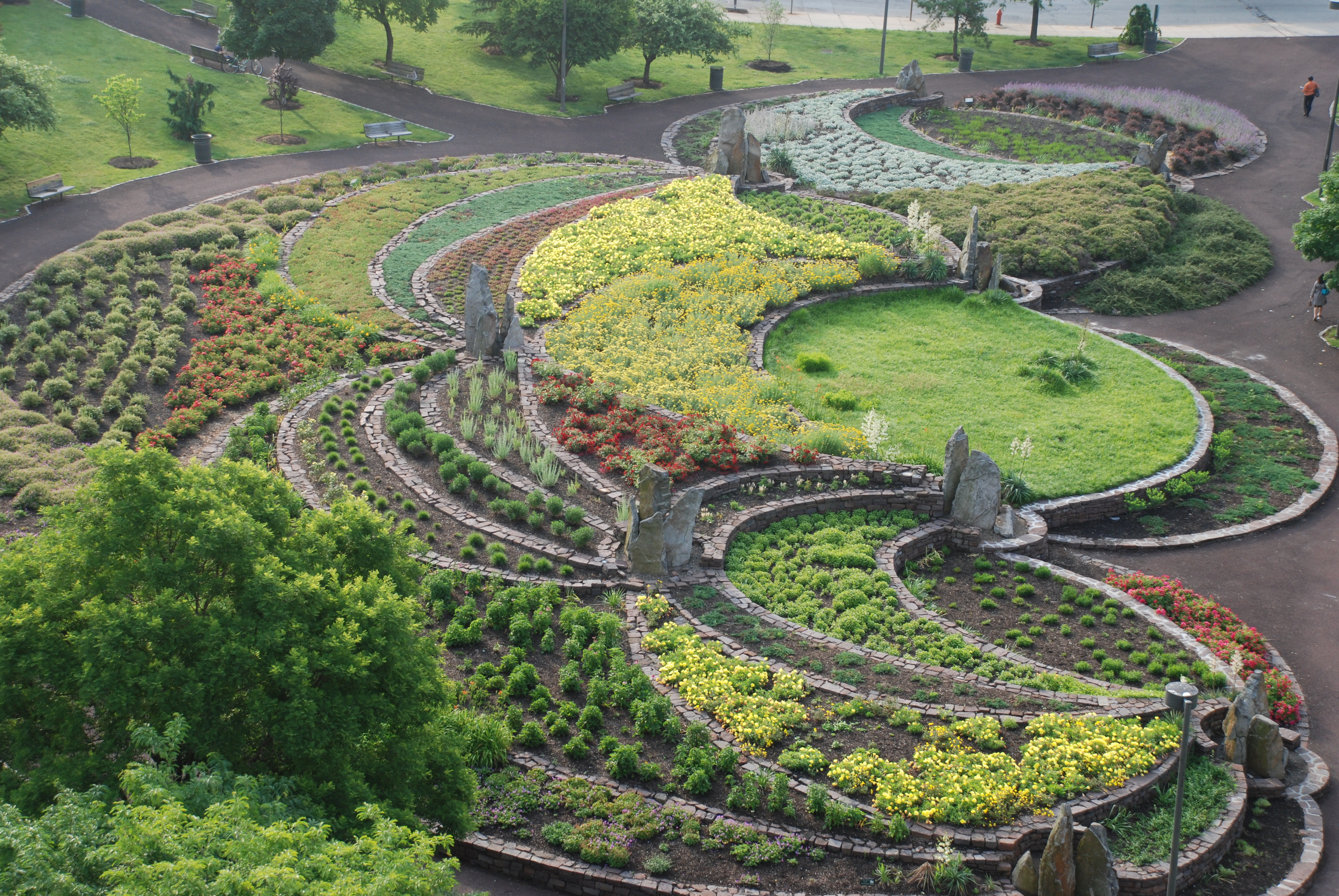
Athena Tacha, Connections, 1981-92, Philadelphia, aerial view 2009 (photo by Jim Fennell)

Athena Tacha's artist books were printed between 1970 and 2014. An interactive online display of the artist books and other printed materials can be found at Printed Matter, Inc.The pocket books series are twenty-seven small folded books, similar to a zine that were often sold in a plastic sleeve. In The Way My Mind Works, Tacha writes about her schizophrenic mind, her ruminating mind, her orderly mind. Others in the pocket series examine everyday life. The larger artist books focus on geometry, space, and minimalism. A Dictionary of Steps displays diagrams of steps. In addition, Tacha explored self portraiture, in works like Gestures and Expressions.

== Exhibitions ==
In 1989, a retrospective of more than 100 of Tacha's sculptures, drawings and conceptual photographic pieces was held at the High Museum of Art in Atlanta. It included large color photographs of her executed commissions and was accompanied by a fully illustrated catalog, Athena Tacha: Public Works, 1970-88 (introductory essay by John and Catherine Howett). The same year, she had an exhibition of new work, over 50 sculptures and drawings, as well as two large temporary installations, at the Cleveland Center for Contemporary Art, also accompanied by a richly illustrated catalog (with an essay by Thalia Gouma-Peterson).Small Wonders: New Sculpture and Photoworks at the American University's Katzen Arts Center, Washington, DC, 2006, had a fully illustrated catalog with essays by Anne Ellegood and Brenda Brown (reinstalled in New York at Kouros Gallery in 2007). She was represented by the Marsha Mateyka Gallery in Washington, D.C.

A 40-year retrospective (over 100 works), "Athena Tacha: From the Public to the Private," opened at the Contemporary Art Center (State Museum of Contemporary Art) in Thessaloniki, Greece, Jan. 16 - April 11, 2010. It presents for the first time all aspects of Tacha's art—from large outdoor commissions, to "body sculptures" and photoworks, to conceptual art and films—with a bilingual catalog (164 pp., 113 color illustrations). Afterwards, the exhibition traveled to Larissa and Athens.

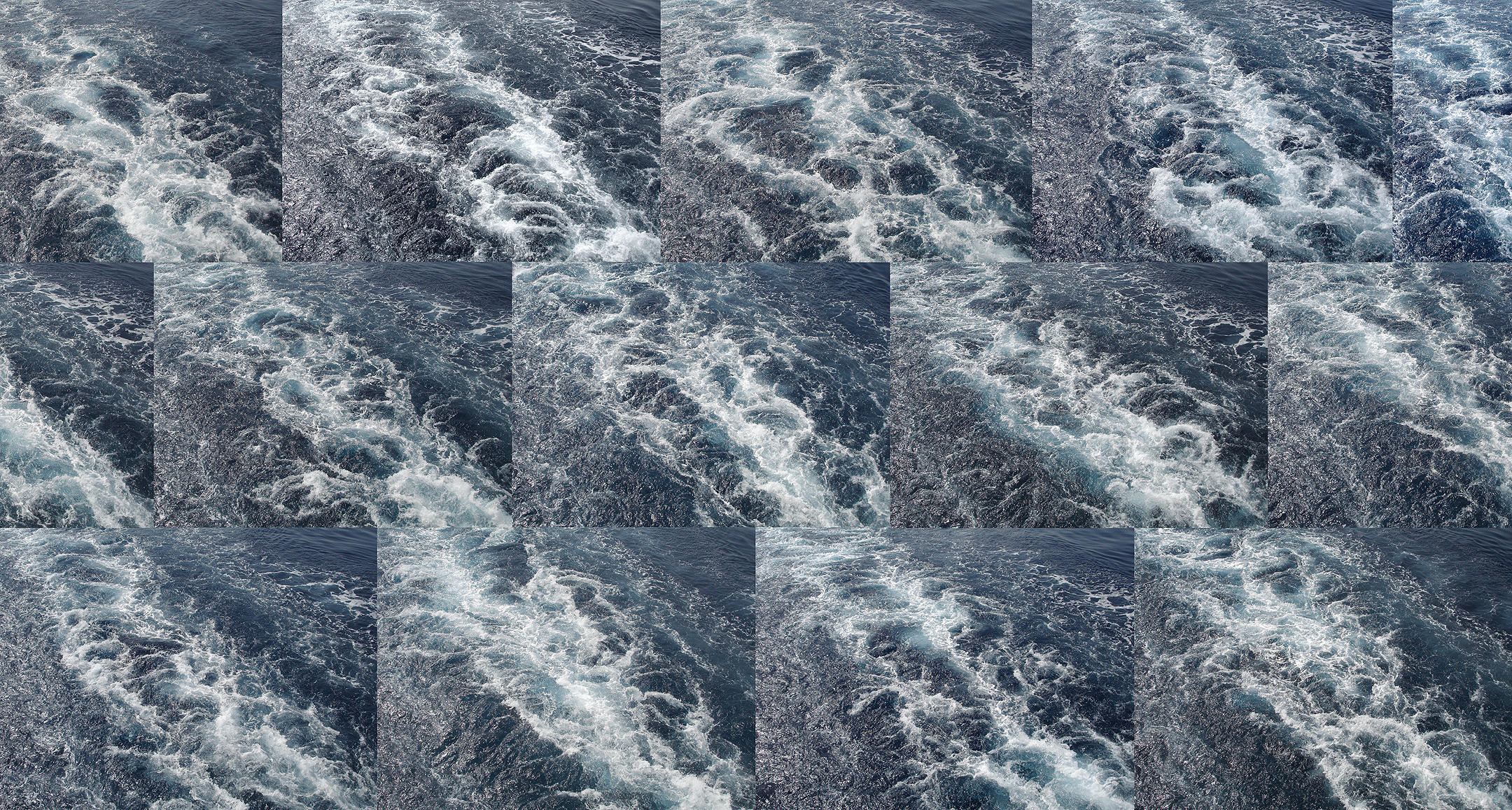
Athena Tacha, Crossing - Sardinia (2007), digichrome, 30"x54", Coll. Ingleside at Rock Creek, Washington, D.C.

Tacha's sculptures and photo-works are in many American museums and private collections, including the Art Institute of Chicago, the Bowdoin College Museum of Art, the Buffalo AKG Art Museum, the Cleveland Museum of Art, the Hirshhorn Museum, the National Building Museum, the National Gallery, Athens, the Nelson-Atkins Museum of Art, the Smithsonian American Art Museum, the Yale University Art Gallery, and the Agnes Gund Collection.

=== Latest executed commissions (2001–09) ===
- Victory Plaza, 2000–02, a 40,000 sq ft (3,700 m^{2}) plaza with fountains in front of the American Airlines Center (in collaboration with SWA), Dallas, Texas
- STOP & GO: to Garrett Augustus Morgan, 2001–04, a plaza for Metrorail's Morgan Blvd. Station, Washington, DC
- Hearts Beat, 2002–04, a 350-foot (110 m) long ceiling of animated LEDs for a sky bridge between Grosvenor Metro station and the Strathmore Music Center, N. Bethesda, Maryland.
- Riding with Sarah and Wayne, 2004–06, a mile-long trackbed pavement for the Light Rail, Newark, New Jersey.

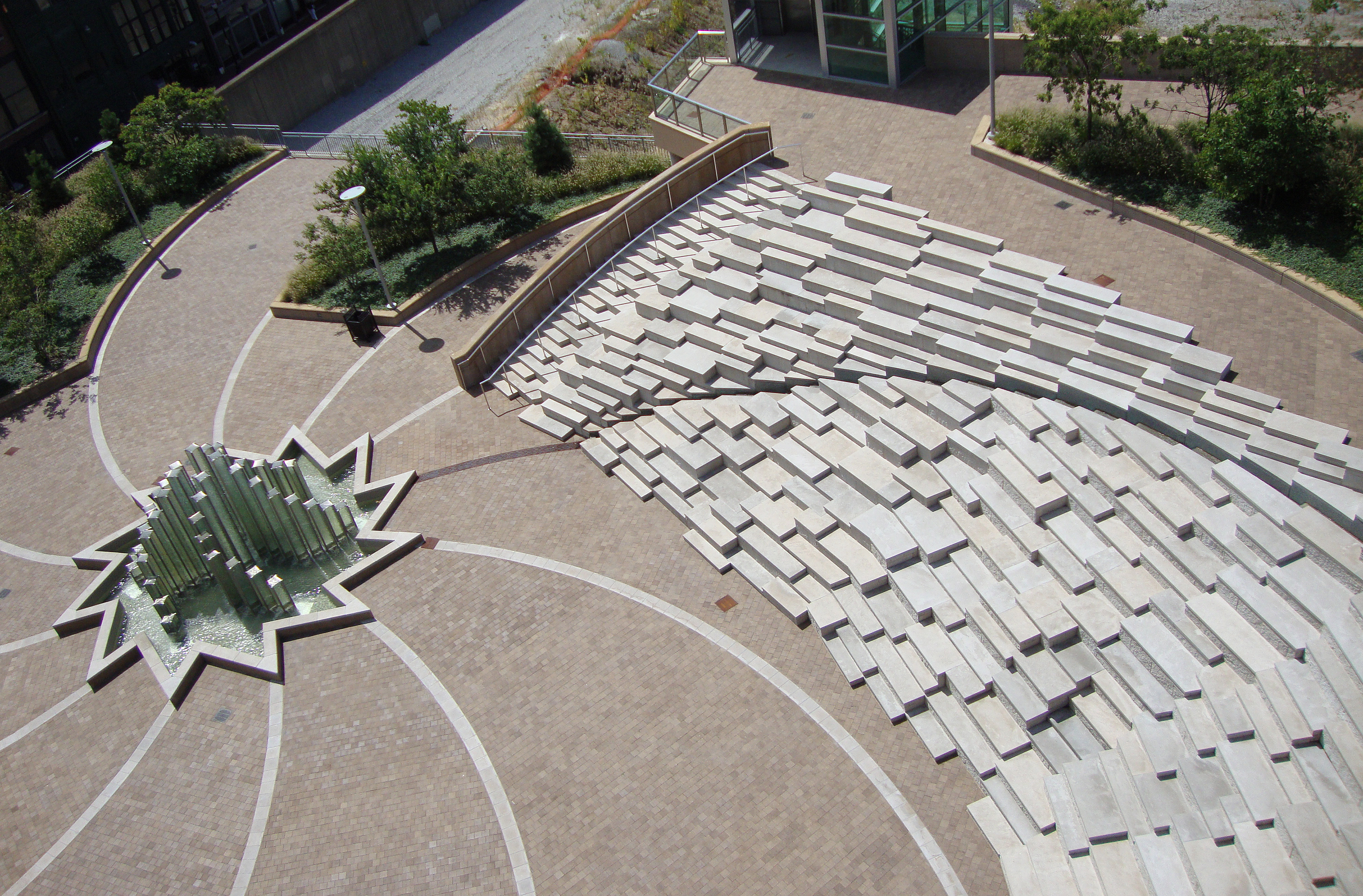
Athena Tacha, Dancing Steps amphitheater and Star Fountain (aerial view), Muhammad Ali Plaza, Louisville, KY

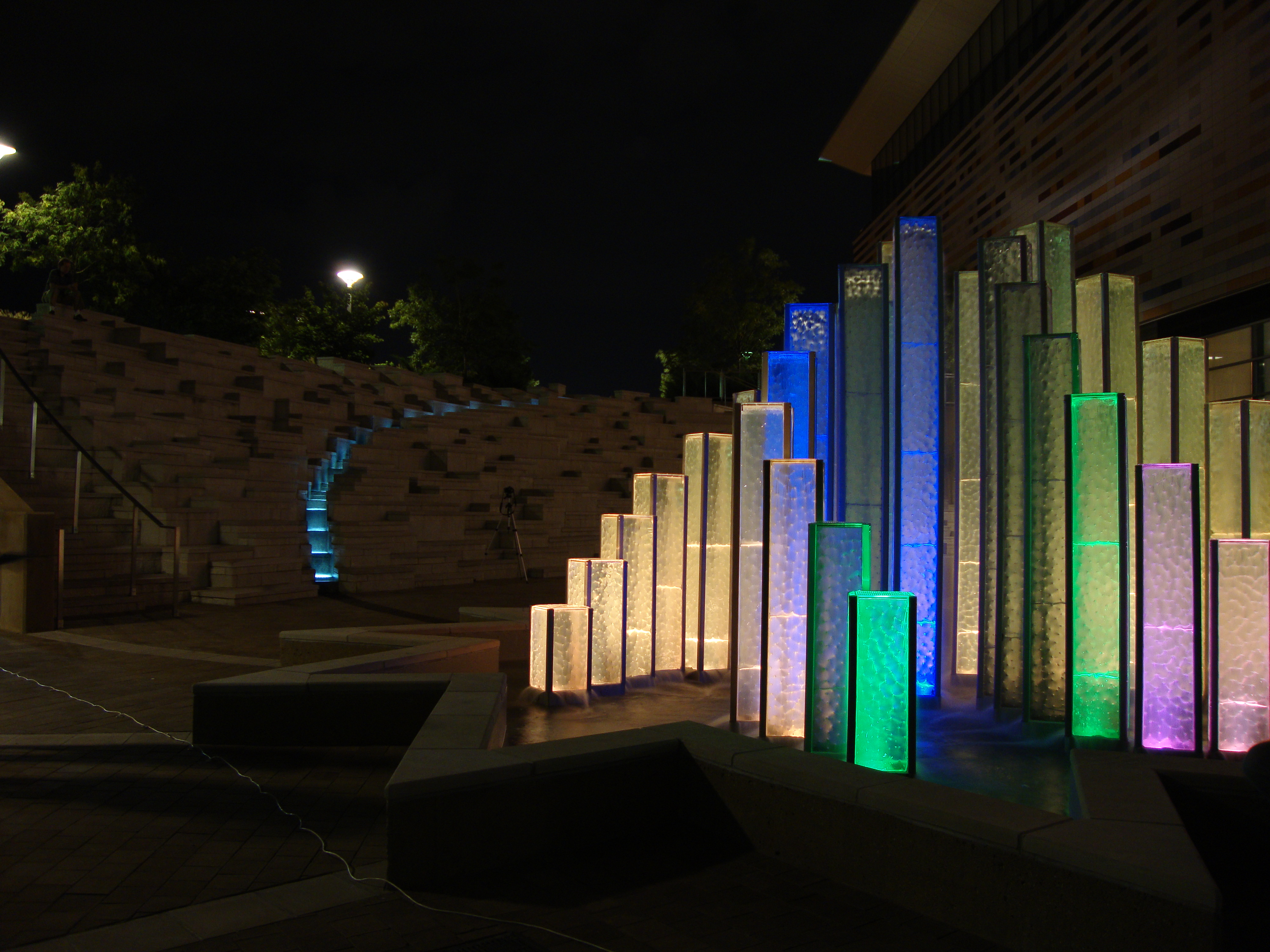
Athena Tacha, Star Fountain at night (7-minute RGB animation), Muhammad Ali Center Plaza, Louisville, KY (photo Richard E. Spear)

- An amphitheater and two fountains for the Muhammad Ali Center Plaza (ca. 5000 m2), 2002–09, in collaboration with EDAW, AGA and Color Kinetics, Louisville, KY.

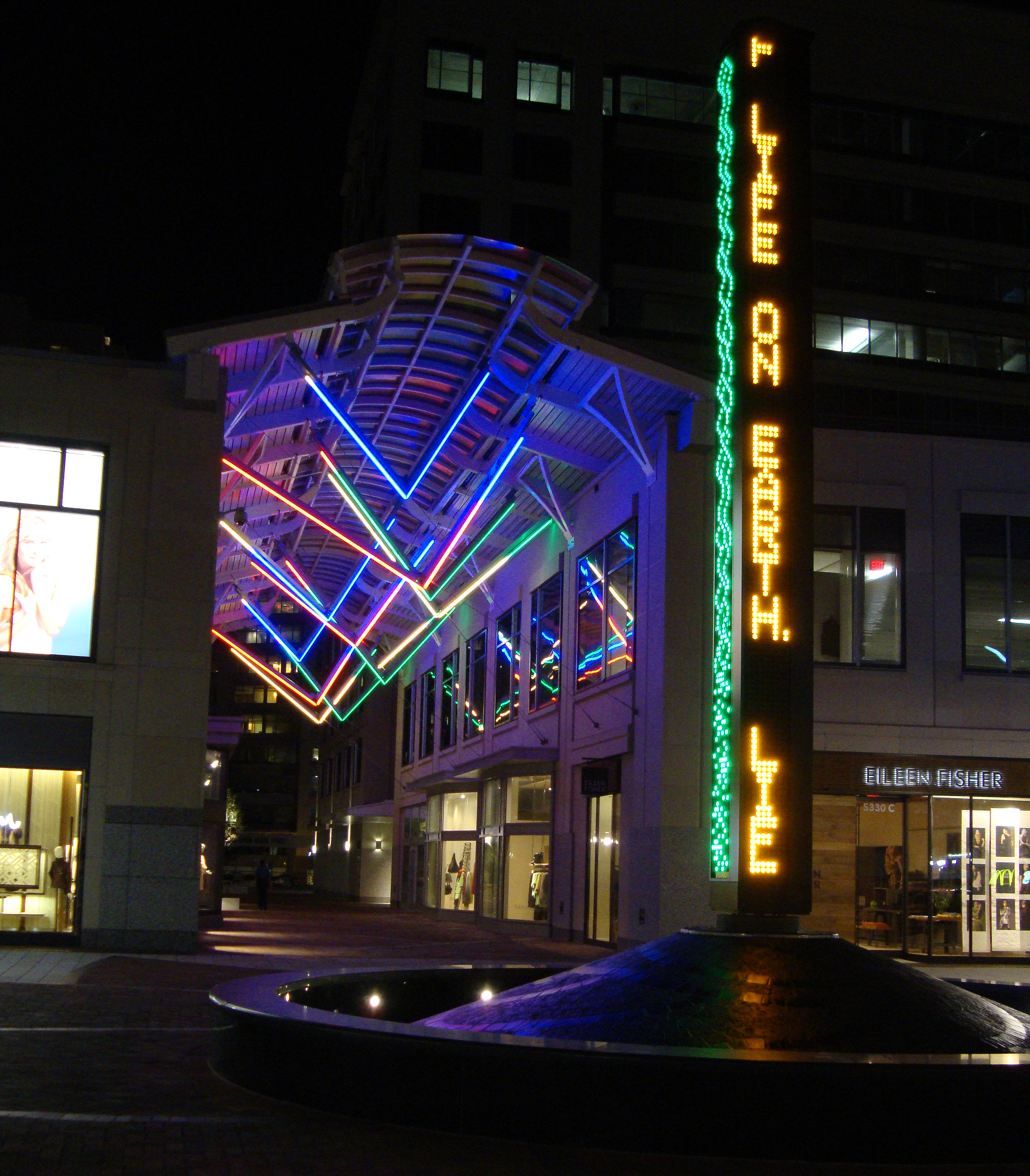
Athena Tacha, Light Obelisk Fountain with Light Riggings arcade (4-minute RGB animation), Wisconsin Place, Bethesda, DC/MD (photo Richard E. Spear)

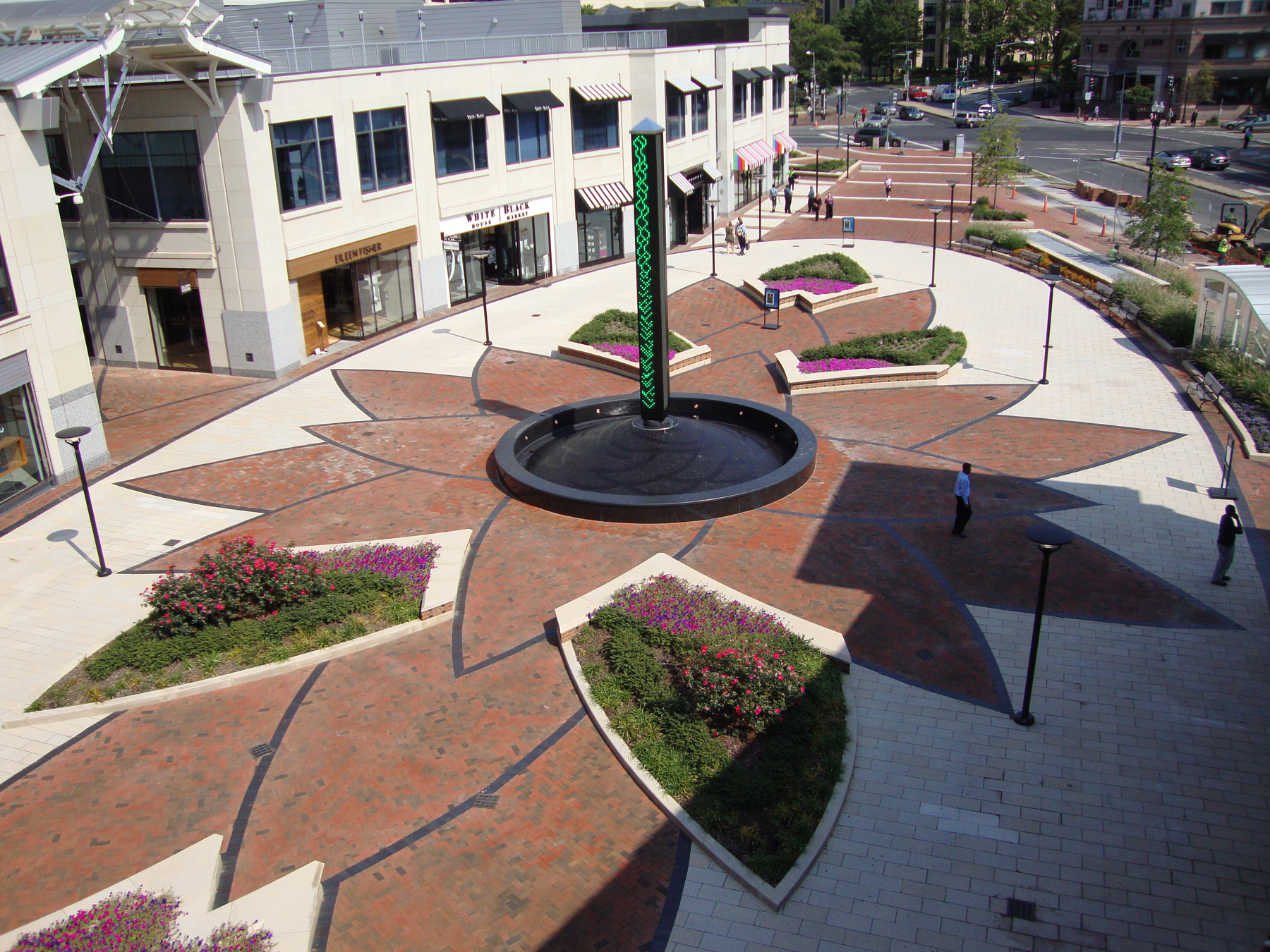
Athena Tacha, Friendship Plaza with Light Obelisk Fountain (aerial view), Wisconsin Place, Bethesda, DC/MD (photo Richard E. Spear)

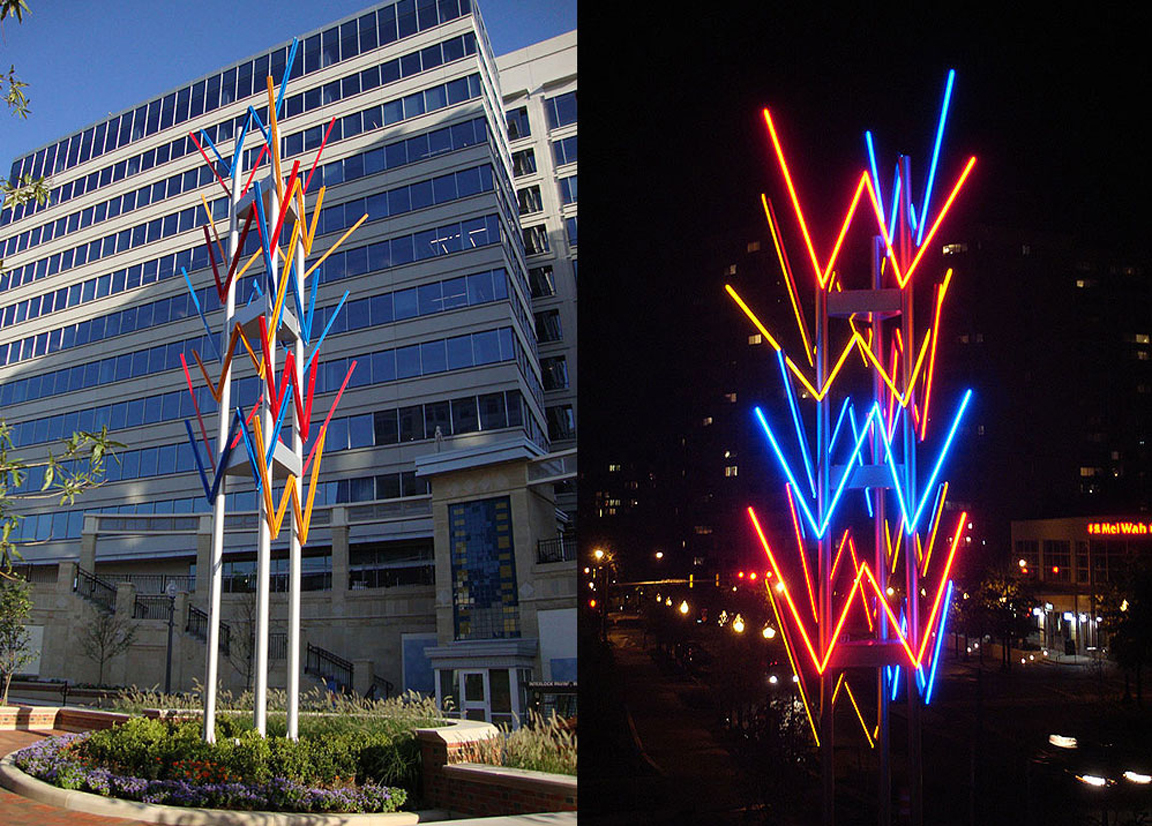
Athena Tacha, WWW-Tower, day and night (animated LEDs), Wisconsin Place, Bethesda, DC/MD (photo Richard E. Spear)

- A plaza pavement with a Light Obelisk Fountain in front of Bloomingdale's; an arcade ceiling, Light Riggings, with RGB animation; and a LED sculpture, WWW-Tower, 2001-09—in collaboration with Arrowstreet Inc., CRJA and Art Display Co. -- for Wisconsin Place, a 5-acre (20,000 m^{2}) development at Friendship Heights Metro station, Bethesda, Maryland.

== Books, catalogs, and articles ==
Books on Tacha's work:

- Athena Tacha: Public Sculpture (1982), with introductory essays by Ellen H. Johnson and Theodore Wolff
- Forms of Chaos: Drawings by Athena Tacha (1988)
- Elizabeth McClelland, Cosmic Rhythms: Athena Tacha's Public Sculpture (1998), in conjunction with an exhibition of the same title at the Beck Center for the Arts in Cleveland
- Dancing in the Landscape: The Sculpture of Athena Tacha (2000), with an introduction by Harriet Senie and over 200 color reproductions.
- Visualizing the Universe. Athena Tacha's Proposals for Public Art Commissions, 1972-2012 (2017), ed. Richard E. Spear, introduction by Glenn Harper and Twylene Moyer.
- Fifty Years Inside an Artist's Mind: The Journal of Athena Tacha (2020), 780 pp., edited with introduction by Richard E. Spear, Washington, D.C., 2020, ISBN 9781098326708.
- Richard E. Spear, The Art of Athena Tacha. A Complete Catalogue (2022), 200 pp., introduction by Syrago Tsiara, Washington, D.C. ISBN 978-1-66785-962-0.

Main solo exhibition catalogs:

- Athena Tacha: Public Works, 1970-88 (2009), with an introductory essay by Catherine M. Howett and John Howett, High Museum of Art, Atlanta, GA
- Athena Tacha: New Works, 1986-89 (1989), Cleveland Center for Contemporary Art, with an introductory essay by Thalia Gouma-Peterson
- Athena Tacha: Small Wonders - New Sculptures and Photoworks (2006), with introductory essays by Anne Ellegood and Brenda Brown, American University Museum, Katzen Arts Center, Washington, DC, Sept.6-Oct.29, 2006
- Athena Tacha: From Public to Private (2010), a bilingual catalogue for a traveling 40-year retrospective, with essays by Katerina Koskina and Syrago Tsiara, CACT (State Museum of Modern Art), Thessaloniki, Greece

Several of Tacha's New York exhibitions have illustrated catalogues -- Massacre Memorials (Max Hutchinson, 1984), with an essay by Lucy Lippard; Vulnerability: New Fashions (Franklin Furnace, 1994), a conceptual art piece critiquing the fashion industry; and Athena Tacha: Shields and Universes (Foundation for Hellenic Culture, 2001).
