= Ellen H. Johnson =

American historian

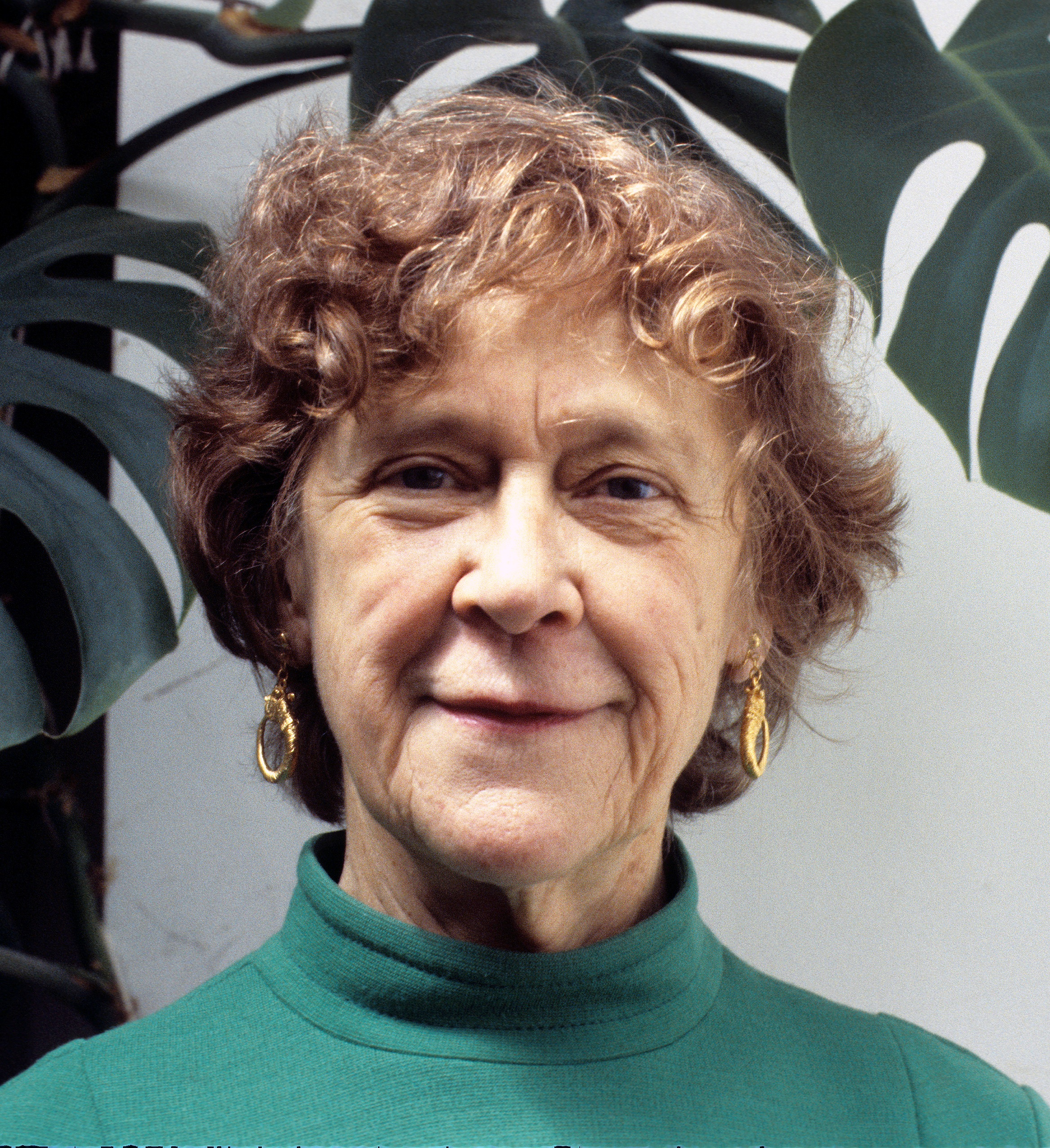
- Johnson after her retirement from Oberlin College.
- Born: Ellen Hulda Johnson; 1910; Warren, Pennsylvania
- Died: 1992 (aged 81–82)

Ellen Hulda Johnson (1910–1992) was an American art historian and professor of modern art at Oberlin College from 1945 to 1977, an organizer of important exhibitions, and an influential critic of contemporary American art.

== Early life and career ==
Ellen Hulda Johnson was born in 1910 in Warren, Pennsylvania, the daughter of Swedish immigrants Jacob Augustus Johnson, a hotel owner, and Hulda Headlund Johnson. Johnson entered Oberlin College as an undergraduate, receiving her bachelor's degree in 1933 and her master's degree in art history in 1935. She also studied at Columbia University, Uppsala University in Sweden, and the Sorbonne, Paris.

Johnson joined the Toledo Museum of Art in 1936 as the librarian and a member in the department of education. In 1939, she returned to Oberlin as an art librarian and part-time art history instructor. The following year she raised funds for a rental collection of original works of art for students at Oberlin, including prints from older painters such as Rembrandt to more modern ones such as Picasso. This type of collection remains an important program administered by Oberlin's Allen Memorial Art Museum.

== Full-time work at Oberlin ==
Johnson was promoted to full-time instructor in 1945, full professor in 1964, and honorary curator of modern art at the Allen Art Museum in 1973.

Although Johnson was never officially a curator, she became a member of the Allen's acquisition committee in 1947 and advised Oberlin's curators in organizing a biennial exhibition known as the Three Young Americans. Over the years, it showed first the black-striped paintings that established Frank Stella’s reputation, and subsequently featured the work of Robert Rauschenberg, Joan Mitchell, Claes Oldenburg, Bruce Nauman, Chuck Close, Jackie Winsor and many other young artists.

Although an acknowledged scholar of Cézanne, Picasso, Munch, Kensett and other modern masters, by 1960 Johnson was teaching a college course on "Art Since 1945". In 1962 she wrote the first important article on Claes Oldenburg, and in 1970, with curator of modern art Athena Tacha, she commissioned his first permanent large sculpture (3-Way Plug) for the grounds of the Allen. Gradually, with support from her friend and classmate Ruth Coates Roush, she built for the Allen a substantial collection of contemporary art.

Among many other distinctions and awards, Johnson was the commissioner of the U.S. for the first India Triennale of Contemporary Art in New Delhi in 1968. That same year she purchased the Frank Lloyd Wright-designed Weltzheimer house (1948–1950) in Oberlin, and spent a considerable part of her time and money restoring the building, where she lived the rest of her life.

Her lectures on modern art became so popular that they had to be held in the college's largest auditorium. In 1975, the Allen's director, Richard Spear, was able to draw upon her international reputation to solicit gifts from many major artists and organize a benefit auction at Sotheby's, in New York, in order to raise funds for the museum's new wing designed by Robert Venturi; the wing is named in honor of Johnson.

== Later years ==
Johnson's retirement from Oberlin College in 1977 was followed by an invitation to give the Power series of lectures in Australia, and by a visiting professorship at the University of California, Santa Barbara, in 1978. Her anthology, American Artists on Art, appeared in 1982, the same year as the catalog of her retrospective of Eva Hesse’s drawings for the Oberlin museum. During the last years of her life, Johnson wrote a memoir, Fragments Recalled at Eighty.

Ellen Johnson died of cancer in 1992, just after the Allen Art Museum opened an exhibition of her art collection, which was bequeathed to the museum. Her Frank Lloyd Wright house she bequeathed to Oberlin College. Her research papers and photographs are in the Archives of American Art, Washington, DC.

== Selected books ==
- Modern painting and its traditional aspects. Thesis (M.A.)--Oberlin College, 1935.
- Oberlin's modern art collection, [Oberlin, Ohio, 1944].
- Claes Oldenburg, [Baltimore, Penguin Books, 1971]. Series: Penguin new art, 4.
- Modern Art and the Object: a Century of Changing Attitudes, Thames & Hudson, 1976. Revised and enlarged edition, Harper Collins, New York, 1993.
- American Artists on Art from 1940 to 1980, Harper & Row, New York, 1982.
- Eva Hesse, a Retrospective of the Drawings, Allen Memorial Art Museum, Oberlin, Ohio, 1982.
- Fragments Recalled at Eighty: the Art Memoirs of Ellen H. Johnson (Athena Tacha, editor), Gallerie Publications, North Vancouver, BC, 1993.
