= The Cardsharps =

Painting by Caravaggio

- I bari (Italian)
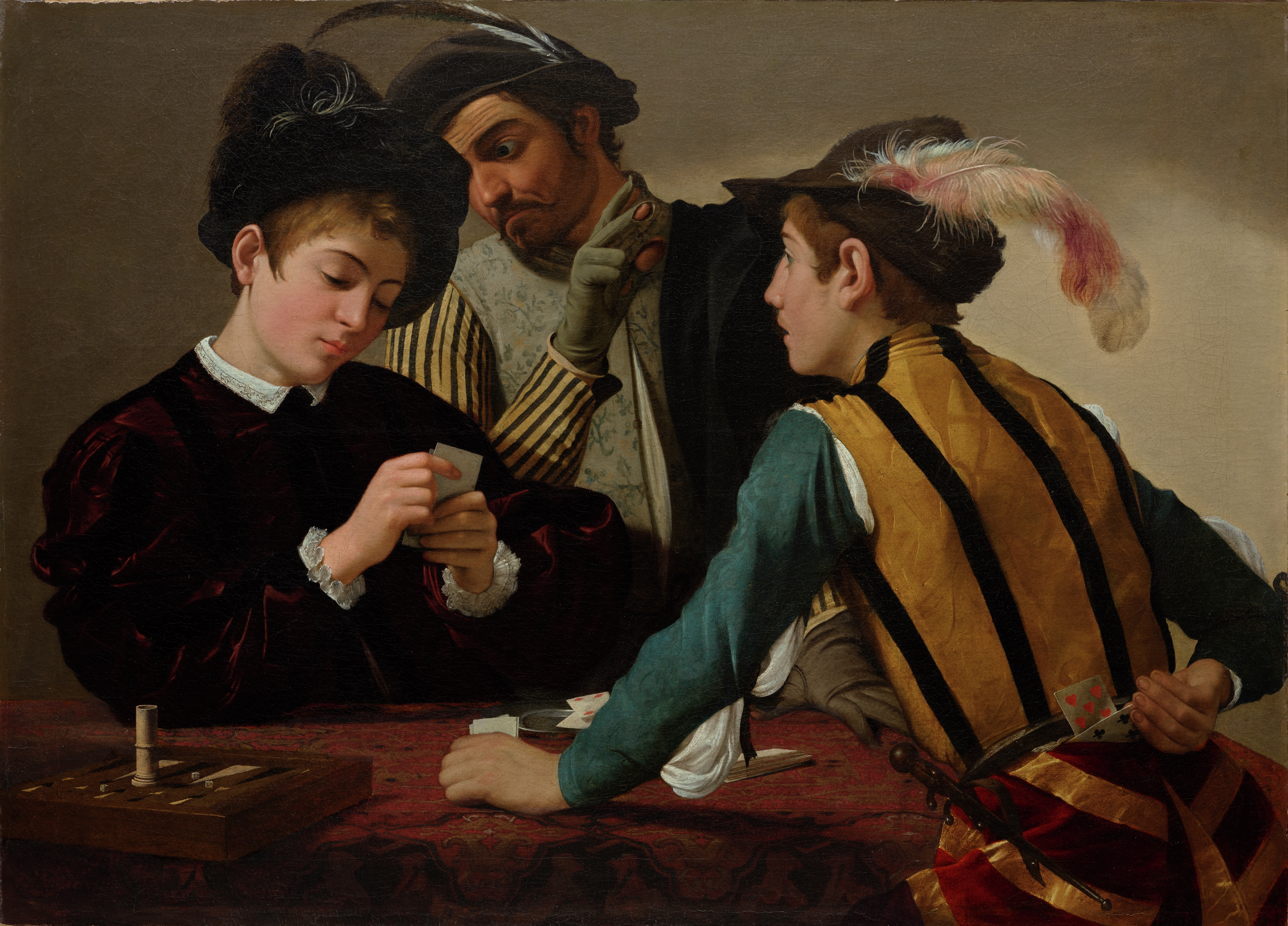
- Artist: Caravaggio
- Year: c. 1596–1597
- Medium: Oil on canvas
- Dimensions: 94.2 cm × 130.9 cm (37.1 in × 51.5 in)
- Location: Kimbell Art Museum, Fort Worth

The Cardsharps (Italian: I bari) is a c. 1596–1597 painting by the Italian Baroque artist Caravaggio. The original is generally agreed to be the work acquired by the Kimbell Art Museum in 1987, although Caravaggio may have painted more than one version.

== History ==
The work represents an important milestone for Caravaggio. He painted it when he was attempting an independent career after leaving the workshop of the Cavaliere Giuseppe Cesari d'Arpino, for whom he had been painting "flowers and fruit", finishing the details for the Cavaliere's mass-produced (and massive) output. Caravaggio left Arpino's workshop in January 1594 and began selling works through the dealer Costantino, with the assistance of Prospero Orsi, an established painter of Mannerist grotesques. Orsi introduced Caravaggio to his extensive network of contacts in the world of collectors and patrons.

== Composition ==
The painting shows an expensively dressed but unworldly boy playing cards with another boy. The second boy, a cardsharp, has extra cards tucked in his belt behind his back, out of sight of the mark but not the viewer, and a sinister older man is peering over the dupe's shoulder and signaling to his young accomplice. The second boy has a dagger handy at his side.

It was the second such painting Caravaggio created. The first, The Fortune Teller, had drawn attention, and this painting extended his reputation, small though it was at this stage. The subjects of The Fortune Teller and Cardsharps offered something new: realistic scenes of street life, highlighted by the attention to little details such as the split fingers on the older man's gloves, or the teenage cheat's anxious glance at his master. The composition is balanced, the three figures bound together by the common drama, yet each with his own unique interaction within the image as a whole – for if the innocent is being duped, the other boy is no older, another innocent being corrupted even as he cheats his gull.

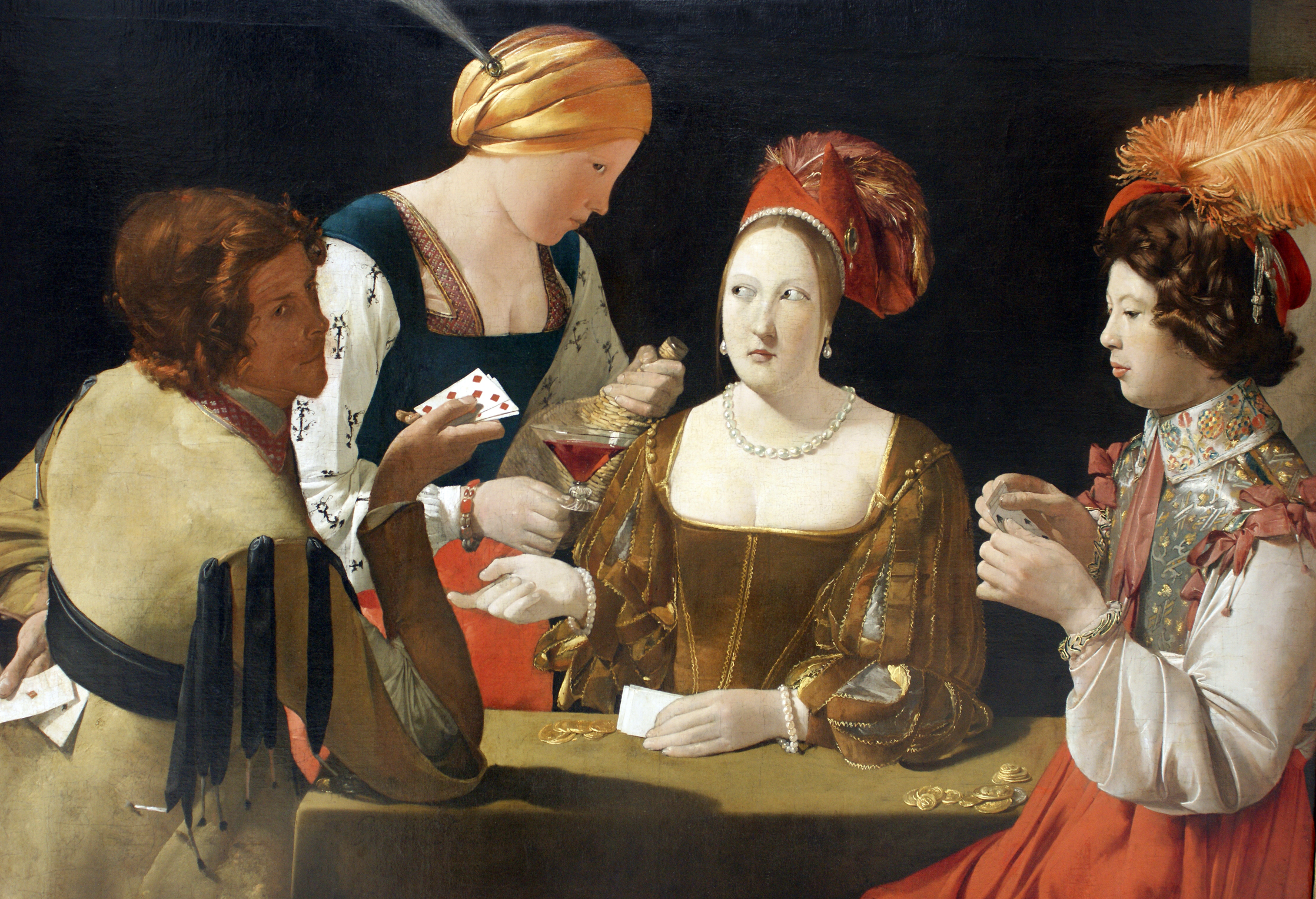
The Cardsharp with the Ace of Diamonds by Georges de La Tour, c. 1620–1640.

The Cardsharps, with its mixture of brutal low-life realism and luminous Venetian delicacy, was much admired, and Orsi "went around acclaiming (Caravaggio's) new style and heightening the reputation of his work." Caravaggio appears to have produced more than one version of the work (as discussed in the provenance section below). Over 50 copies and variants made by other painters have survived, with artists such as Georges de La Tour painting their own appreciations of the theme.

== Provenance ==
Whether through Costantino or Orsi, Caravaggio came to the notice of the prominent collector Cardinal Francesco Maria del Monte, who purchased Cardsharps and became the artist's first important patron, giving him lodgings in his Palazzo Madama behind the Piazza Navona, then as now one of the principal squares in Rome.

From del Monte's collection the work entered the collection of Cardinal Antonio Barberini, nephew of the Pope Urban VIII (whose pre-elevation portrait, Portrait of Maffeo Barberini, Caravaggio would paint in 1598), in Rome. It passed by descent to his nephew Maffeo Barberini, Prince of Palestrina, and then through the Colonna-Sciarra family. It eventually disappeared in the 1890s, and was rediscovered in 1987 in a private collection in Zürich; it was subsequently sold to and is currently in the collection of the Kimbell Art Museum in Fort Worth, Texas.

The British art historian Sir Denis Mahon acquired a copy of Cardsharps at auction in 2006. Although it had been sold by Sotheby's as being a copy of the work in the Kimbell Art Museum and by an artist other than Caravaggio, Mahon argued that it was a replica by Caravaggio himself. There is a pentimento, in which full detail of the face of one of the cheats had been sketched in spite of being painted over by the page's hat. This suggests that it is unlikely that it was done by a copy artist. The attribution of this version to Caravaggio has been widely accepted, although in 2014 it became the subject of a legal dispute, Thwaytes v Sotheby's. This suggested that Caravaggio might have painted at least two versions of the work, as he is believed to have done with Boy Bitten by a Lizard, The Fortune Teller, and The Lute Player. Mahon died in 2011 and the painting had been loaned to London's Museum of the Order of St John and insured for £10,000,000. On 16 January 2015 the High Court of England and Wales ruled in favor of Sotheby's, saying that, relying on qualified experts, Sotheby's had reasonably come to the view that the painting was not likely a Caravaggio; the judge consequently ordered the plaintiff, Lancelot Thwaytes, to pay Sotheby's £1.8 million for its legal fees.

== See also ==
- List of paintings by Caravaggio
