= The Rape of Europa (Reni) =

Painting by Guido Reni

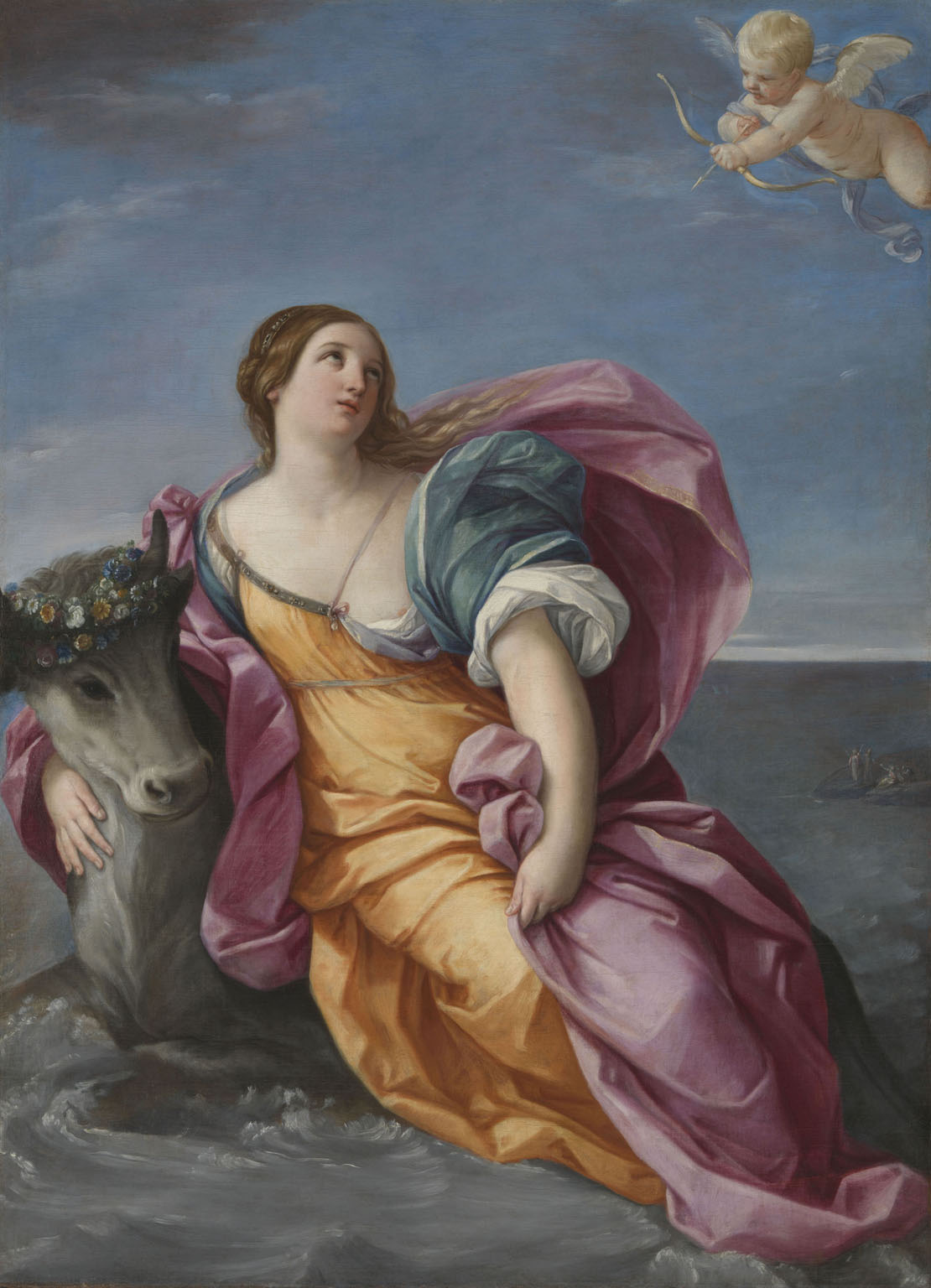
- Artist: Guido Reni
- Year: 1637–1639
- Medium: Oil on canvas
- Location: National Gallery; London; 52°21′30.30″N 4°52′51.90″E
- Owner: Estate of Denis Mahon

The Rape of Europa is a painting commissioned by Władysław IV Vasa from the Italian artist Guido Reni, completed between 1637 and 1639 and showing the abduction of Europa by Zeus in the form of a bull. It was later collected by Denis Mahon, who loaned it to the National Gallery, to which it was presented in 2013 by the Trustees of Sir Denis Mahon's Charitable Trust through the Art Fund.

== Sources ==
- "The Rape of Europa". www.nationalgallery.org.uk.
