= Denis Mahon =

British Italian art collector and historian

Sir Denis Mahon
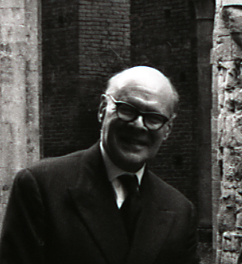
- Mahon in 1980
- Born: John Denis Mahon; 8 November 1910; London, England
- Died: 24 April 2011 (aged 100); 33 Cadogan Square, London, England
- Occupations: Art collector and historian

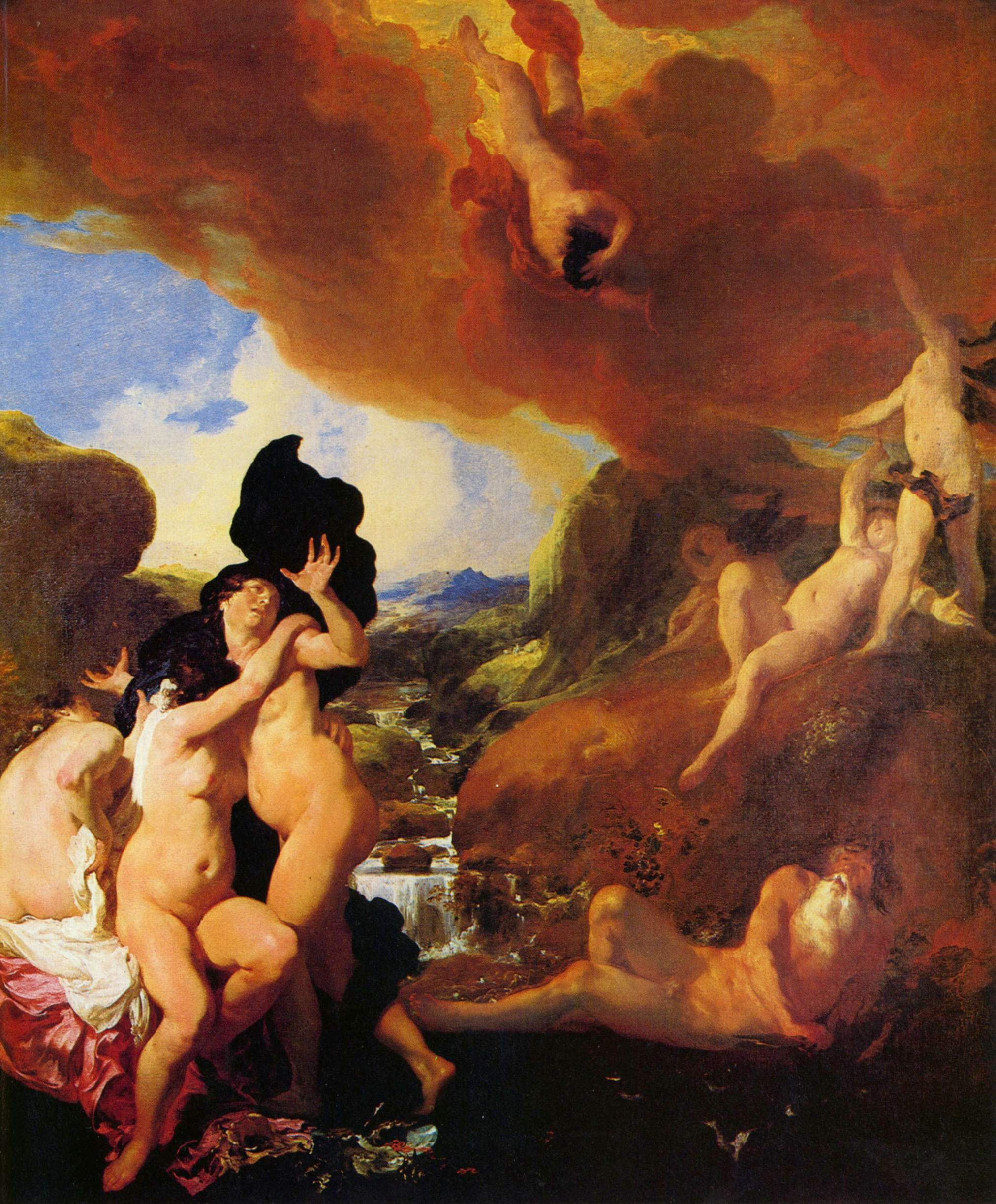
The Fall of Phaeton (c. 1624) by Johann Liss. Denis Mahon collection (on loan to the National Gallery, London)

Sir John Denis Mahon, CH, CBE, FBA (8 November 1910 – 24 April 2011) was a British collector and historian of Italian art. Considered to be one of the few art collectors who was also a respected scholar, he is generally credited, alongside Sacheverell Sitwell and Tancred Borenius, with bringing Italian pre-Baroque and Baroque painters to the attention of English-speaking audiences, reversing the critical aversion to their work that had prevailed from the time of John Ruskin.

== Biography ==
Born in London into a wealthy Anglo-Irish family, his father John FitzGerald Mahon (fourth son of Sir William Vesey Ross Mahon, 4th Baronet (1813–1893), was a member of the family that had prospered from the Guinness Mahon merchant bank fortune; and the grandson, through his mother Lady Alice Evelyn Browne, of Henry Browne, 5th Marquess of Sligo. After attending Ludgrove School, Eton College, he went to Christ Church, University of Oxford, where he received an MA.

A lover of opera, he decided not to enter the family business but study art, spending a year working at the Ashmolean Museum under the supervision of Kenneth Clark. Clark then suggested him to his friend Nikolaus Pevsner, who had just joined the newly formed Courtauld Institute of Art in London. Pevsner introduced Mahon to Italian Mannerist and Baroque painting, and also gave him private tuition.

Mahon bought his first artwork, Guercino's Jacob Blessing the Sons of Joseph in 1934 in Paris for £120. He subsequently met art historian Otto Kurz, whom he frequently used as an Italian translator, in the late 1930s, and together they travelled to Stalinist Russia to study Italian masters.

In 1936, Mahon began a long association with the National Gallery. Serving as an honorary attaché (informal, unpaid curator), he offered to buy Guercino's Elijah Fed By Ravens from the Barberini collection in Rome, and then sell it to the Gallery. However, Clark who was now the Gallery's Director, felt that it would be impossible to persuade the trustees of the merits of buying an Italian baroque painting. As a result, Mahon decided to form his own collection, holding the pieces until such time as the national collections would be interested in them. Mahon later twice served as a trustee of the National Gallery (1957–64; 1966–73), he was instrumental in pushing through important acquisitions, including Reni's Adoration of the Shepherds and with fellow trustee the sculptor Henry Moore, Caravaggio's Salome Receives the Head of St John the Baptist.

Mahon's Studies in Seicento Art and Theory, a series of essays promoting Italian art of the 17th century, was published in 1947. In the 1960s, Mahon and Sir Anthony Blunt became embroiled in a public feud over the iconography of the paintings of Nicolas Poussin, a subject in which both had published extensively and were recognised experts.

In the 1970s he came into disagreement with Edward Heath's Paymaster General, David Eccles, who proposed charging for museum entry. This came to a head in 1970 when Mahon attempted to pay the capital taxes on his deceased mother's estate by offering The Coronation of the Virgin by Annibale Carracci from his collection. Worth substantially more than the taxes payable, after HM Treasury declined to credit Mahon with the difference, in 1971 he sold it to the Metropolitan Museum, New York.

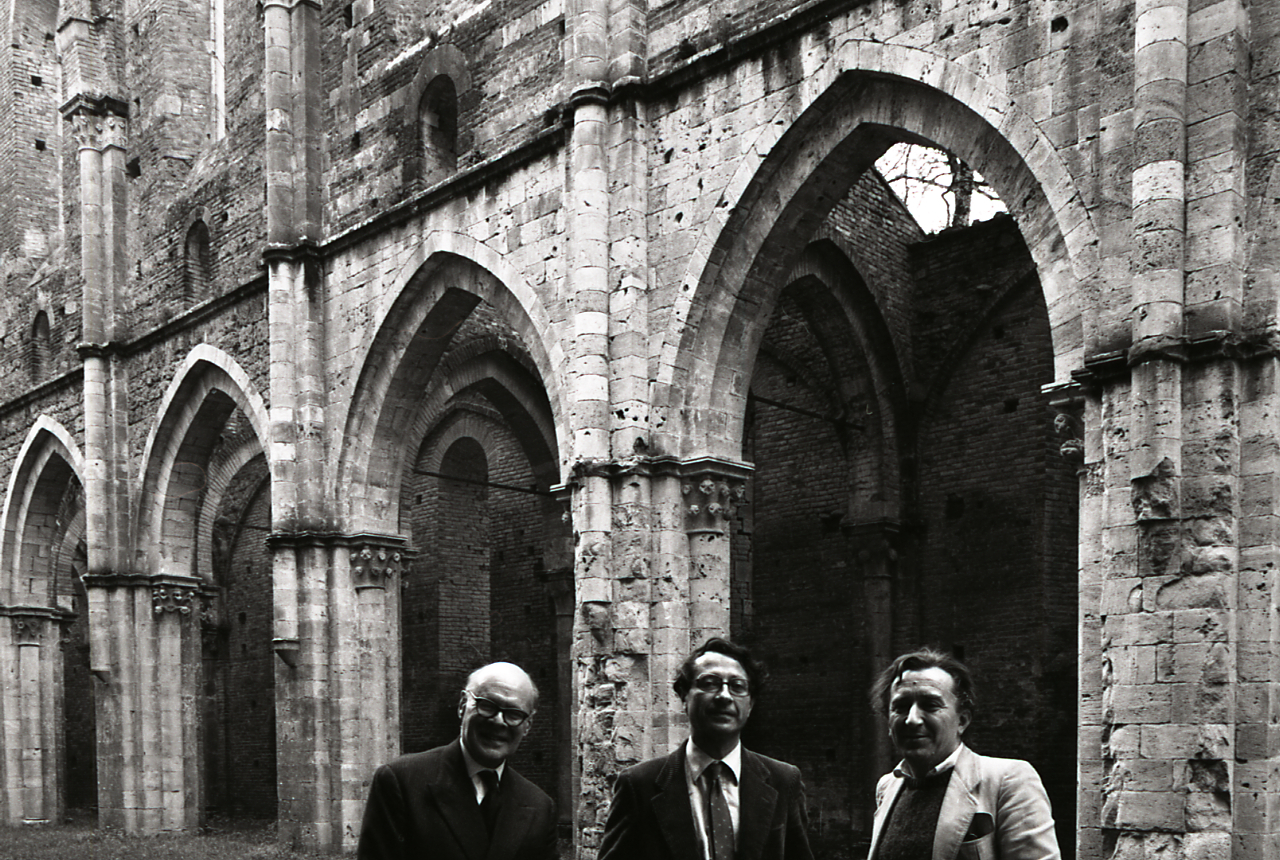
Mahon (left) with Andrea Emiliani and Pierluigi Cervellati, photographed by Paolo Monti in the San Galgano Abbey, Chiusdino (Italy), 1980.

In the 1990s, Mahon donated his entire 57 piece art collection to various museums in the UK, the Pinacoteca Nazionale in Bologna and the National Gallery of Ireland in Dublin. In December 2007, a painting Mahon bought for £50,400 the previous year (and which was considered to be the work of an anonymous follower of Caravaggio) was authenticated by him as a true Caravaggio. It is an early version of the painting The Cardsharps. Mahon turned 100 in November 2010.

Mahon authenticated two versions of Caravaggio's The Taking of Christ as original: one in the National Gallery of Ireland in 1993, and the other in Florence in 2004. Jonathan Harr disputes the later attribution, ascribing it to Mahon's advanced age. Mahon authenticated two further versions of Caravaggio in collaboration with Luigi Salerno, Martha and Mary Magdalene, acquired by the Detroit Institute of Arts in 1973, and The Crucifixion of Saint Andrew, acquired by the Cleveland Museum of Art in 1976.

Mahon lived at 33 Cadogan Square, London. He died on 24 April 2011, aged 100.

== Awards ==
Mahon was appointed a Commander of the Order of the British Empire (CBE) in 1967, and knighted in 1986. He was made a Member of the Order of the Companions of Honour (CH) in 2002 for his services to art, and received honorary doctorates from the universities of Newcastle, Oxford, Rome and Bologna.

In 1957 Mahon was awarded the Medal for Benemeriti della Cultura by the Italian president, for services to criticism and history of Italian art. In 1982 he was made an honorary citizen of Cento, Guercino's birthplace. Denis Mahon was very close to Luigi Salerno and was his consultant for his book on Guercino, the source of this information is obviously the book titled I DIPINTI DEL GUERCINO, UGO BOZZI editor, 1988. author Luigi Salerno Consulenza scientifica di Denis Mahon.

Made a fellow of the British Academy in 1964, it awarded him its Serena Medal for Italian Studies in 1972. In 1996 he was made an honorary student of Christ Church, Oxford.

== Legacy ==
In the 1990s, Mahon lent his entire 57 piece art collection to various museums in the UK, the Pinacoteca Nazionale in Bologna and the National Gallery of Ireland in Dublin. The loans included: 25 to the National Gallery, London; 12 to the Ashmolean Museum, Oxford; 8 to the National Gallery of Scotland, Edinburgh; 6 to the Fitzwilliam Museum, Cambridge; 5 to the Birmingham Art Gallery; 1 to Temple Newsam House, Leeds.

In a complex legal arrangement via his personal charitable trust, a number of these paintings (such as The Rape of Europa) are on permanent loan from the Art Fund, which owns them. There are two conditions to the loans: that the museums in question never deaccession any of their works; or charge for admission. If either condition is broken, the paintings could be withdrawn from the museums.

In 2010, Mahon donated his entire library and archive to the National Gallery of Ireland.

After his death, the trustees of the charitable trust under instruction from Mahon's Will offered to donate the pieces to the national collection for free via the Art Fund, subject to the same conditions under which they were originally loaned. If these conditions were broken, then the art's owner the Art Fund could ask for their immediate return. He also left the Art Fund a further £1 million cash bequest.
