= Richard E. Spear =

American art historian

- Born: 1940 (age 85–86); Michigan City, Indiana

Academic background
- Education: University of Chicago, Princeton University

Academic work
- Discipline: Art historian
- Institutions: Oberlin College; Allen Memorial Art Museum; George Washington University; University of Florida, Gainesville; University of Maryland, College Park
- Main interests: Italian Baroque painting

Richard E. Spear (born 1940 in Michigan City, Indiana) is an American art historian and professor who specializes in Italian Baroque painting. In 1965 he married artist Athena Tacha.

== Education and academic career ==
Spear was educated in art history at the University of Chicago (B.A., 1961) and Princeton University (Ph.D., 1965). His research and publications have focused on seventeenth-century European art, ranging from a two-volume catalogue raisonné on Domenichino (1581–1641) to studies based on iconographic, psychoanalytic, feminist, and economic methodologies. He taught at Oberlin College from 1965 until 2000, where he also directed the Allen Memorial Art Museum (1972–83). He was appointed distinguished visiting professor at George Washington University in 1983–84 and held the Harn Eminent Scholar Chair at the University of Florida, Gainesville, in 1997–98. Since 1998, he has been distinguished visiting and affiliated research professor at the University of Maryland, College Park.

== Main publications and research ==
- Caravaggio and his Followers, Cleveland Museum of Art, 1971, rev. ed., Harper & Row, New York, 1975
- Renaissance and Baroque Paintings from the Sciarra and Fiano Collections, The Pennsylvania State University Press and Ugo Bozzi, Rome, 1972
- Domenichino, Yale University Press, New Haven and London, 1982
- Domenichino, 1581-1641 (exhibition catalogue), Palazzo Venezia, Rome, 1996, pp. 163–69, 368–473
- The "Divine" Guido: Religion, Sex, Money and Art in the World of Guido Reni, Yale University Press, New Haven and London, 1997
- From Caravaggio to Artemisia: Essays on Painting in Seventeenth-Century Italy and France, The Pindar Press, London, 2002
- Painting for Profit: the Economic Lives of Seventeenth-Century Italian Painters (with Philip Sohm), Yale University Press, New Haven and London, 2010
- Dipingere per profitto. Le vite economiche dei pittori nella Roma del Seicento, Campisano, Rome, 2016
- (editor) Visualizing the Universe: Athena Tacha's Proposals for Public Art Commissions 1972-2012, Grayson, Washington, D.C., 2017
- (editor) Fifty Years Inside an Artist's Mind: The Journal of Athena Tacha, Owl Press, Washington, D.C., 2020
- Caravaggio's 'Cardsharps' on Trial: Thwaytes v. Sotheby's, The Burlington Press, London, 2020
- The Art of Athena Tacha. A Complete Catalogue, Owl Press, Washington, D.C. 2022

Spear's research on prices paid to painters in seventeenth-century Rome is a searchable online database administered by the Getty Research Institute. In addition to nearly 100 articles on Baroque art (see From Caravaggio to Artemisia: Essays on Painting in Seventeenth-Century Italy and France, pp. 601–06, for a complete bibliography through 2002), he has published studies on the European painting collection in the Prince of Wales Museum, Bombay, India, and written for the Times Literary Supplement, The Artnewspaper, The Washington Post, and The International Herald Tribune. He was editor-in-chief of The Art Bulletin from 1985 to 1988.

== Distinctions and awards ==
Spear was art historian in residence at the American Academy in Rome in 1988. He received many research grants, including a post-doctoral Fulbright scholarship to Italy (1966–67), and fellowships from the American Council of Learned Societies (1971–72), the National Endowment for the Humanities (1980–81), the Center for Advanced Study in the Visual Arts of the National Gallery of Art in Washington, D.C. (1983–84), the Guggenheim Foundation (1987–88), and the National Humanities Center (1992–93). Twice he won a residency at the Rockefeller Foundation's Bellagio Center (1996, 2007). In 1972 he was awarded the Daria Borghese Gold Medal for the best book of the year dealing with a Roman subject.
