= Nadelman =

Nadelman is a surname. Notable people with the surname include:

- Elie Nadelman (1882–1946), American sculptor, draughtsman and art collector
- Leonia Nadelman (1909–2003), Polish painter and illustrator
- Stefan Nadelman (born 1972), American film director and animator

== See also ==
- Ethan Nadelmann (born 1956), American drug policy reform activist and writer
- Noëmi Nadelmann (born 1962), Swiss soprano
