= The Crucifixion of Saint Andrew (Caravaggio) =

Painting by Caravaggio

- La Crocifissione di Sant'Andrea (Italian), La Crucifixión de San Andrés (Spanish)
- Artist: Caravaggio
- Year: 1607
- Medium: oil on canvas
- Dimensions: 202.5 cm × 152.7 cm (79.7 in × 60.1 in)
- Location: Cleveland Museum of Art, Cleveland

The Crucifixion of Saint Andrew (1607) is a painting by the Italian Baroque master Caravaggio. It is in the collection of the Cleveland Museum of Art, which acquired it from the Arnaiz collection in Madrid in 1976, having been taken to Spain by the Spanish Viceroy of Naples in 1610.

The incident depicted, the martyrdom of Saint Andrew, was supposed to have taken place in Patras, Greece. The saint, bound to the cross with ropes, was said to have survived two days, preaching to the crowd and eventually converting them so that they demanded his release. When the Roman Proconsul Aegeas—depicted lower right—ordered him taken down, his men were struck by a miraculous paralysis, in answer to the saint's prayer that he be allowed to undergo martyrdom.

From the 17th century Saint Andrew was shown on a diagonal cross, but Caravaggio would have been influenced by the 16th century belief that he was crucified on a normal Latin cross.

== History ==
On 11 July 1610 Juan Alonso Pimentel de Herrera, 5th Duke of Benavente, left Naples for Spain, having served as viceroy of that city for seven years. With him he took a painting Giovanni Pietro Bellori described as "la Crocifissione di Santo Andrea". The painting was installed at the family palace in Valladolid, where it was appraised, in 1653, (Note: Archivo Histórico de Protocolos, Valladolid, España (Prot. 1.118)) at 1,500 ducats, by far the highest value painting in the family collection. The occasion for the appraisal came with the death of the 7th Duke of Benavente in December 1652.

The appraiser was Diego Valentín Díaz who described the work as "a large painting of a nude St Andrew when he is being put on the cross with three executioners and a woman, with an ebony frame" (Note: muy grande de pintura de san andres desnudo quando le estan poniendo en la cruz con tres sayones y una muger con moldura de ebano) and it is attributed to "micael angel caraballo". This painting was almost certainly commissioned by the viceroy, who was especially devoted to Saint Andrew and played a role in renovating the crypt of Saint Andrew in the Amalfi Cathedral.

The Valladolid painting is thought to be the same as the present work, acquired by the Cleveland Museum of Art in 1976. There are three other versions of the composition: one (198 x 147.5 cm) formerly part of the Back-Vega collection, Vienna, and now part of the Spier Collection, London, attributed to Caravaggio by some mid-20th century art historians such as Giuseppe Fiocco, Hermann Voss and Antonio Morassi, and considered a copy (by Louis Finson) by others, especially after the rediscovery of the version now in Cleveland in 1974. Since 2011, the former Back-Vega exemplar has again been attributed to Caravaggio, as a second version. The other two exemplars are undisputed copies: one (232.5 x 160 cm) at the Museo de Santa Cruz, Toledo (Spain), discovered by Roberto Longhi in 1920, which was much ruined during the Spanish Civil War and whose authorship is uncertain; the other one (209 x1 51.5 cm) at the Musée des Beaux-Arts de Dijon (France), long attributed to Abraham Vinck and considered to have been painted by Louis Finson since 2011. This specific version was first given to Caravaggio by Benedict Nicolson in 1974.

== See also ==
- List of paintings by Caravaggio

== Bibliography ==
- Benay, Erin (2017). Exporting Caravaggio: the Crucifixion of St. Andrew. ISBN 978-1911282242
- Gash, John (2004). Caravaggio. ISBN 1-904449-22-0.
