= Nativity with Angels (Parmigianino) =

Painting by Parmigianino

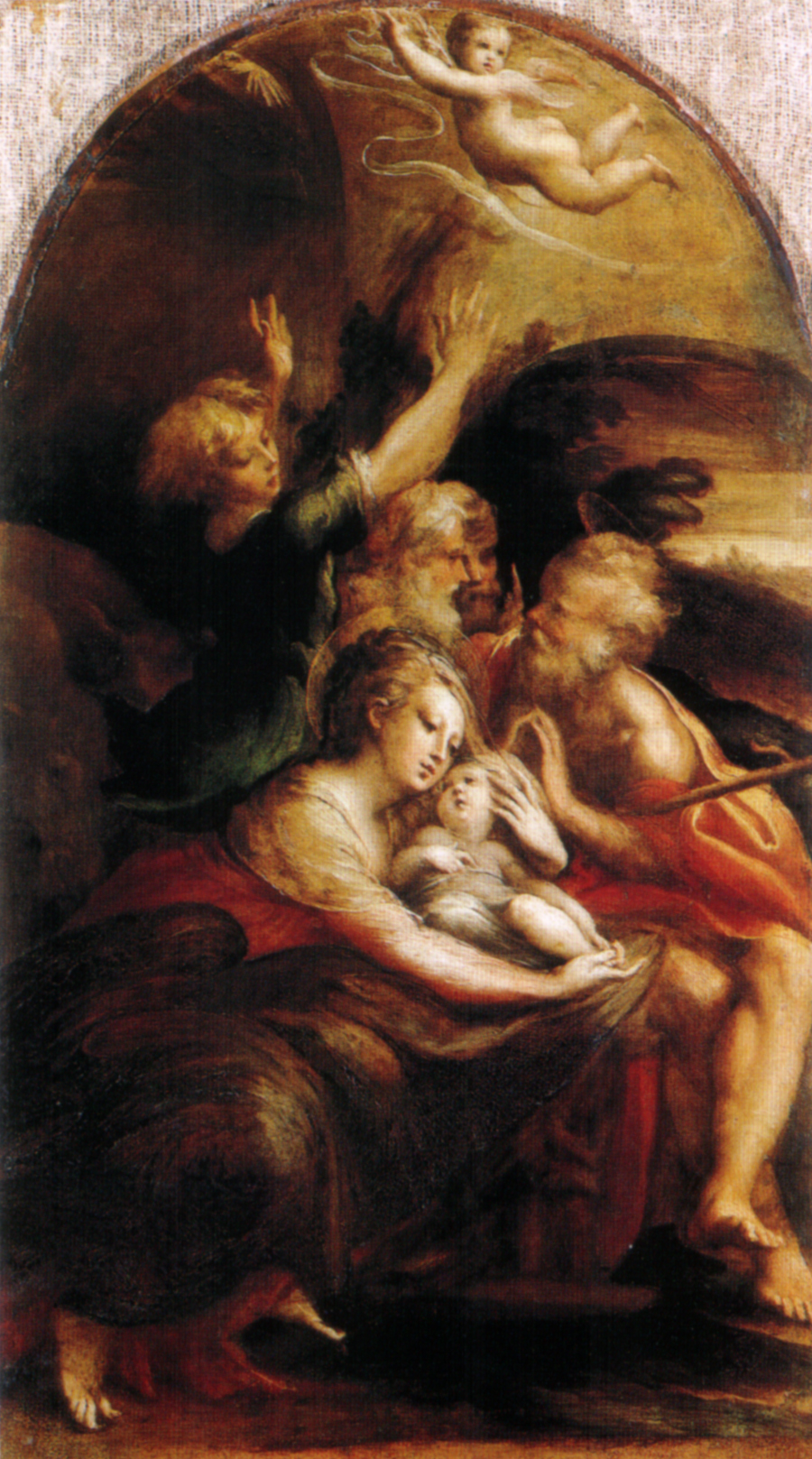
Nativity with Angels (c. 1525) by Parmigianino

Nativity with Angels is a c.1525 oil on panel painting by the Italian painter Parmigianino, now in the Galleria Doria-Pamphili, in Rome. Its shape and dimensions show it to form a diptych with the Doria Madonna in the same gallery.

It appears in Tonci's 1794 description of the Galleria Doria and may be the work mentioned in Vasari's Lives of the Artists as "Madonna and Child, some angels and a Saint Joseph" produced in Rome for Luigi Gaddi. These mentions and stylistic similarities to other early works such as Female Saint with Two Angels (Städel Museum) and the Fontanellato frescoes place it in his first years in Rome. The sfumato technique and complex orchestration of looks and gestures is reminiscent of Correggio, a strong influence on Parmigianino early in his career.
