= Portrait of a Thirty-Seven-Year-Old Gentleman =

c. 1543 painting by Lorenzo Lotto

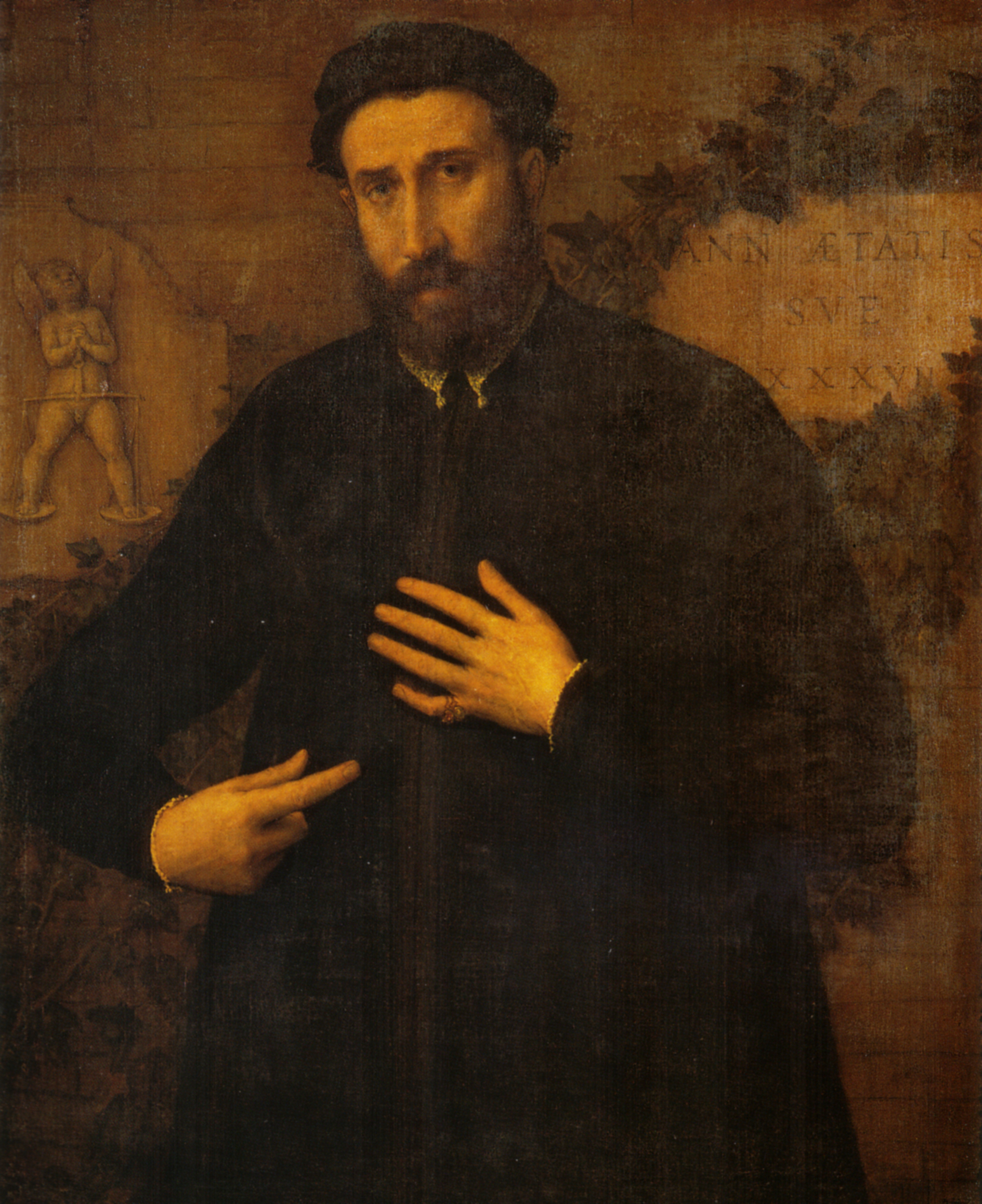
Portrait of a Thirty-Seven-Year-Old Gentleman (c. 1543) by Lorenzo Lotto

Portrait of a Thirty-Seven-Year-Old Gentleman is an oil-on-canvas portrait by the Italian High Renaissance artist Lorenzo Lotto, now in the Galleria Doria Pamphilj in Rome. It was previously interpreted as a 1517 self-portrait of the artist, but its style does not match Lotto's style of the 1510s. It is now dated to c. 1543 on the basis of stylistic similarities with works produced by the artist in the mid-1540s, such as Portrait of Febo da Brescia and Portrait of an Old Man with Gloves.

The subject is now unknown, but his age is given on a trompe-l'œil inscription to the right reading "Ann Aetatis Sue XXXVII". To the left is a bas-relief of a putto holding a set of scales, often used as a symbol of a man considering his passions – it also appears with that purpose in Lotto's Mystical Marriage of St Catherine of Alexandria and Saints (Palazzo Barberini, Rome). It may instead symbolise Libra or be the alchemical symbol of a melancholic man.
