= Portrait of an Old Man with Gloves =

c. 1543 painting by Lorenzo Lotto

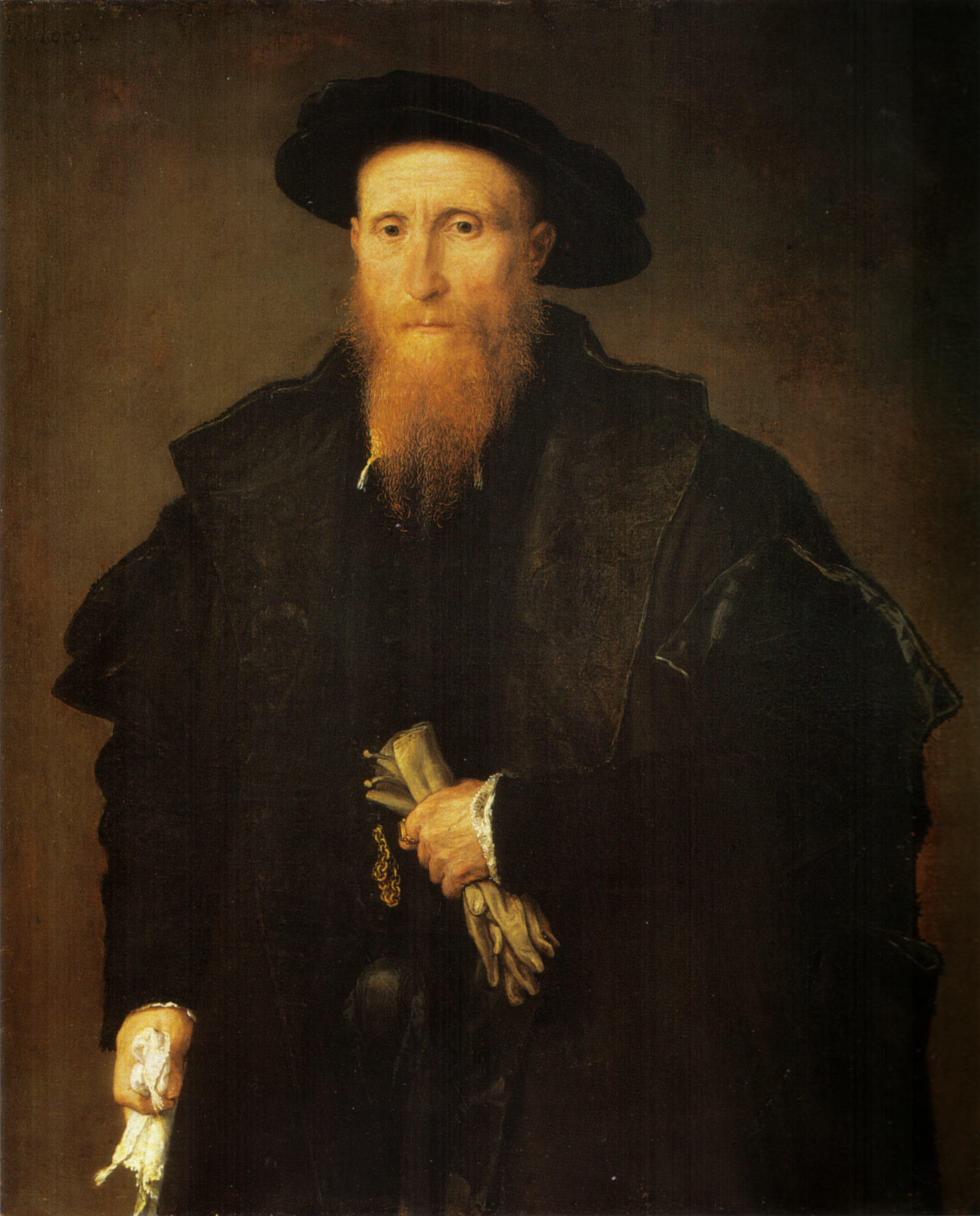
Portrait of an Old Man with Gloves (c. 1543) by Lorenzo Lotto

Portrait of an Old Man with Gloves is an oil-on-canvas painting by the Italian High Renaissance artist Lorenzo Lotto. It is assigned a date c.1543 on the basis of stylistic similarities with Portrait of Febo da Brescia, Portrait of a Thirty-Seven-Year-Old Gentleman and other works produced by the artist in the mid 1540s. Its final private owner was count Castellane Harrach of Turin, from whose collection it entered the Pinacoteca di Brera in Milan in 1859, where it still hangs.

Some art historians hold the subject to be Liberale da Pinedel, a portrait of whom was mentioned in Lotto's account books in 1543, shortly after the painter's arrival in Treviso, although Liberale would then only have been 47 or 48 years old, younger than the portrait's subject. The account books also mention portraits of the Mantuan Marcello Framberti and of Ludovico Avolante, the latter painted in 1544, both of whom are alternative candidates for Old Man.

The painting is signed "L. Loto" at the upper left.
