= Andrea Navagero =

Italian diplomat and writer (1483–1529)

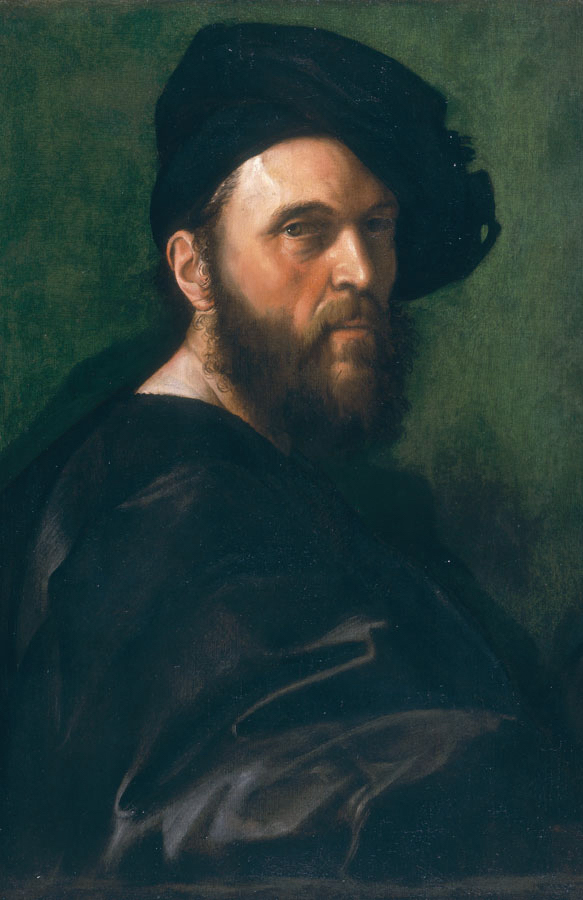
- Detail from Raphael's Portrait of Andrea Navagero and Agostino Beazzano, 1516
- Born: 1483; Venice, Republic of Venice
- Died: 8 May 1529 (aged 46); Blois, Kingdom of France
- Burial place: Murano, Italy
- Education: University of Padua
- Occupations: Diplomat; Librarian
- Known for: Funeral orations; Editions of classical manuscripts; Latin poetry; Ambassadorship to Spain and France

Andrea Navagero (1483 – 8 May 1529), known as Andreas Naugerius in Latin, was a Venetian diplomat and writer. Born to a wealthy family, he gained entry to the Great Council of Venice at the age of twenty, five years younger than was normal at the time. He dedicated himself to editing classical Latin manuscripts at the Aldine Press printing office, garnering a reputation as a scholar and a skilled writer. In 1515, at the request of the general Bartolomeo d'Alviano, he was appointed the caretaker of a library containing the collection of the scholar Bessarion; this library would later become the Biblioteca Marciana. At the same time, he was designated official historian of the Republic of Venice.

As a result of his high standing in Venetian scholarly circles, Navagero was named the Venetian ambassador to Spain in 1523 and navigated the volatile diplomatic climate caused by the conflict between Charles V – the Holy Roman emperor and king of Spain – and King Francis I of France. During this time, he provided many highly detailed descriptions of Spanish cities and landmarks. He was imprisoned by Charles in December 1526, but released in a prisoner exchange the following April; before returning home to Venice, he traveled to Paris to acquaint himself with the royal court of Francis.

By the time Navagero arrived back in Venice in September 1528, he had grown disillusioned with politics and wished to return to editing manuscripts and cultivating his prized gardens. Much to his dismay, he was appointed ambassador to France in January 1529. After traveling through the Alps to meet Francis I in Blois, he fell gravely ill and died on 8 May 1529.

== Early life and education ==
Navagero was born in 1483 to the wealthy Navagero family. The Navagero family were among the younger case nuove, or "new houses", of the Venetian nobility, as opposed to the more established "old houses". His father was Bernardo Navagero, a captain in the Venetian navy, and his mother was Lucrezia Bolani. He also had two brothers, Bartolomeo and Pietro. The geographer and writer Giovanni Battista Ramusio was Navagero's distant cousin; Navagero would become one of Ramusio's closest friends.

Navagero was first educated by private tutors before attending the University of Padua; he attended the university in at least the years 1501 and 1502. Pietro Pompanazzi tutored him in philosophy; he was also taught Latin by Marcantonio Sabellico and Greek by Marcus Musurus. Navagero followed the humanist school of thought, which, during the Renaissance, was centered on the study of classical philosophy, literature, and history. He also subscribed to Epicureanism, a hedonistic philosophy encouraging the pursuit of mental pleasures, such as peace of mind and freedom from pain and fear. This manifested in his desire to remain constantly in his gardens, which he loved deeply. While in Rome in 1516, Navagero attended Roman academy meetings, which were convivial social gatherings of Italy's learned men of the time.

== Career ==
In 1504, Navagero gained entry to the chief political assembly of Venice, the Great Council, at the age of twenty, five years younger than the typical age at the time. Although members of Venice's noble families were automatically granted a seat in the Great Council at the age of 25, it was possible to gain early admission through a yearly lottery among the younger noblemen. Many of his contemporaries believed that he had the potential to become a successful politician. He delivered a funeral oration for Catherine Cornaro, a Venetian and the final queen of Cyprus, after her death in Venice in 1510, though the content of this oration has not survived. At some point, Navagero took residence in a villa in Murano, where he maintained an impressive garden.

Despite his election to the Great Council, Navagero devoted much of his time to editing manuscripts of classical Latin works at the Aldine Press printing office, garnering a reputation as a scholar and a skilled writer. With the Aldine Press, he published editions of the works of the ancient Roman writers Cicero, Quintilian, and Virgil in 1514, Lucretius in 1515, Ovid in 1515 and 1516, and Terence in 1517. He was highly proficient in Latin and Greek and deeply knowledgeable about classical literature.

Navagero was also a prolific Latin poet, though he destroyed some of his own works as they did not meet his rigorous standards. In one instance, he cast some of his own poems into a fire after a reader compared them to Statius's Silvae, a work written in a "Silver Age" Latin style that Navagero personally disliked. In another, he destroyed multiple poems that he wrote in the heroic meter because he was not satisfied with their quality. Most of his surviving poems were composed while he was still a young man; the earliest, and the only one that appeared in print during his lifetime, was published in 1499, when he was sixteen. A collection of his Latin poems called the Lusus (lit. 'diversions') was published posthumously in 1530; according to the preface, the texts were taken from rough drafts and copies that Navigero had circulated privately among his friends. Beyond the Lusus, he also produced Italian vernacular poetry, though he destroyed many of these works as well.

=== Military service and library administration ===
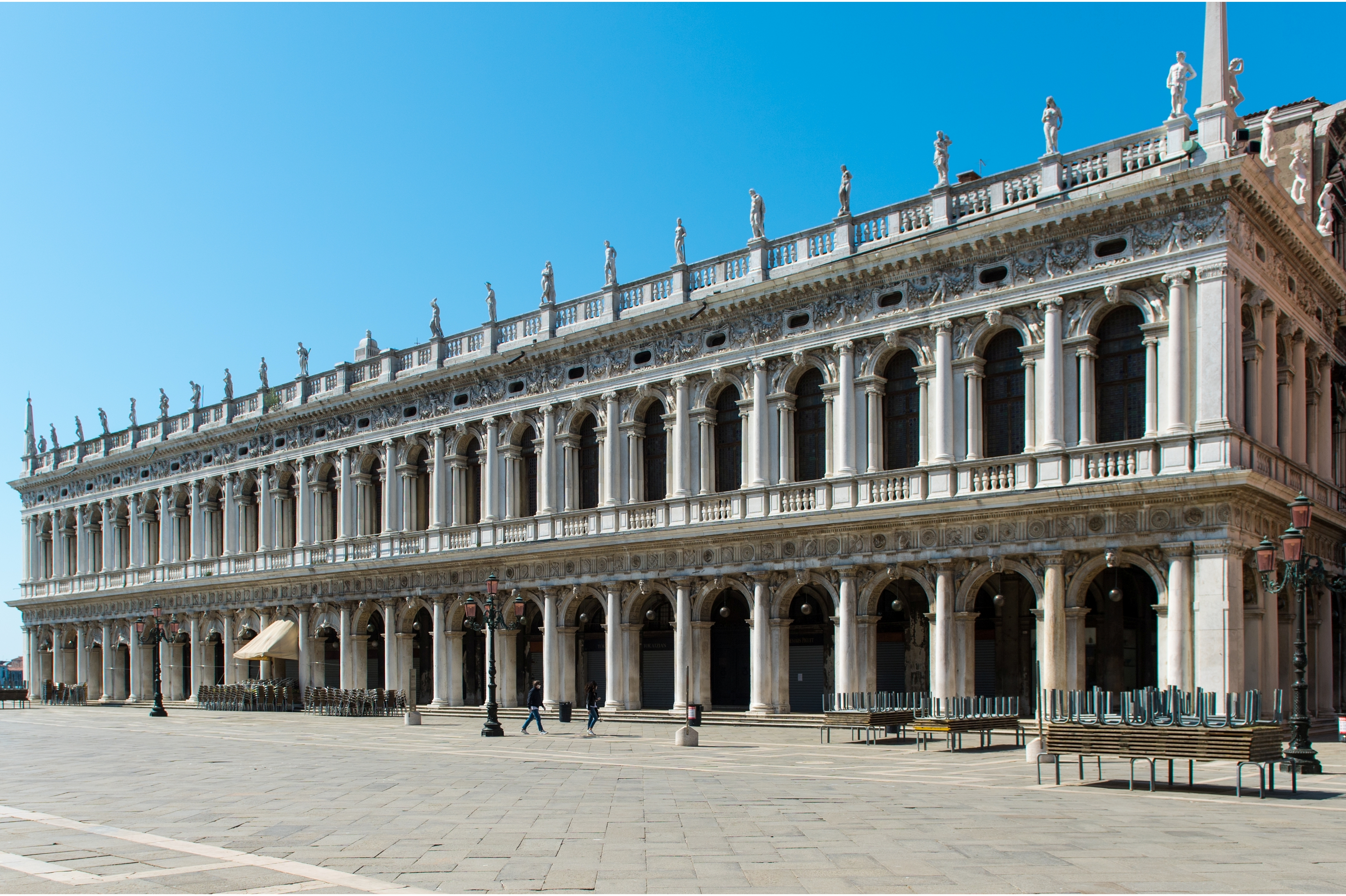
Biblioteca Marciana

Navagero joined the ranks of the Venetian general Bartolomeo d'Alviano's army following the League of Cambrai's 1508 declaration of war against the Venetian Republic. He earned the admiration of Alviano for both his literary skill and bravery. He became a member of literary academy sponsored by Alviano at Pordenone, northeast of Venice, and among his works is a poem celebrating the birth of Alviano's son. In 1515, following Alviano's death in the siege of Brescia, Navagero delivered a widely praised funeral oration for the general, referencing Alviano's special fondness towards himself in particular, which lasted hours. Alviano left to the Venetian Republic a large sum of money, directing that the funds be used to construct a public library housing Greek scholar Bessarion's collection of Greek and Latin manuscripts; this library would later become the Biblioteca Marciana. He also requested that Navagero be appointed the manager of the library. As a result, the Venetian Senate designated Navagero both the manager of the collection and the official historian of the Republic, granting him a considerably large salary of 200 ducats a year. In becoming Venice's official historian, Navagero succeeded Sabellico, his former tutor.

In 1516, Navagero traveled to Rome alongside the humanist Agostino Beazzano. They found lodging at the home of the author and diplomat Baldassare Castiglione and frequently toured the city; it was during such an excursion that Raphael depicted the two travelers in his 1516 work Portrait of Andrea Navagero and Agostino Beazzano. Following his return to Venice, Navagero was confronted by the challenge of organizing Bessarion's massive collection of valuable codices, which had been improperly stored in damp conditions since 1468. Additionally, the manuscripts were frequently borrowed from the library without being returned. In order to address these issues, Navagero enlisted the help of Ramusio to sort through the many works. Furthermore, the two successfully instituted a system of fines to ensure the timely return of the manuscripts. As the official historian of the Republic, Navagero was also tasked with continuing the history of Venice begun by Sabellico. Progress was slow, and although he produced a preliminary draft of ten books, he was dissatisfied with its quality and had it destroyed shortly before his death. The task was later taken up by his friend, Pietro Bembo. In 1521, his funeral oration for Doge Leonardo Loredan was widely praised and reinforced his high scholarly standing.

=== Ambassadorship to Spain ===
Because of his prestigious reputation, Navagero, alongside the future doge Lorenzo Priuli, was appointed as the Venetian ambassador to Spain by Doge Antonio Grimani on 10 October 1523, replacing Gasparo Contarini. Navagero was tasked with negotiating the ratification of a truce between Spain and Venice, as Venice sought to protect its own territory from Spain's expansion in northern Italy. He was also instructed to avoid terms unfavorable to Venice's ally, France. Before traveling to Spain, Navagero agreed to covertly send Spanish reports regarding New World discoveries to Ramusio; in exchange, Ramusio would oversee the Bessarion library and Navagero's prized gardens in Murano and Selve, which he, in his own words, "[cared] for ... more than for anything else in this world".

After Navagero and Priuli departed Venice in July 1524, Priuli fell severely ill and was forced to spend three months in Parma; he later recovered and rejoined Navagero, who had advanced to Livorno. After the king of France, Francis I, was captured by the army of the Holy Roman emperor and king of Spain, Charles V, during the Battle of Pavia in February 1525, Navagero and Priuli received instructions to hasten their travel to Spain to negotiate the truce, as well as to broker Francis's release. After months of delay due to a plague outbreak in Genoa, Navagero and Priuli finally obtained naval passage to Barcelona. They were met with extreme storms on the water, killing Navagero's best horse and leading Navagero to proclaim that he had witnessed "mountains of water".

Following the journey, Navagero and Priuli traveled for four weeks from Barcelona to Toledo, the location of Charles V's court, and arrived on 11 June 1525. There, after a waiting period of three weeks outside of the city walls, they were met by the viceroy Diego Columbus and granted entry to the city. Columbus was accompanied by Baldassare Castiglione, with whom Navagero would spend much of his time in Spain. After the two ambassadors introduced themselves to Charles V, they were later informed by Charles's advisor Mercurino di Gattinara that the king viewed Italy as "his property" and recommended that Venice pay the emperor 120,000 ducats to ensure peace in the region. Priuli returned to Venice, as had been previously planned, while Navagero settled in Toledo, supplying highly detailed descriptions of the city to Ramusio and translating Decades of the New World, written by his newfound friend Peter Martyr d'Anghiera, into Italian. Navagero would eventually acquire numerous other manuscripts from d'Anghiera.

Navagero continued to lobby Charles V for the release of Francis I, who at that time was severely ill and imprisoned in Madrid. In return, Charles demanded control of Burgundy and northern Italy; France acquiesced, ending the negotiations and allowing the royal court to move to Seville, a development which pleased Navagero. Enamored by the city, he enthusiastically described to Ramusio the city's landmarks, including the Alcázar, the Seville harbor, and the Giralda. While in Seville, he was also tasked with gathering information on commerce between Spain and the New World by the Venetian Senate; he later provided these details to Ramusio, who included them in his compendium Navigationi et Viaggi. While in Toledo, Navagero's sources of information included the New Spanish treasurer Diego de Soto, the conquistador Pánfilo de Narváez, the sailor Estêvão Gomes, and the historian Gonzalo Fernández de Oviedo.

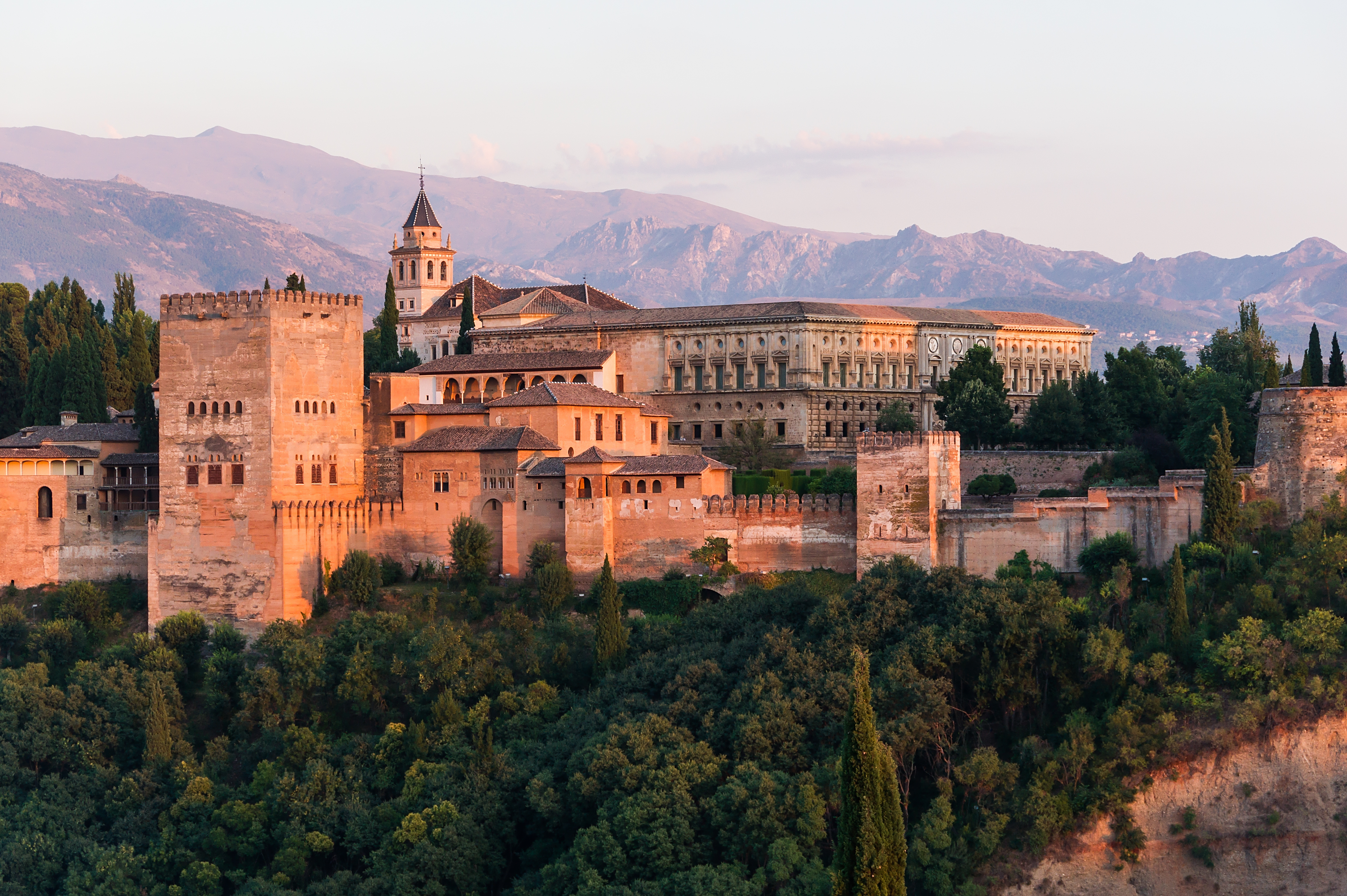
The Alhambra

Shortly after, Charles and his new bride, Isabella of Portugal, traveled to Granada for their honeymoon; Navagero and the rest of the ambassadors followed. There, Navagero stayed in what he described as a "pleasant", "small house". He soon set out to explore the nearby Alhambra, detailing its impressive marble architecture, gardens, and fountains to Ramusio. Navagero, who had previously studied ancient architecture in depth, concluded that the fortress "lack[ed] nothing pleasing or beautiful". He also described to Ramusio the surrounding ruins, homes, gardens, and inhabitants, as well as the valley of the Darro and its fruit, which he labelled "the most delicious in the world". Navagero lamented that the Moors no longer administered the city, believing the Spanish would allow its beauty to deteriorate, and was upset by the forced religious conversion of the locals by the Spanish Inquisition. He criticized the Spanish for already having allowed parts of Granada to fall into ruin and for focusing too heavily on war and conquest.

In December 1526, Navagero followed the royal court to Valladolid, and subsequently to Palencia, where it relocated after a plague outbreak. Navagero and the rest of the diplomats stayed in Paredes de Nava during this time, attempting to calm tensions after the outbreak of the War of the League of Cognac earlier in 1526. The League of Cognac, an alliance between France, Venice, Milan, and Florence, had plotted to retake Charles's territory in northern Italy with the support of Pope Clement VII; Charles's armies invaded Italy in response. As the plague continued to spread, the court moved further north to Burgos, which Navagero referred to pessimistically as a "melancholy city under a melancholy sky". After Francis I had the Spanish diplomat Íñigo López de Mendoza arrested in Paris, Charles ordered the ambassadors of all members of the League of Cognac detained and held at the castle in Poza de la Sal. As Venice was a member of the league, Navagero was among those arrested; he loathed his prison, calling it a "dreadful little place on some rocky mountain". While imprisoned, he grew to resent Mercurino di Gattinara, whom he saw as delaying the peace negotiations, possibly for his own personal interests.

In April 1527, Francis I and Charles V arranged a prisoner exchange, and Navagero traveled across the Pyrenees to Fuenterrabía, where the exchange was to be conducted. Instead of returning to Venice, he was ordered to travel to Paris to develop contacts within Francis's court. He made the journey through France, writing descriptions of its towns and regions along the way, until he reached Paris on 27 June, where he acquainted himself with the French court. Afterwards, he finally traveled back to Venice, returning home on 24 September 1528, more than four years after he had initially left.

=== Ambassadorship to France and death ===
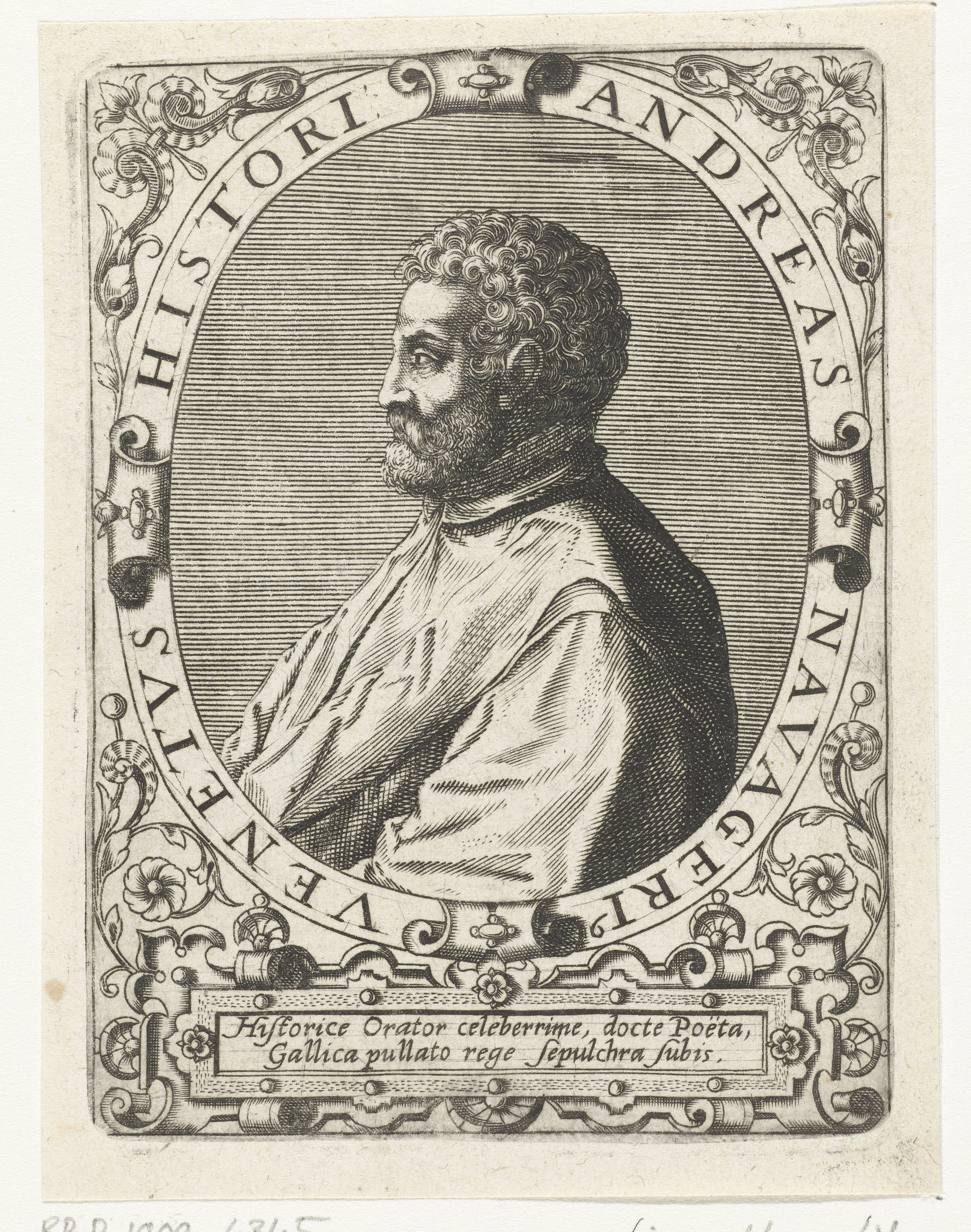
Portrait of Navagero by Johann Theodor de Bry, c. 1597

Upon Navagero's return to Venice, he found his library and garden well maintained by Ramusio; as he had promised, he delivered Ramusio multiple manuscripts regarding Spanish knowledge of the New World. His ambassadorship in Spain during the diplomatically volatile period was lauded, though he later revealed to Ramusio that he had become disillusioned with politics and strongly desired to leave the field. He instead wished to translate the manuscripts he had collected in Spain and cultivate his gardens. Much to his dismay, he was named the ambassador to France in January 1529 after failing to obtain employment as a riformatore dello studio di Padova, one of the three Venetian officials responsible for the University of Padua.

After Francis I's army laid siege to Spanish-controlled Naples, Navagero was sent urgently to France to attempt to pacify the king. He departed from Venice on 2 March and arrived in Blois on 13 April; there, he held discussions with Francis, offering him advice on how to end the war. Navagero was ill throughout these discussions; his health gradually worsened until he died in Blois on 9 May 1529. Prior to his death, he ordered the creation of a tomb for himself in the Church of San Martino di Murano near Venice and the destruction of all of his incomplete works. Francis, who had grown to like Navagero during his ambassadorship with Spain, arranged a grand funeral in his honor. Navagero's brother Pietro retrieved his coffin and Navagero was buried in the Church of San Martino di Murano, which had been next to his gardens. Navagero's nephews Andrea and Bernardo later placed an epitaph in his tomb.

Navagero's death provoked grief among his many associates. Pietro Bembo, a close friend and scholar, wrote a sonnet memorializing Navagero; he privately lamented that "poor Navagero was a rare being, who could not fail to do honor to his country. Had he been an ignorant fool, he would have lived!" Cardinal Jacopo Sadoleto noted Navagero's "excellent gifts and noble character" in a letter written following his death. Another of his friends, Girolamo Fracastoro, dedicated a philosophical dialogue on poetry, Naugerius sive de Poetica, to Navagero, making him the dialogue's main speaker. Navagero's Italian translation of Gonzalo Fernández de Oviedo's Natural and General History of the Indies was found after his death and published by Ramusio in Venice.

== Contributions and assessment ==
=== As an editor ===
In an era in which many editors fabricated readings and ascribed them to false sources, Navagero asserted that any changes he made in his editions were based on genuine ancient sources and that the quality of his editions were due to his hard work in locating sources rather than his own writing acumen. When faced with conflicts between different readings, Navagero generally used the older reading in his editions. Thanks to his diligence, his edition of Ovid's works became the standard upon which all editions of Ovid depended until Nicolaas Heinsius's 1661 edition. Navagero's editions published by the Aldine Press remain highly regarded in the modern era. Georg Luck, a professor at Johns Hopkins, called his 1515 edition of Ovid's works "one of the best early editions of any Latin author" in 2002 and labelled his edition of Virgil's works "an outstanding scholarly achievement" in 2005. E. J. Kenney, the Kennedy Professor of Latin, referred to Navagero as "an excellent Latinist, and Ovid's most competent editor before Heinsius" in his book published in 1974.

=== As a poet ===
Navagero followed the Greek and Augustan models of poetry and often wrote in the styles of Catullus and Petrarch. He admired Catullus so greatly that in order to assert Catullus's poetic supremacy, he is said to have burned copies of the work of Martial, a poet who called himself Catullus's "literary inheriter". The brothers Gaetano and Giovanni Antonio Volpi republished the Lusus in 1718 alongside Navagero's edition of Ovid, two of his funeral orations, and four literary letters. More than two centuries after the Volpi brothers' 1718 publication of the Lusus, which contained 47 poems, two separate scholars, Maria Antonietta Benassi and Claudio Griggio, uncovered more of Navagero's Latin works in Italian manuscripts, adding 22 poems to his known body of work. The majority of the Lusus comprises Neo-Latin pastoral vignettes written in the elegiac meter and reminiscent of classical Latin pastorals, particularly Virgil's Eclogues. Similarly to the Eclogues, much of the Lusus affectionately describes pastoral life in the countryside of northern Italy. Navagero based some of the poems in the Lusus on contemporary events; for example, "Damon" chronicles the Battle of Ravenna of 1512.

Among both contemporary and modern critics, Navagero is recognized as a talented poet. Aldus Manutius, the founder of the Aldine Press, noted his "sharp mind" and "sure judgment" and compared his skill in writing to that of "the great authors of antiquity". His votive epigrams, which the 16th-century historian Paolo Giovio described as having a "tender and very sweetly primitive grace", were frequently imitated by vernacular poets in both Italy and France, such as Pierre de Ronsard. The poet Juan Boscán credited Navagero with introducing him to Petrarchism, which at that time was popular in Italy but had yet to emerge in Spain. Barbara Fuchs, a professor at UCLA, labelled this encounter "the introduction of Renaissance poetics to Spain". In 1965, W. Leonard Grant described Navagero as "one of the most elegant Latin poets of the Italian Renaissance and one of the very few important Neo-Latin writers produced by Venice", while in 1992 the art historian John Shearman deemed him "the best of the many imitators of the classical epigrams".
