= Portrait of Andrea Navagero and Agostino Beazzano =

Painting by Raphael

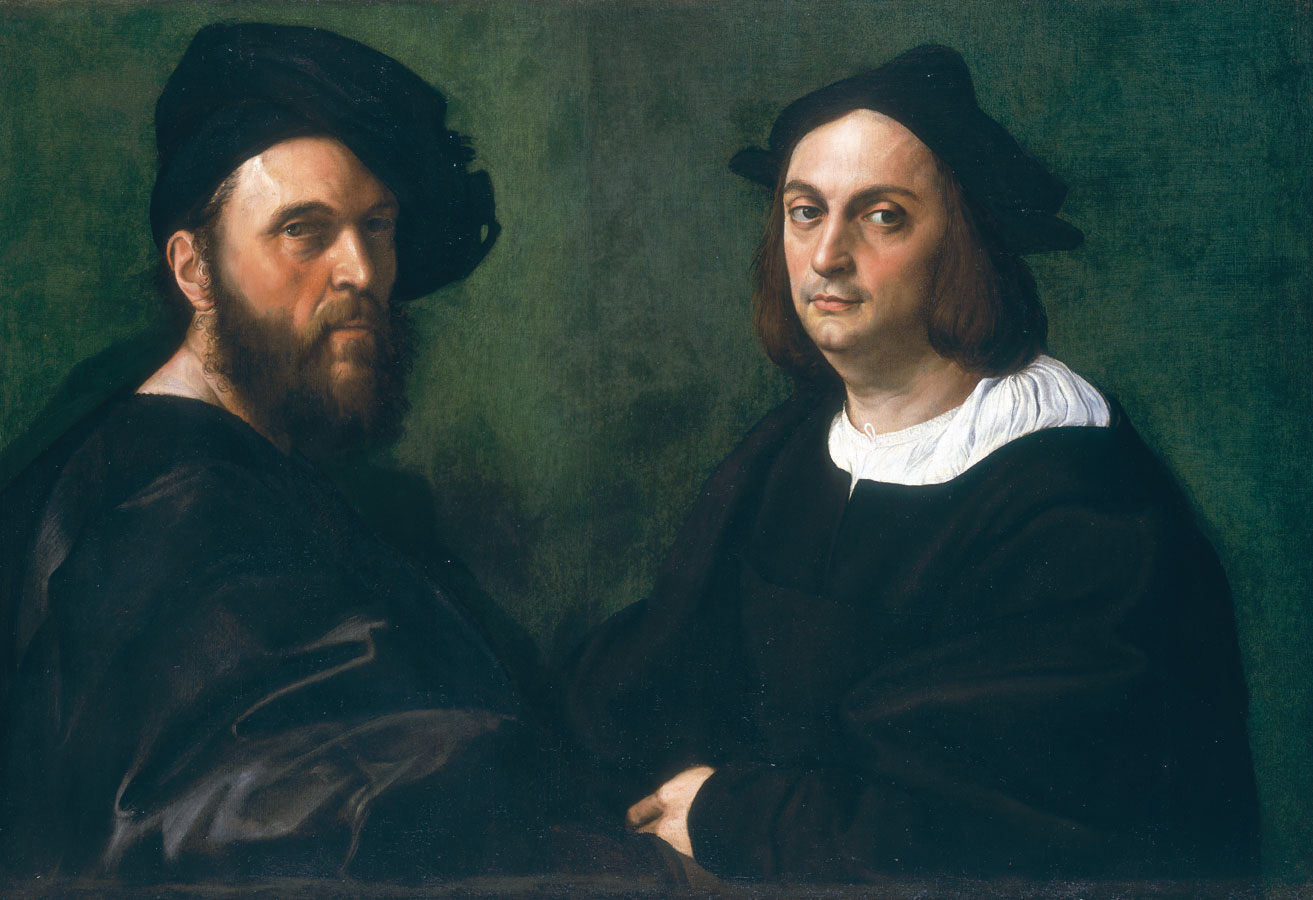
- Artist: Raphael
- Year: 1516
- Medium: Oil on canvas
- Dimensions: 76 cm × 107 cm (30 in × 42 in)
- Location: Galleria Doria Pamphilj, Rome

The Portrait of Andrea Navagero e Agostino Beazzano is a painting by the Italian High Renaissance painter Raphael, created in 1516. It is housed in the Galleria Doria Pamphilj, Rome.

== History ==
The work seems to have been produced in April 1516 when its two subjects Andrea Navagero and Agostino Beazzano were still in Rome for a short period before Navagero returned to Venice on being made administrator general of the Venetian Republic. A 1516 letter from Pietro Bembo to Cardinal Bibbiena shows that Raphael, Baldassare Castiglione, Beazzano and Navagero wished to make a journey together. Traditional literature relates that Raphael produced this work before setting off as a present for their mutual friend. In 1530, the work was recorded as being in Bembo's home in Padua. It was loaned to the Prado Museum in 2008 for an exhibition on Renaissance portraits, though it did not prove possible to loan it to the exhibition at the National Gallery in 2022, delayed from 2020 and marking five hundred years since the artist's death.

== See also ==
- List of paintings by Raphael
