= Landscape with the Flight into Egypt (Carracci) =

Painting by Annibale Carracci

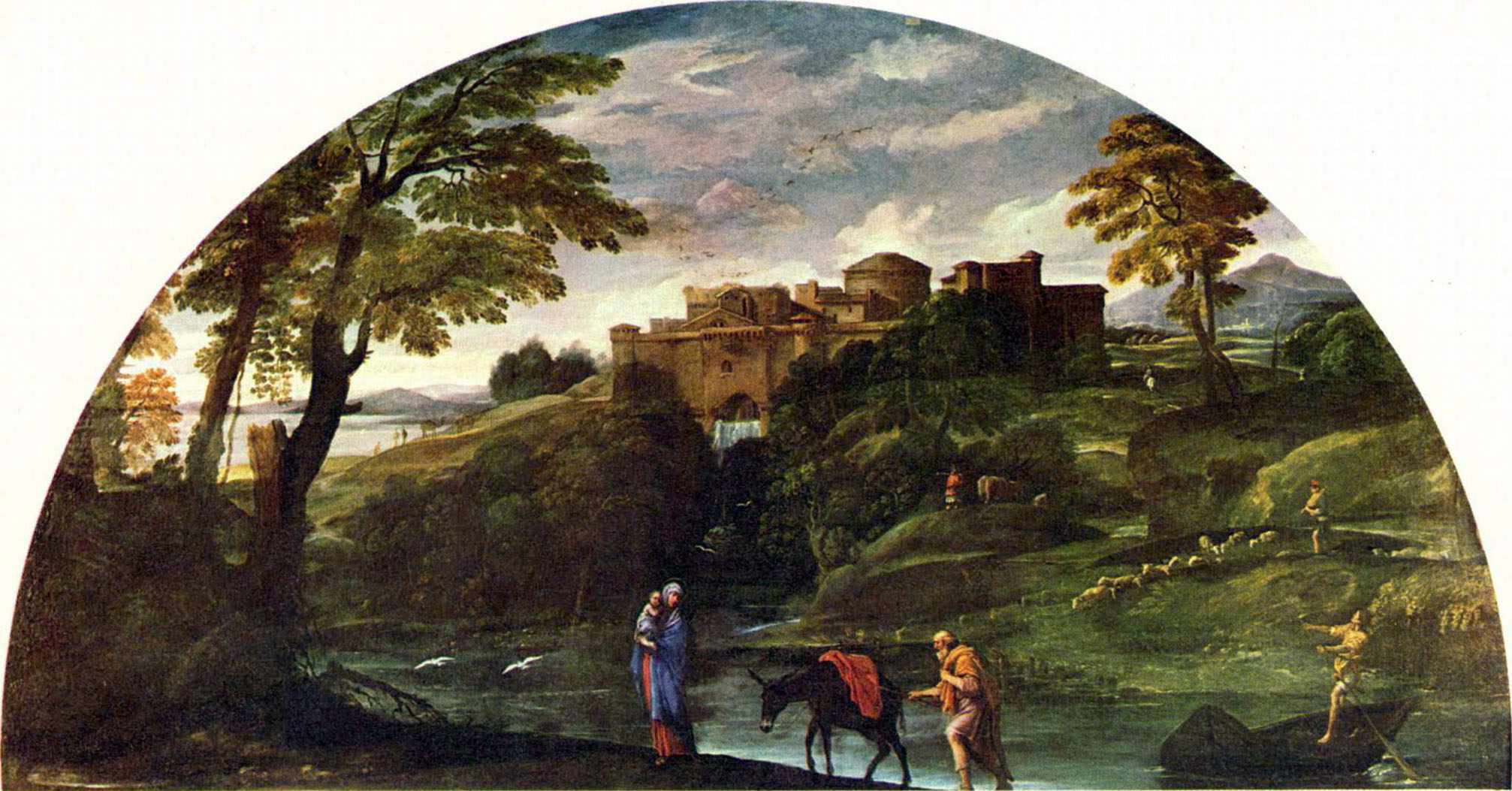
- Artist: Annibale Carracci
- Year: c. 1604
- Medium: Oil on canvas
- Dimensions: 122 cm × 230 cm (48 in × 91 in)
- Location: Galleria Doria Pamphilj, Rome

Landscape with the Flight into Egypt is a painting by the Italian Baroque painter Annibale Carracci. Dating from c. 1604, it remains in the palace for which it was painted in Rome as part of the collection of the Galleria Doria Pamphilj.

The painting, depicting the biblical New Testament event of the Flight into Egypt, was commissioned in 1603 by Cardinal Pietro Aldobrandini for the family chapel in his palace in Rome, later known as Palazzo Doria Pamphilj. The commission includes six paintings in six lunettes, which were executed by Carracci and his pupils (including Francesco Albani, Domenichino and Giovanni Lanfranco).

The work is frequently regarded as a key work in Baroque landscape painting and is the "most celebrated example" of the "new landscape style" Carracci developed in Rome of "carefully constructed landscape panoramas", according to Rudolf Wittkower. For John Rupert Martin it is "the archetypal classical landscape, later to be emulated with variations by Domenichino, Poussin and Claude ... the small scale of the figures in relation to the spacious natural setting at once establishes a new priority in which landscape takes first place and history second"; though insofar as it is "new", that is for Italian painting, as such works had been common in Northern painting since Joachim Patinir began to use the same reversal of scale almost a century before. The journey of the Holy Family is echoed by other moving elements including the sheep, birds, cows and the camels on the ridge at left.

Wittkower sees in it "a heroic and aristocratic conception of Nature tamed and ennobled by the presence of man", as such works always contain a large man-made feature, here the castle "severely composed of horizontals and verticals" under which the party moves. They are placed at the meeting of two diagonals represented by the sheep and the river, "thus figures and buildings are intimately blended with the carefully arranged pattern of the landscape".

Kenneth Clark mentions the work as an example of the "ideal landscape" driven to promote itself in the hierarchy of genres by emulating (in the absence of much evidence of what classical landscape painting was like) an essentially literary vision, largely derived from the pastoral poems of Virgil: "the features of which it is composed must be chosen from nature, as poetic diction is chosen from ordinary speech, for their elegance, their ancient associations, and their faculty of harmonious combination. Ut pictura poesis". Clark's praise of the work is noticeably faint, as it lacks the spirit he finds in Giorgione and Claude in the same tradition: "At their best, as in the lunettes in the Doria Gallery, Annibale Carracci's landscapes are admirable pieces of picture-making, in which agreeably stylized parts are built up into a harmonious whole. We recognize the science which has gone into the construction of the castle in the centre of the Flight into Egypt... But in the end these eclectic landscapes are of interest only to historians".
