= Female Martyr with Two Angels =

Painting by Parmigianino

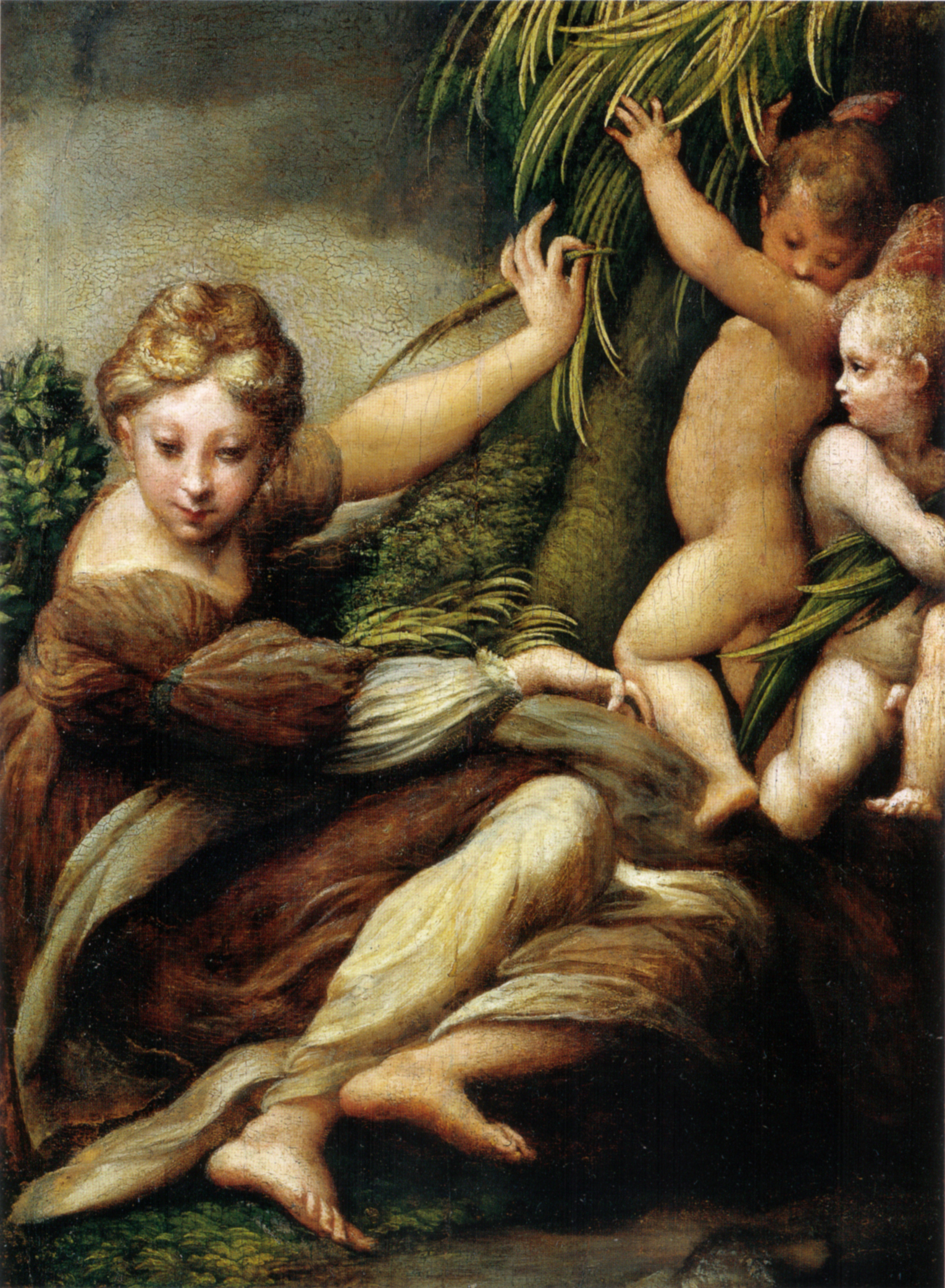
Female Martyr with Two Angels (c. 1523–1524) by Parmigianino

Female Martyr with Two Angels is an oil on panel painting by Parmigianino, from c. 1523-1524. It is held in the Städel Museum, in Frankfurt, to which it was donated in 1913 by Baroness Emilie Margarethe Beaulieu-Marconnay, member of a family of bankers and art patrons in the city.

Two early copies survive, one in the Galleria nazionale di Parma and the other in the Kunsthistorisches Museum in Vienna, in which a toothed wheel (attribute of Catherine of Alexandria) is added beside the female saint. The Vienna painting was previously considered an autograph work and that in Frankfurt as a copy, but in 1932 art historians reversed their opinion after an X-ray revealed a fine under-drawing under pesanti and re-paintings on the Frankfurt work. All art historians except Copertini (1945-1950) and Frölich-Bum (1953) now hold the Frankfurt work to be autograph.

Freedberg dated the work to around 1524 based on comparison with the Doria Madonna (Galleria Doria-Pamphili) and the portrait of Paola Gonzaga in the Stufetta of Diana and Actaeon at Fontanellato, particularly regarding the pose and the saint's face. That pose also recalls the Diana in the Camera della Badessa in Parma, painted by Correggio, a painter with a strong influence on Parmigianino's early works such as that in Frankfurt.
