= Portrait of Laura da Pola =

1543-1544 portrait by Lorenzo Lotto

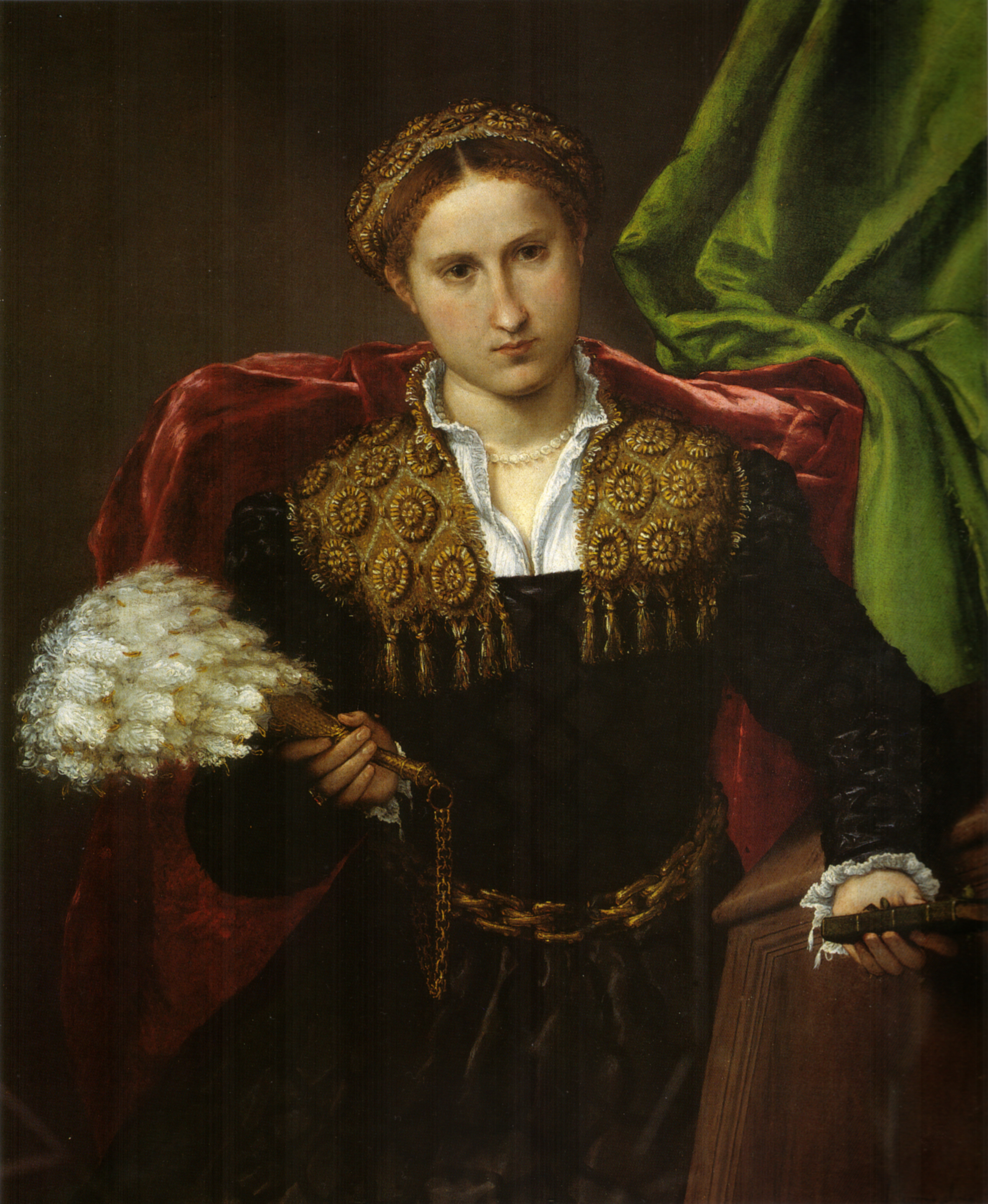
Portrait of Laura da Pola (1543–1544) by Lorenzo Lotto

Portrait of Laura da Pola is an oil-on-canvas painting created in 1543–44 by the Italian artist Lorenzo Lotto. Its subject was the wife of Febo Bettignoli da Brescia, a nobleman from Treviso, who commissioned this work and its pair from Lotto in April 1543, as recorded in the painter's account books. The paintings were delivered in 1544 and after Febo's death in 1547 remained with his wife's descendants until her family died out in the 19th century. Both works were acquired in 1859 by the Pinacoteca di Brera, where they still hang
