= Giacomo Eremiti =

Italian painter

Giacomo Eremiti (17th century) was an Italian painter of landscapes, active in Rome. He painted the landscapes in the Birth of Adonis and the Rape of Adonis now in the Palazzo Doria Pamphili in Rome, and in the figures were added by Nicolas Poussin.
