= Galleria Doria Pamphilj =

Art museum in Rome, Italy

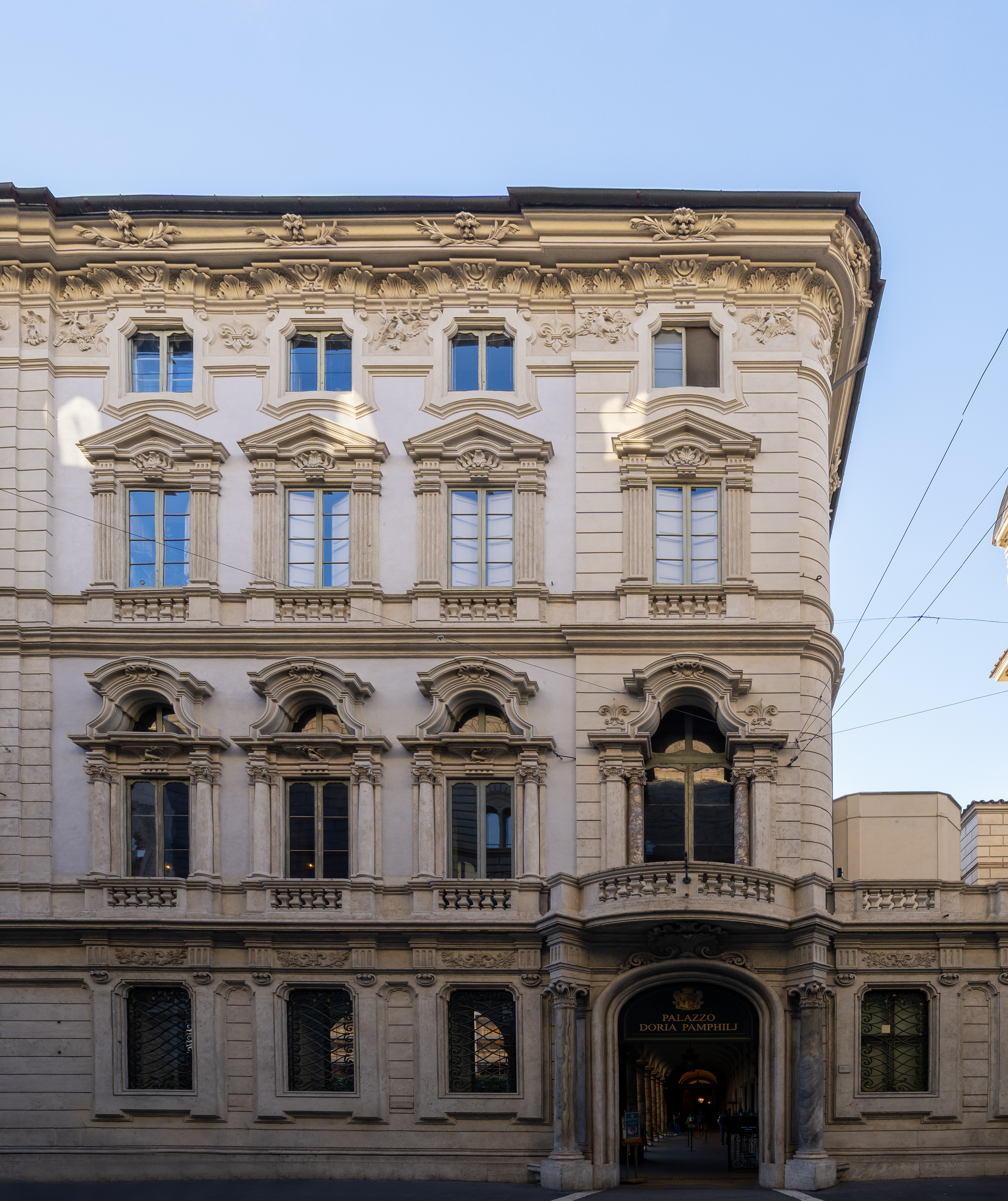
- The Palazzo Doria Pamphilj façade on Via del Corso
- Click on the map for a fullscreen view
- Established: 1651
- Location: Via del Corso 305, 00186 Rome, Italy
- Coordinates: 41°53′52″N 12°28′52″E
- Type: Art museum, Historic site
- Website: www.doriapamphilj.it/en/

The Galleria Doria Pamphilj (often Doria Pamphilj Gallery or Doria Pamphili Gallery in English) is a large private art collection housed in the Palazzo Doria Pamphilj in Rome, Italy, between Via del Corso and Via della Gatta. The principal entrance is on the Via del Corso. (Until recently, the entrance to the gallery was from the Piazza del Collegio Romano.) The palace façade on Via del Corso is adjacent to a church, Santa Maria in Via Lata. Like the palace, it is still privately owned by the princely Roman family Doria Pamphili. Tours of the state rooms often culminate in concerts of Baroque and Renaissance music, paying tribute to the setting and the masterpieces it contains.

With some earlier and later exceptions, the bulk of the collection consists of works from the 16th and 17th centuries, a high proportion of them of exceptional quality.

== Collection ==
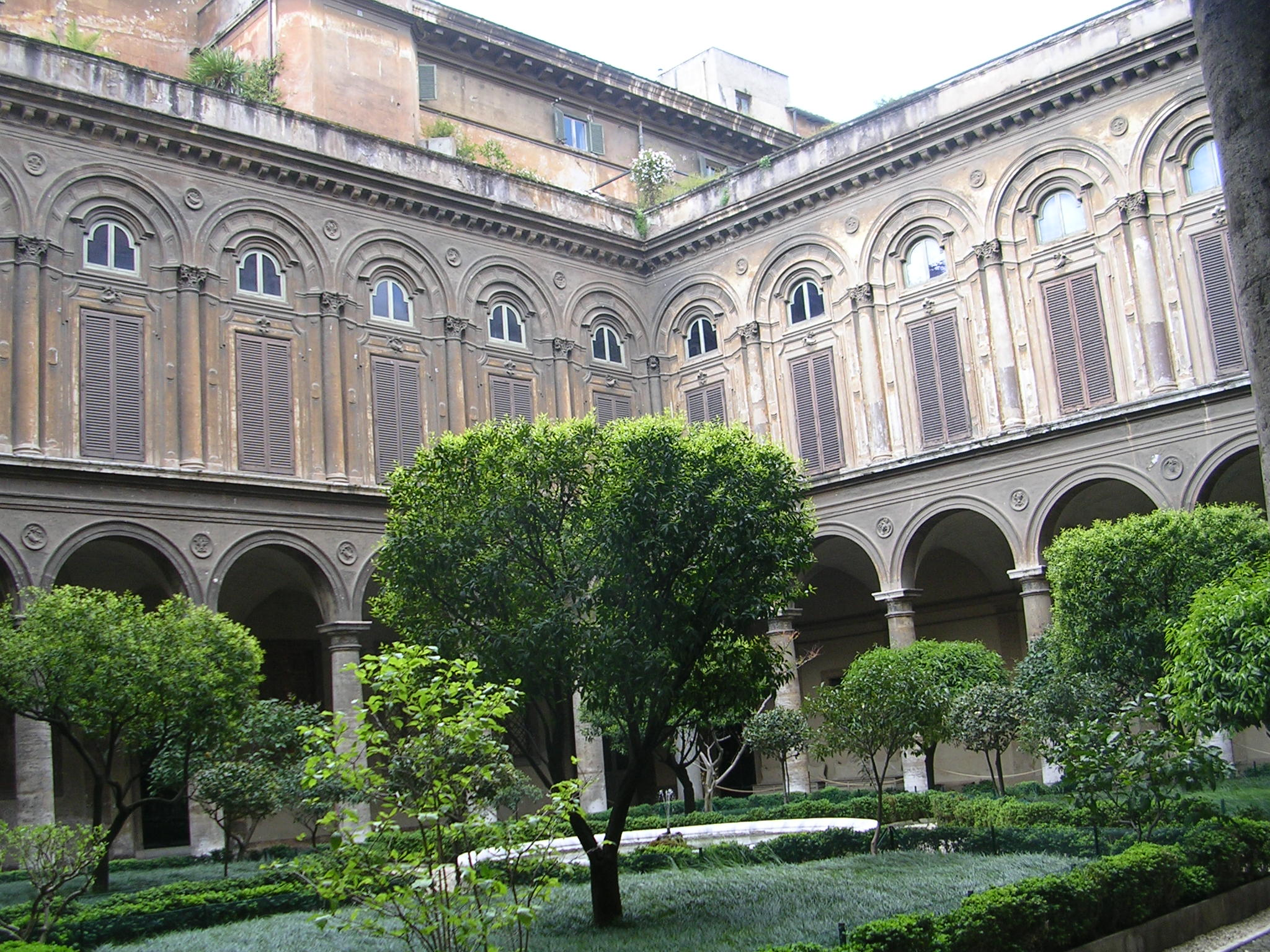
The courtyard. The first floor shuttered windows correspond to a four-sided gallery, housing the collection's main paintings.

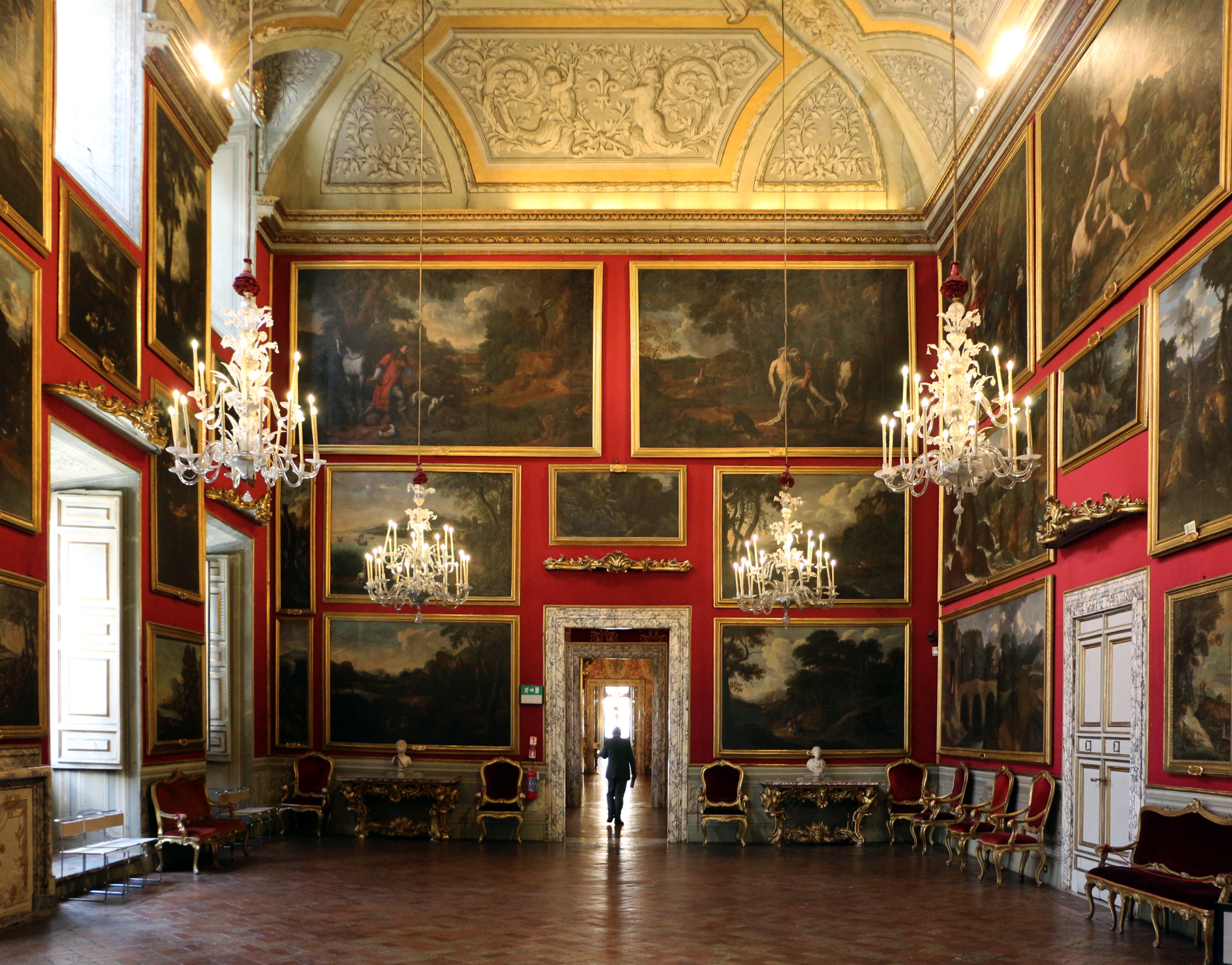
Salone del Poussin.

The large collection of paintings, furniture and statuary has been assembled since the 16th century by the Doria, Pamphilj, Landi and Aldobrandini families now united through marriage and descent under the simplified surname Doria Pamphilj. The collection includes paintings and furnishings from Innocent X's Palazzo Pamphilj (in Piazza Navona), who bequeathed them to his nephew Camillo Pamphilj.

The Palazzo has grown over the centuries; it is likely to be the largest in Rome still in private ownership. The main collection is displayed in state rooms, including the chapel, complete with the mummified corpse of the family saint. However, the bulk is displayed in a series of four gilded and painted galleries surrounding a courtyard. An extensive suite of further rooms have now been converted to permanent well-lit galleries, containing the more medieval and Byzantine art in the collection.

The palace was renovated for the marriage of Andrea IV Doria Pamphilj Landi to Princess Leopoldina Maria of Savoy, daughter of Louis Victor, Prince of Carignan, and Christine of Hesse-Rotenburg in 1767. Work was carried out under the supervision of Francesco Nicoletti, an architect from Trapani.

Diego Velázquez's Portrait of Innocent X (previously Cardinal Giovan Battista Pamphilj, who became Pope in 1644) is considered to be the collection's masterpiece. Velázquez, while not idealizing the Pope's countenance, is not unflattering in the portrait; Innocent X's features were believed by his contemporaries to symbolise a despotic lifestyle and vindictive character. The portrait painted to commemorate the Holy Year was commissioned by his hedonistic sister-in-law Olimpia Maidalchini, who was his close confidante and adviser, and some say mistress. Since 1927, Velázquez's portrait has been placed in a specially designated small room along with a sculptured bust of the same pope by Gian Lorenzo Bernini.

Olimpia Maidalchini's son Camillo Pamphilj, defying his powerful mother, renounced the cardinalship conferred on him by his uncle the Pope and married the widowed Olimpia Borghese. Born an Aldobrandini, she brought the palazzo known as Palazzo Aldobrandini into the Pamphilj family. Following a period of exile in the country, to avoid confrontation with the Pope and Olimpia Maidalchini, the newly married couple took up permanent residence in the Palazzo Aldobrandini, which from 1654 Camillo began to expand on a large scale; neighbouring houses and a convent were bought and demolished as the palazzo grew, in spite of local opposition from the neighbouring Jesuits at the Collegio Romano. The architect in charge of this lengthy project was Antonio Del Grande. The façade facing the Via del Corso, however, is by Gabriele Valvassori. Following Camillo's death in 1666, building continued under the auspices of his two sons Giovanni Battista (his heir) and Benedetto.

One of Camillo and Olimpia's daughters, Anna Pamphilj, married the Genoese aristocrat Giovanni Andrea III Doria Landi in 1671, and it was their descendants who inherited the Palazzo when the Roman branch of the Pamphilj family ended in 1760. In 1763 Prince Andrea IV combined his Genoese and Roman names to the present Doria-Pamphilj-Landi. In 1767 the ceilings of the state rooms were frescoed by late-Baroque artists such as Crescenzio Onofri, Aureliano Milani, and Stefano Pozzi (Sala degli Specchi).

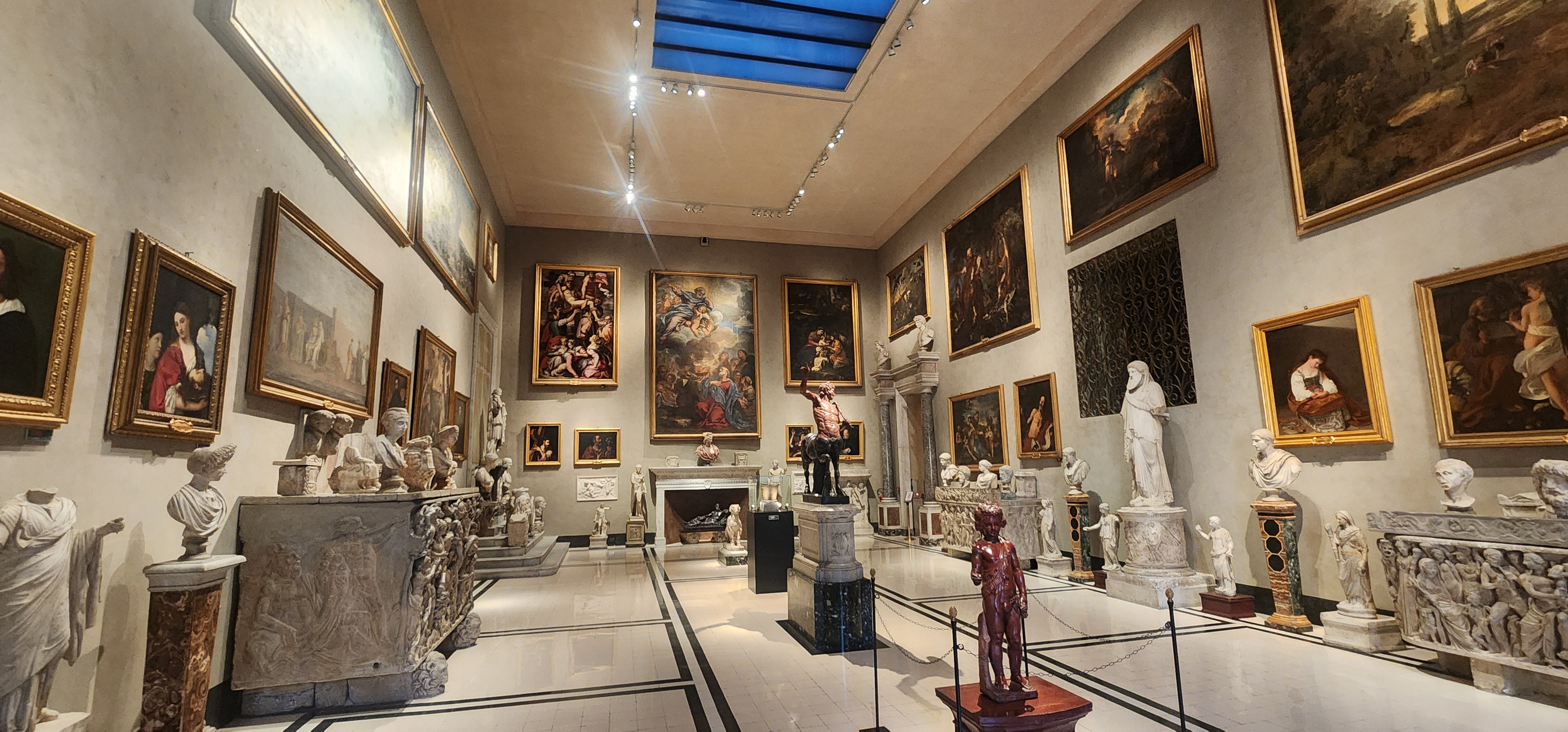
Galleria Doria Pamphilj keeps many of its most prized paintings in this room, the Aldobrandini Room. Note the Caravaggios at the lower right.

The collection was first opened to the public by the three-quarters English Princess Orietta Pogson Doria Pamphilj, whose English husband Commander Frank Pogson added her name to his. Her own father, Prince Filippo Andrea VI, was half-English. Princess Orietta and Commander Frank did much to restore the collection and the palazzo; following her death in 2000 the guardianship of the collection was taken over by her adopted, English-born children, Jonathan Doria Pamphilj and Gesine Pogson Doria Pamphilj, who still live in the palazzo. Along with the possessions of the Colonna and Pallavicini-Rospigliosi families, this is one of the largest private art collections in Rome.

== Overview ==
- The family chapel was designed by architect Carlo Fontana in the late 17th century, but has since been altered. The ivory crucifix was carved by Ercole Ferrata.
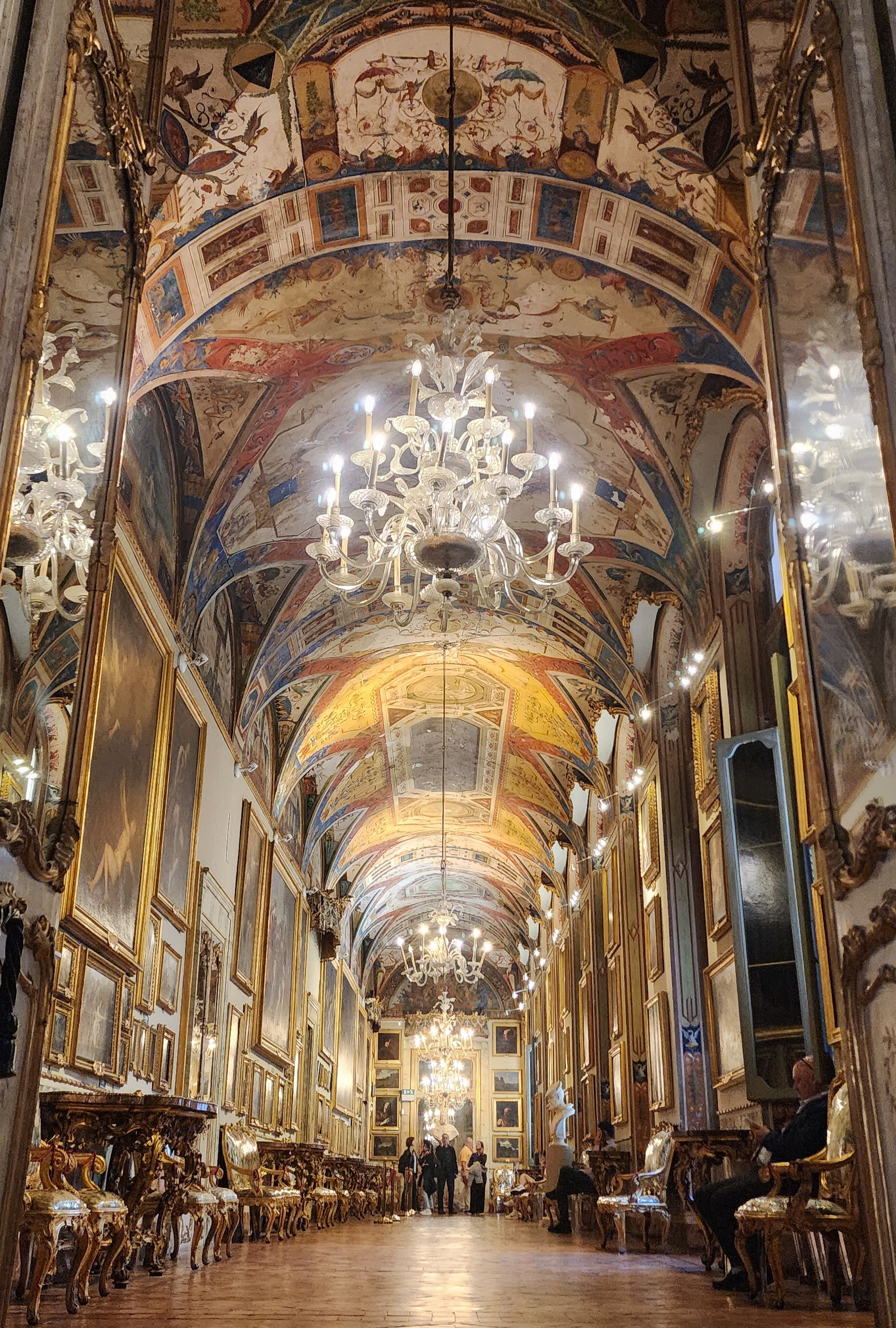
- A corridor at the gallery.
  The Saletta Gialla and Saletta Rossa contain Gobelins tapestries, including those depicting the signs of the zodiac by Claude Audran.
- Sala del Poussin: Landscapes by Claude Lorrain. Birth of Adonis and the Rape of Adonis by Nicolas Poussin and Giacomo Eremiti.

=== Main painting galleries ===
- 1st Gallery: Mary Magdalene by Annibale Carracci; Christ in the House of the Pharisee by Ludovico Cigoli; Saint Roch with an Angel by Carlo Saraceni, and Tancred and Erminia by Guercino.
- 2nd Gallery (Galleria degli Specchi): Velázquez and Bernini portraits, antique Roman statues, and The Crossing of Red Sea by Antonio Tempesta.
- Saletta del Seicento: Caravaggio's Penitent Magdalene and Rest on the Flight into Egypt
- Saletta del Cinquecento: Double portrait by Raphael, Salome by Titian.
- Saletta del Quattrocento: works by Ludovico Mazzolino and Antoniazzo Romano.
- 3rd Gallery: Saint Jerome by Lorenzo Lotto, Return of the Prodigal Son by Guercino; Madonna in Adoration of the Child by Guido Reni; Crucifixion by Marcello Venusti; Holy Family by Sassoferrato; Landscape with Hunting Scene by Paul Bril.
- 4th Gallery: bust of Olimpia Aldobrandini by Alessandro Algardi; Saint John the Baptist by Caravaggio; Christ in the Temple by Mazzolino.
- Saletta degli Specchi: Landscape by Domenichino; Saint Joseph by Guercino; Angel by Titian, Christ in the Garden by Venusti.
- Salone Aldobrandini: antique sculptures and marble reliefs by François Duquesnoy.
- Room of Andrea Doria: St Anthony with a Donor by Jan Mabuse and the Portrait of Andrea Doria by Sebastiano del Piombo.
- Green Salon: large mid-15th century Tournai tapestry with the medieval legend of Alexander the Great; bronze of Innocent X by Algardi; Portrait by Lotto; and Filippo Lippi's Annunciation.

Note: The Palazzo housing the Gallery Doria Pamphilj should not be confused with the Palazzo Pamphilj, in Rome's Piazza Navona, now the Brazilian Embassy. Nor should this palace be confused with a second Palazzo Doria-Pamphilj, a summer urban villa, in Valmontone near Rome; this palace, though badly damaged during the Second World War, is renowned for its late Baroque fresco series by Francesco Cozza, Pier Francesco Mola, and Mattia Preti.

== Collection highlights ==
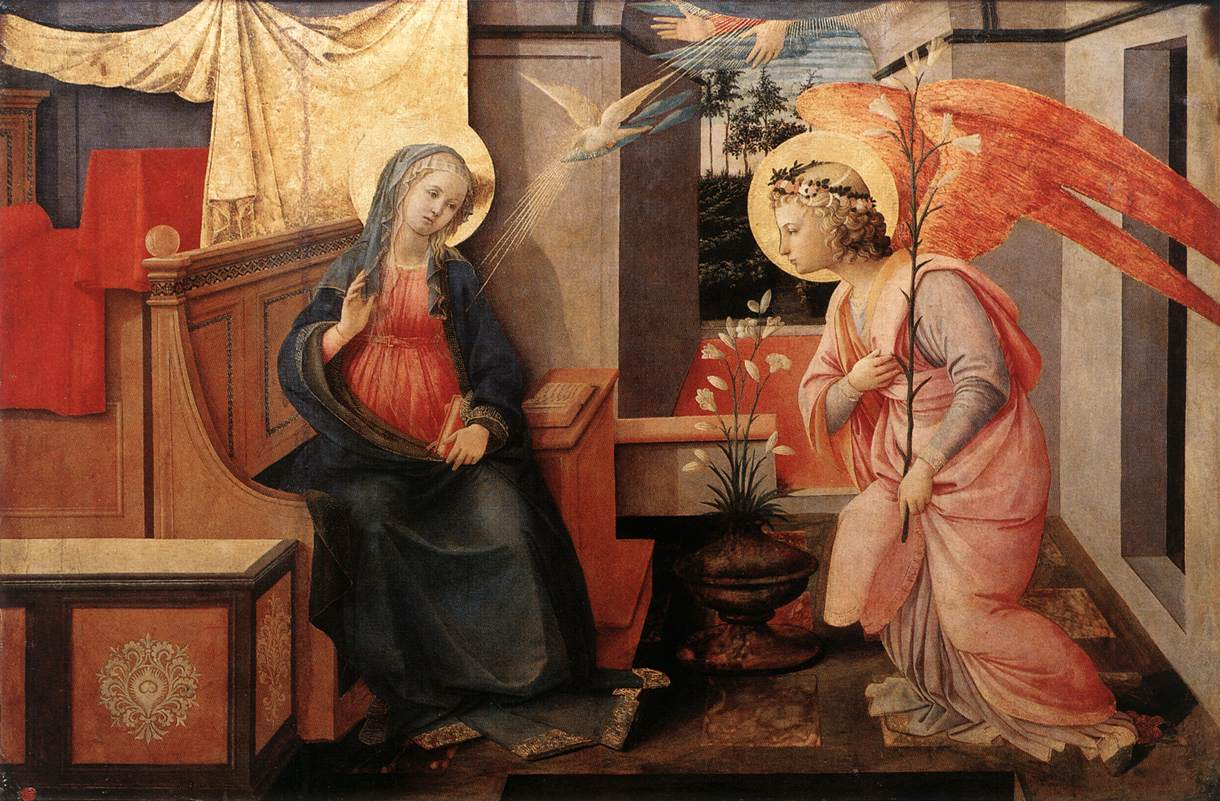
Filippo Lippi, Annunciation (c. 1445–1450)
117 × 173 cm

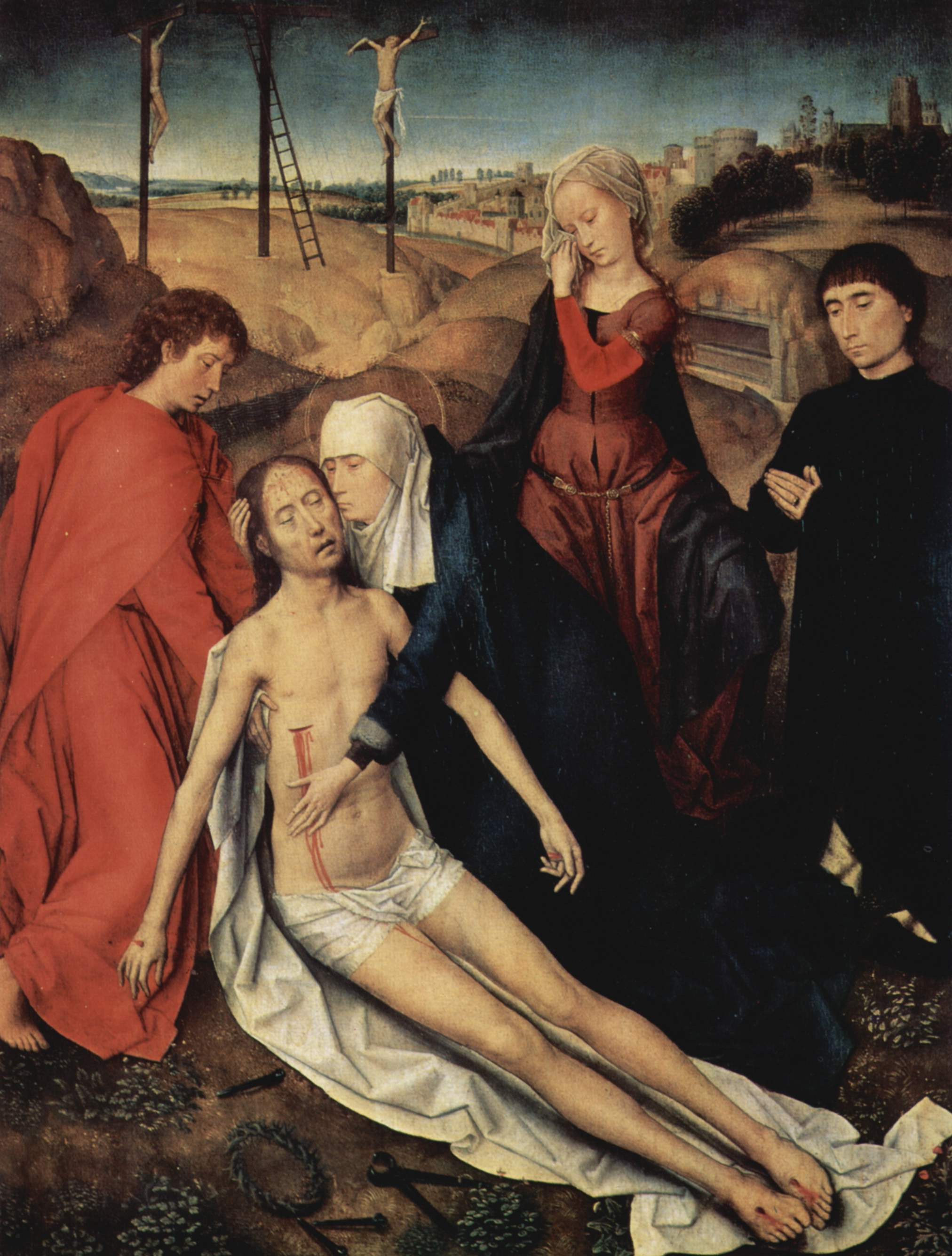
Hans Memling, Lamentation (c. 1470)
68 × 53 cm

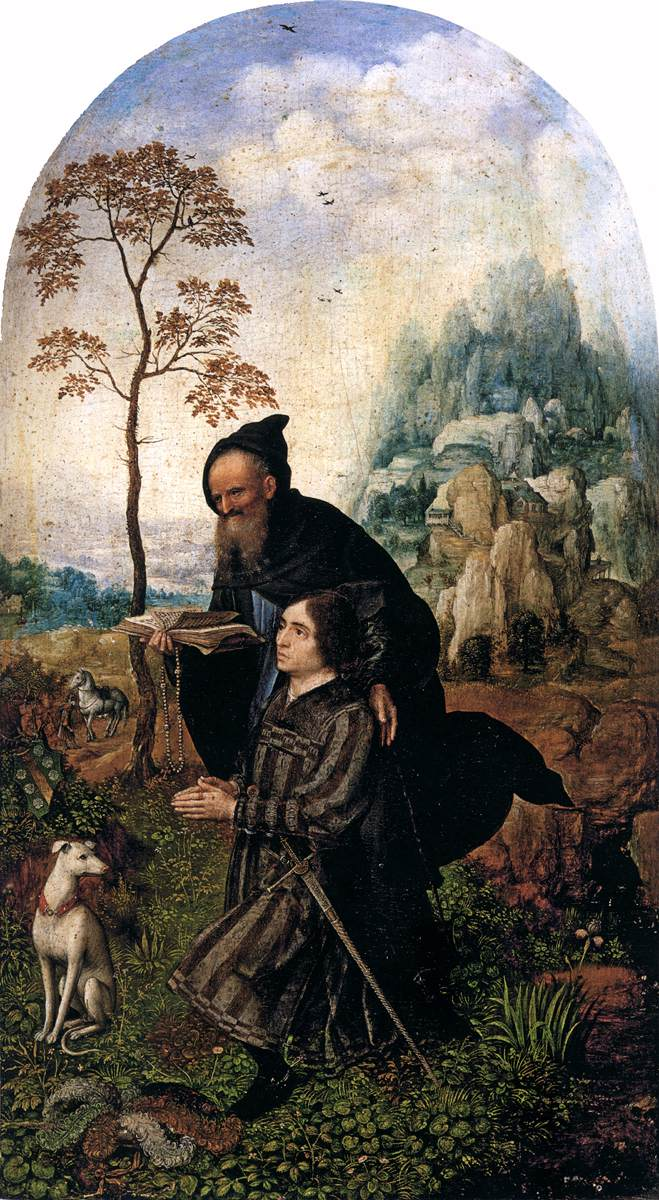
Jan Gossaert, Doria-Pamphilj Diptych (c. 1508)
40 × 22 cm

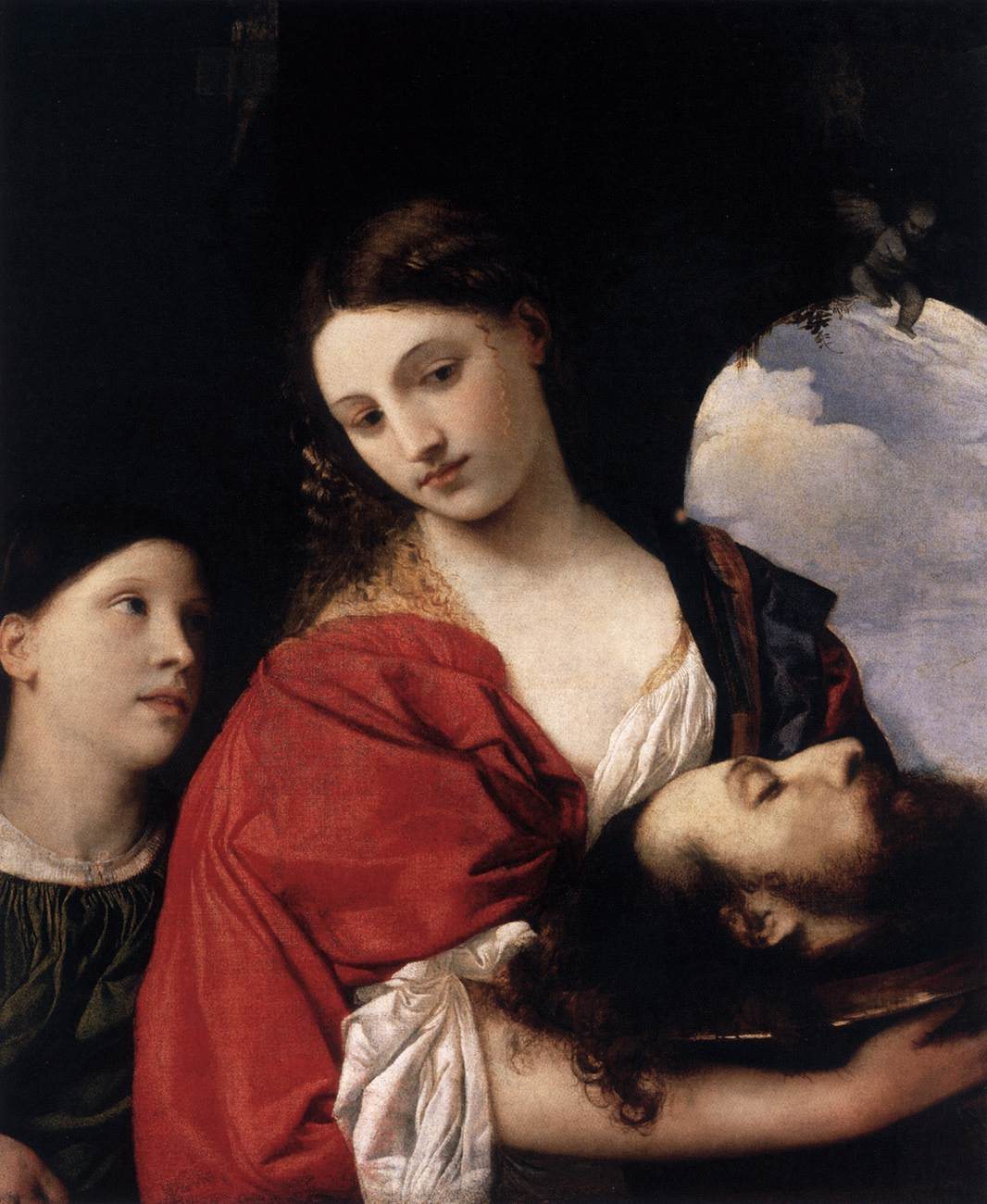
Titian, Salome (c. 1515)
90 × 72 cm

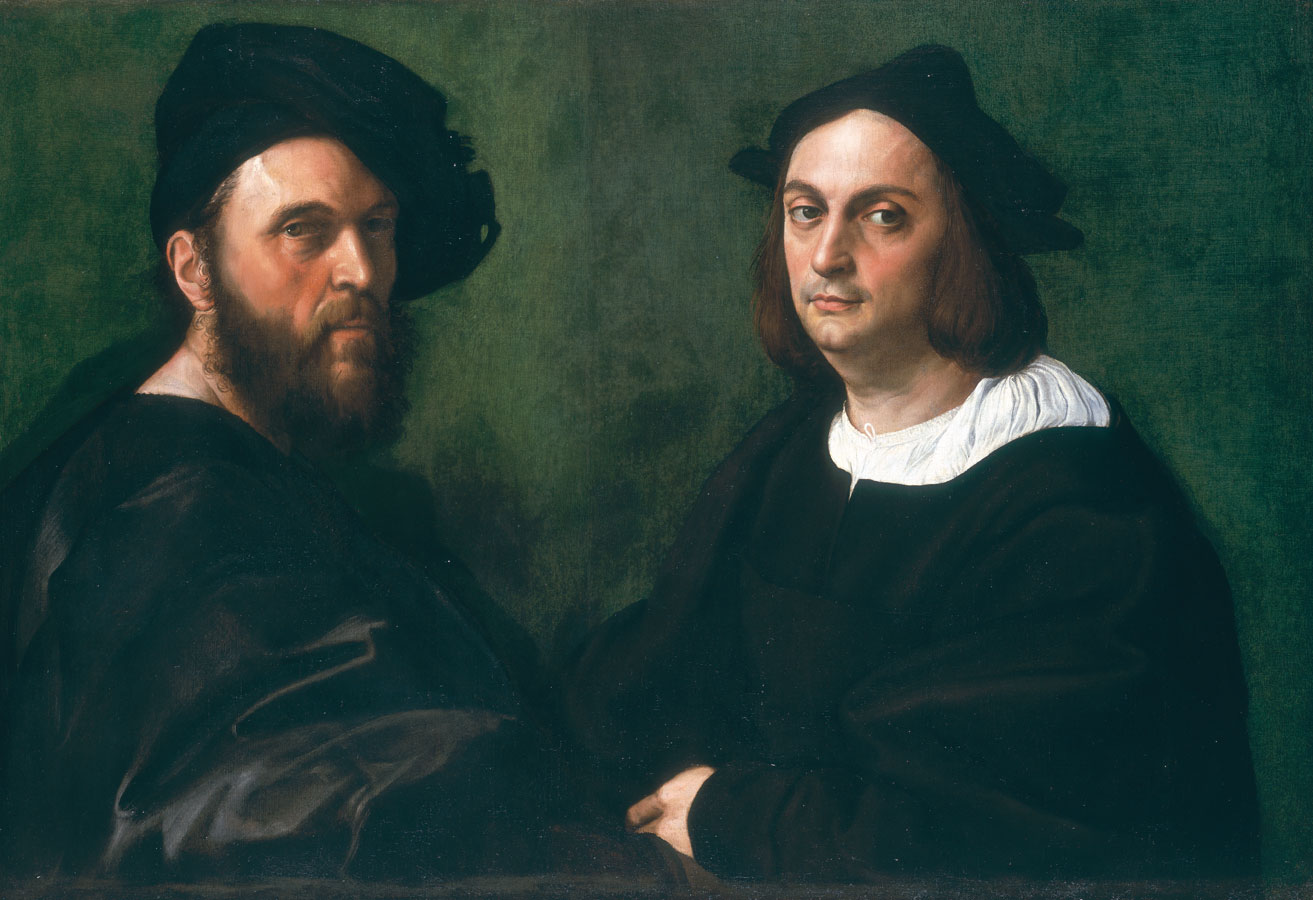
Raphael, Portrait of Andrea Navagero and Agostino Beazzano (c. 1516)
77 × 111 cm

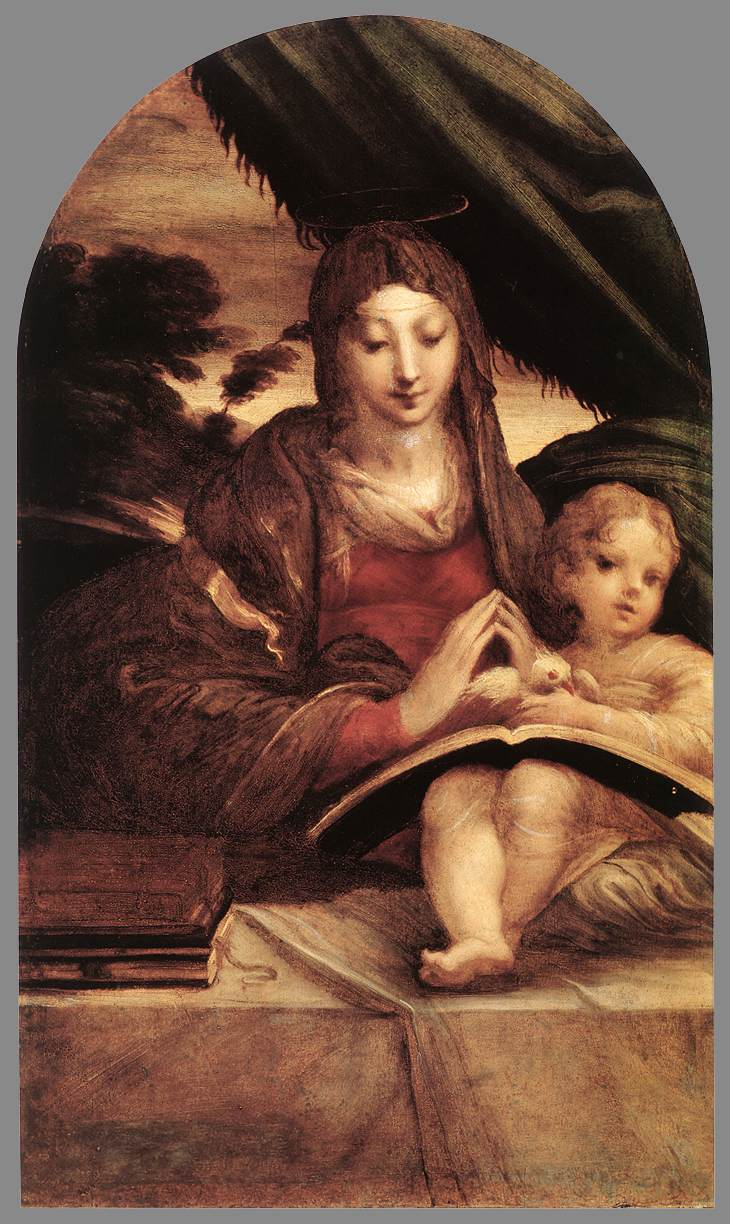
Parmigianino, Doria Madonna (c. 1525)
59 × 34 cm

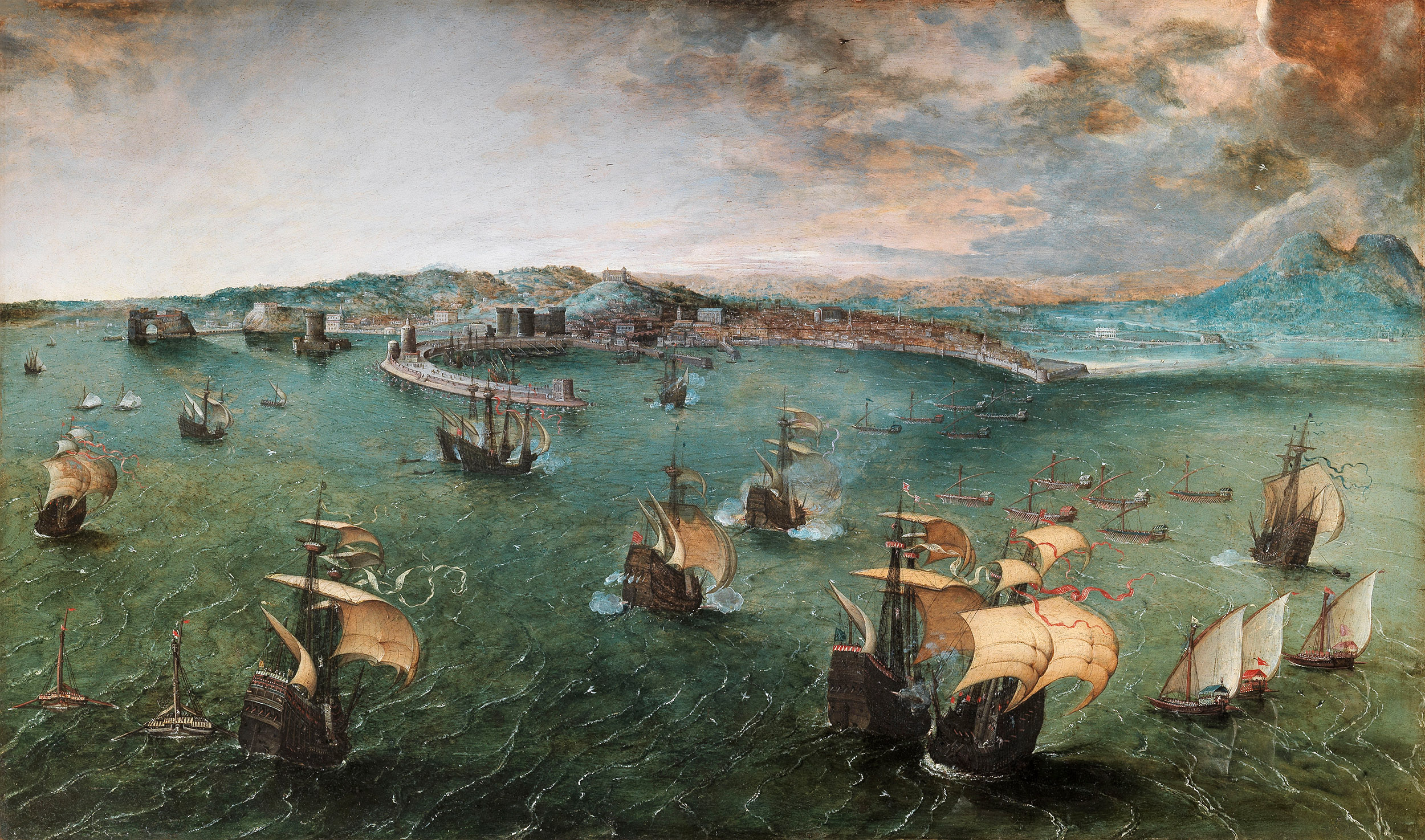
Pieter Bruegel the Elder, Naval Battle in the Gulf of Naples (1558–1562)
42 × 71 cm

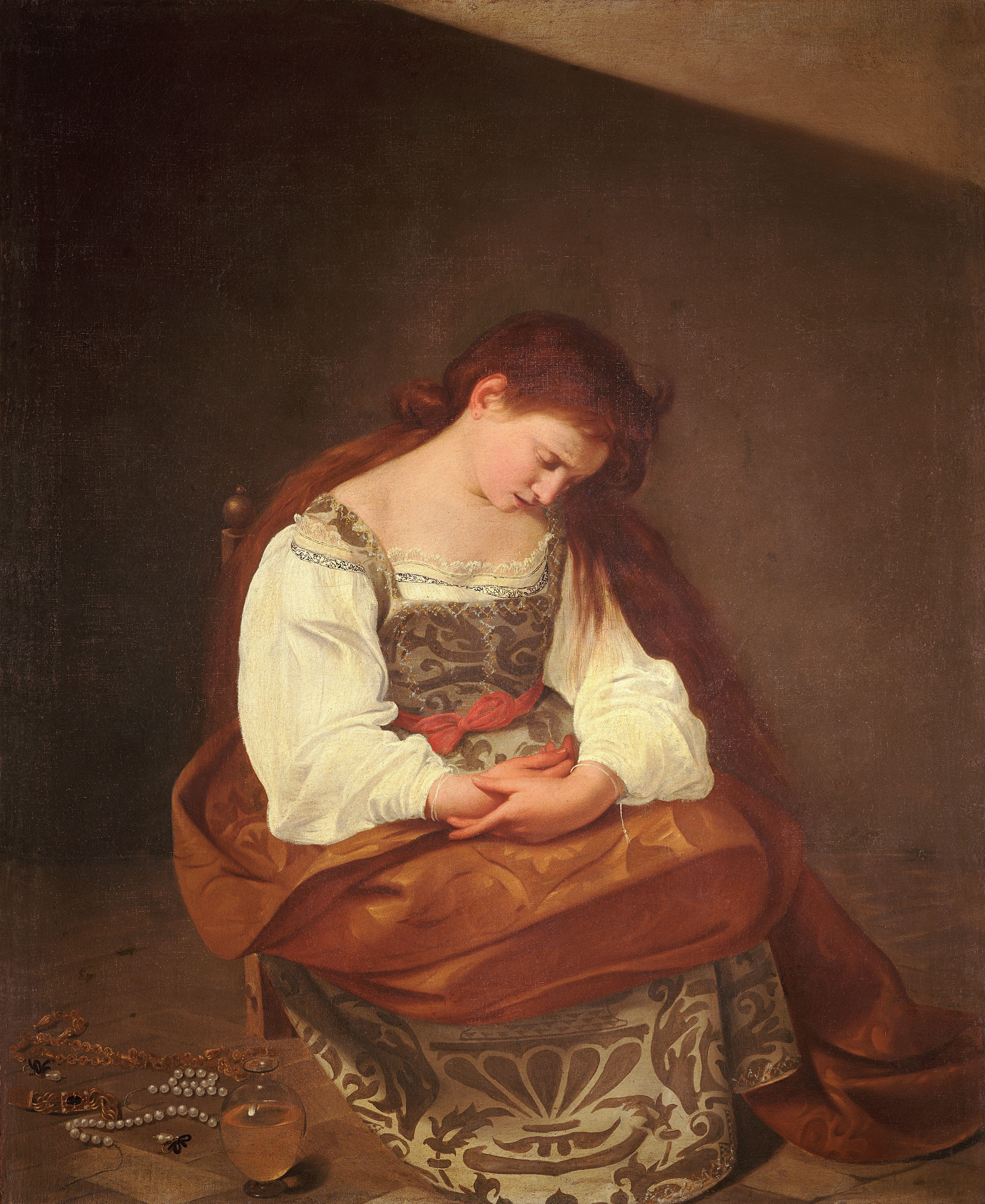
Caravaggio, Penitent Magdalene (1593)
122.5 × 98.5 cm

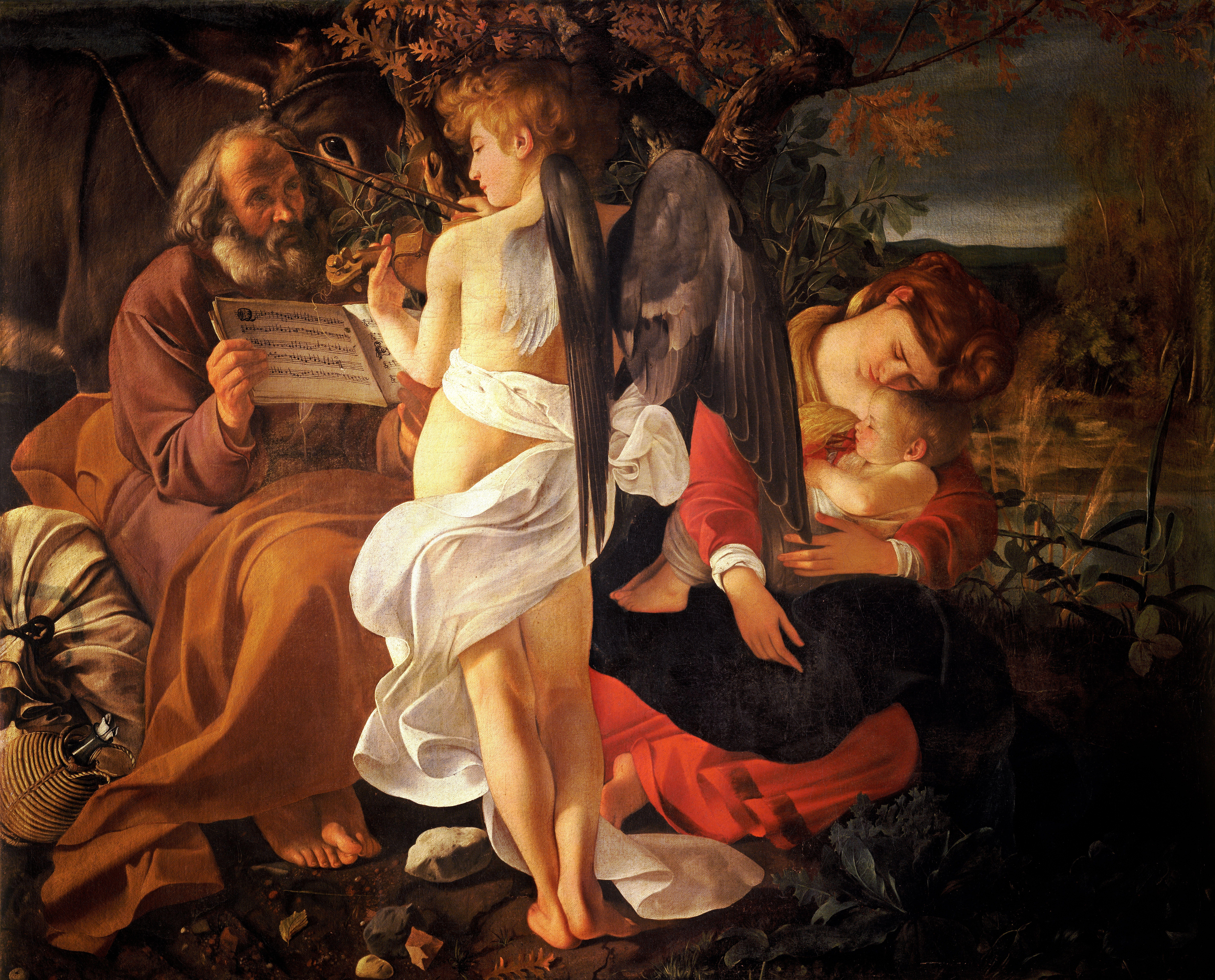
Caravaggio, Rest on the Flight into Egypt (c. 1597)
133.5 × 166.5 cm

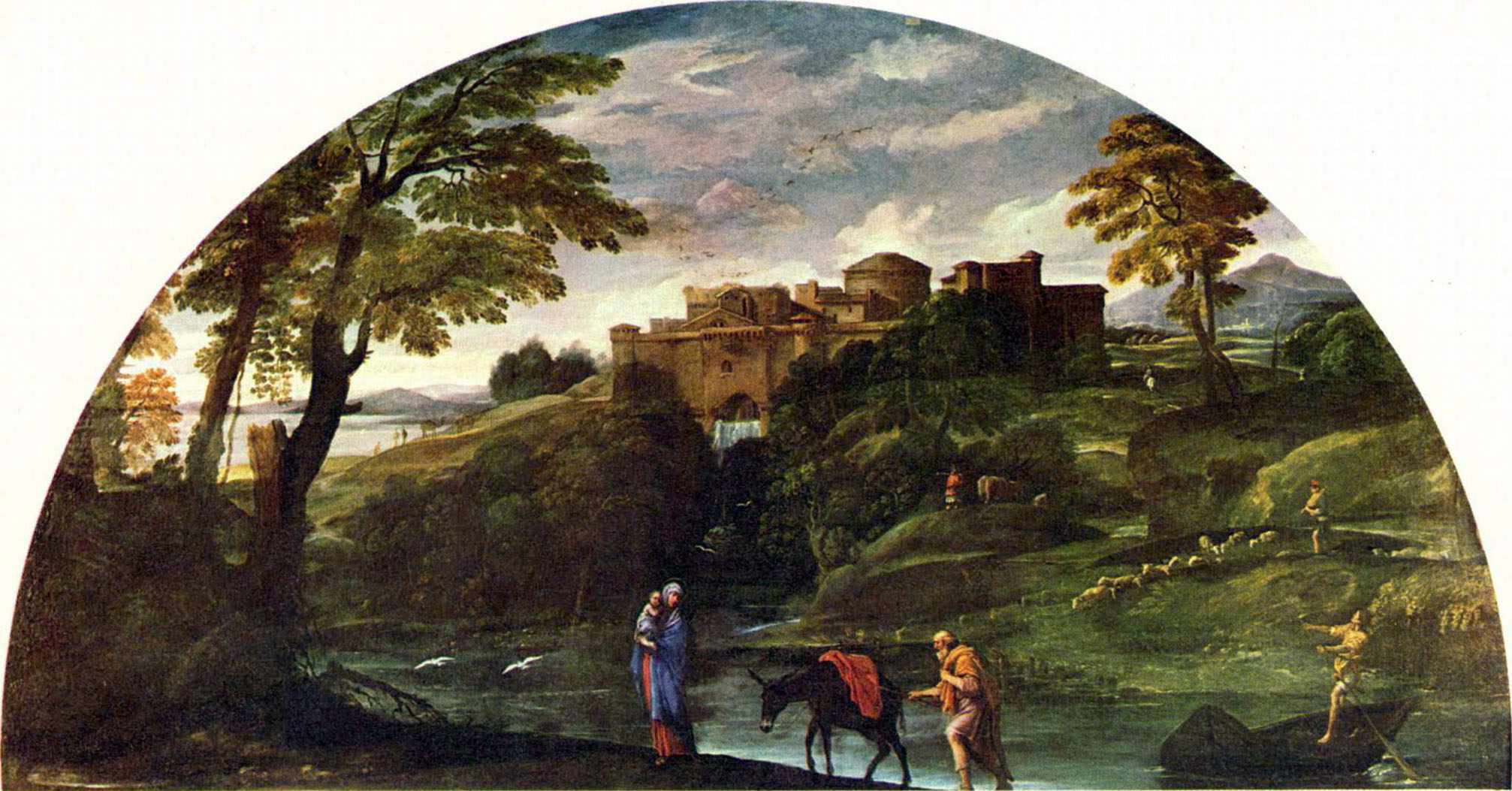
Annibale Carracci, Landscape with the Flight into Egypt (c. 1604)
122 × 230 cm

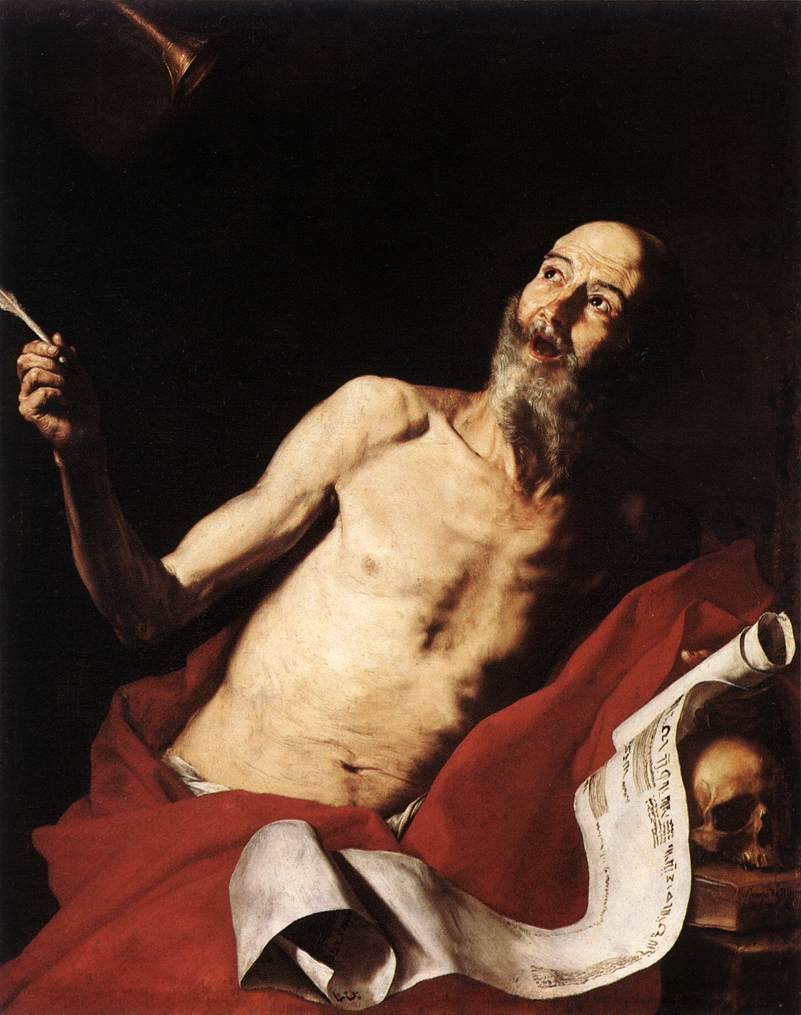
José de Ribera, Saint Jerome (1637)
128.5 × 102 cm

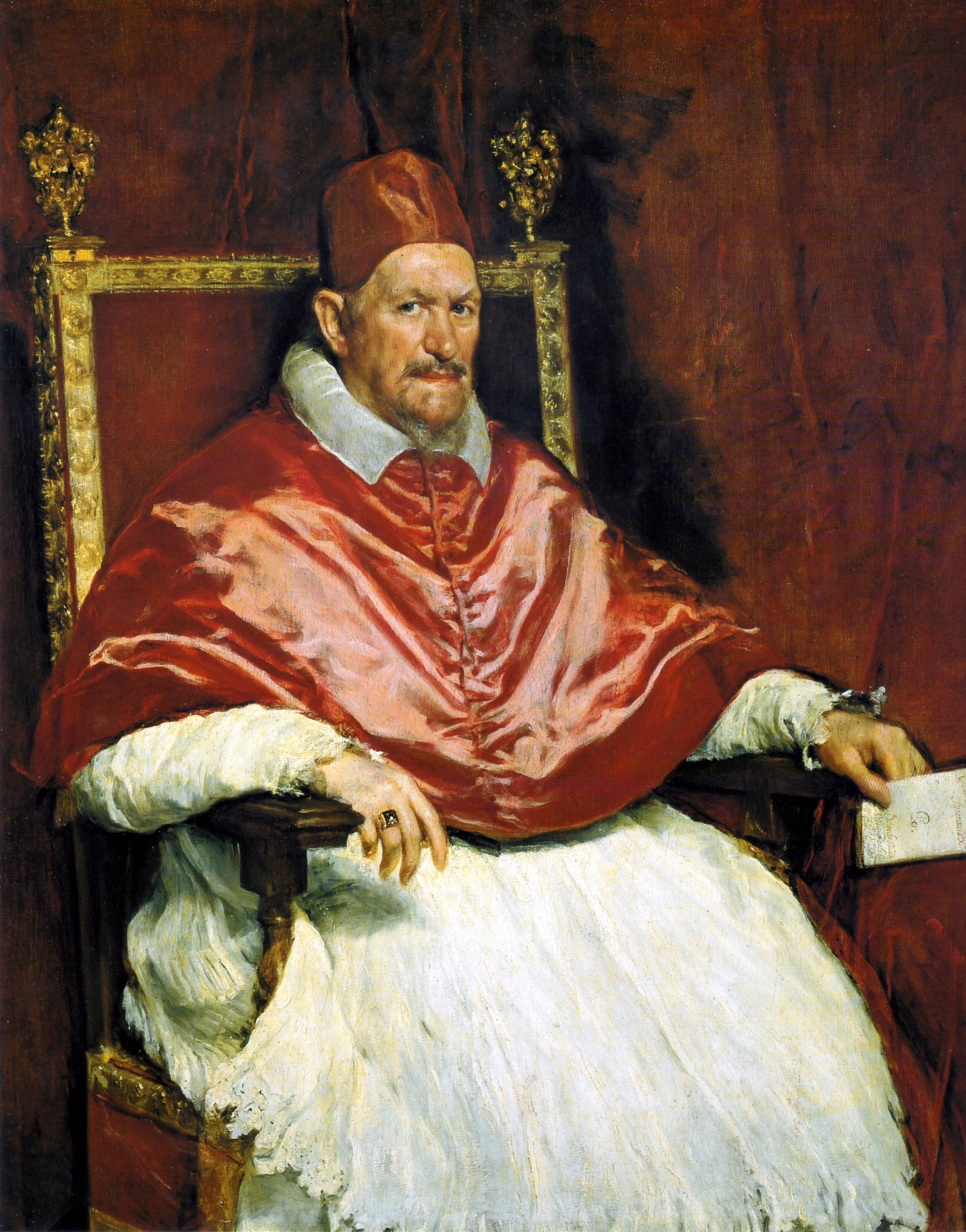
Diego Velázquez, Portrait of Innocent X (c. 1650)
141 × 119 cm
