= Giovanni Antonio Volpi =

Giovanni Antonio Volpi (1686–1766) was an Italian editor, publisher and poet.

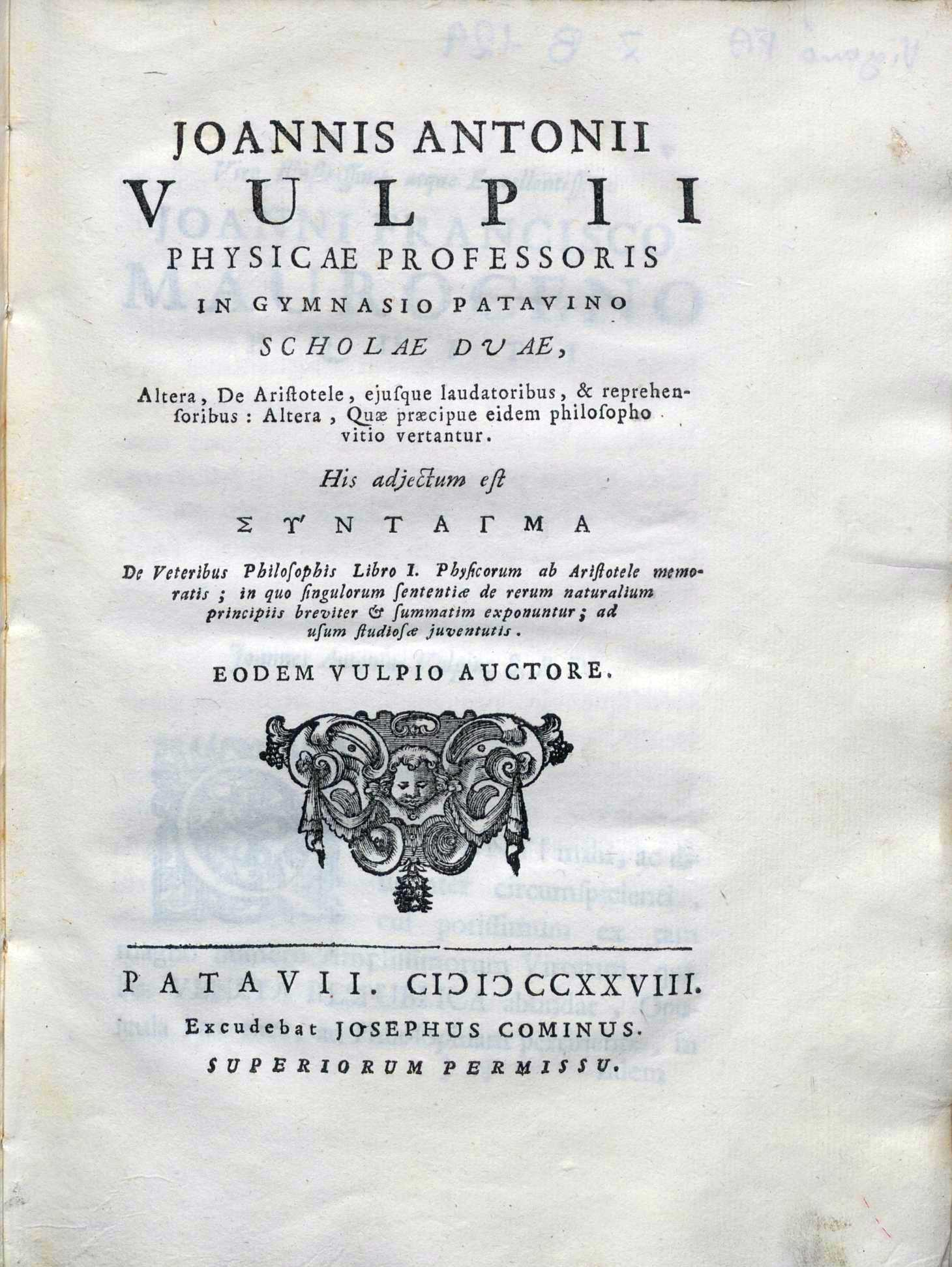
Scholae duae, 1728

He was born in Padua. In 1717, along with his brother Gaetano and the engraver Giuseppe Comino, they founded a publishing house and book shop under the name of Libreria Cominiana or Volpi-Comminiana. The print specialized in high quality classics. Volpi studied philosophy and rhetoric and became a professor emeritus at the University of Padua.

== Works ==
- Scholae duae (in Latin). Padova: Giuseppe Comino. 1728.
