= Doria Madonna =

Painting by Parmigianino

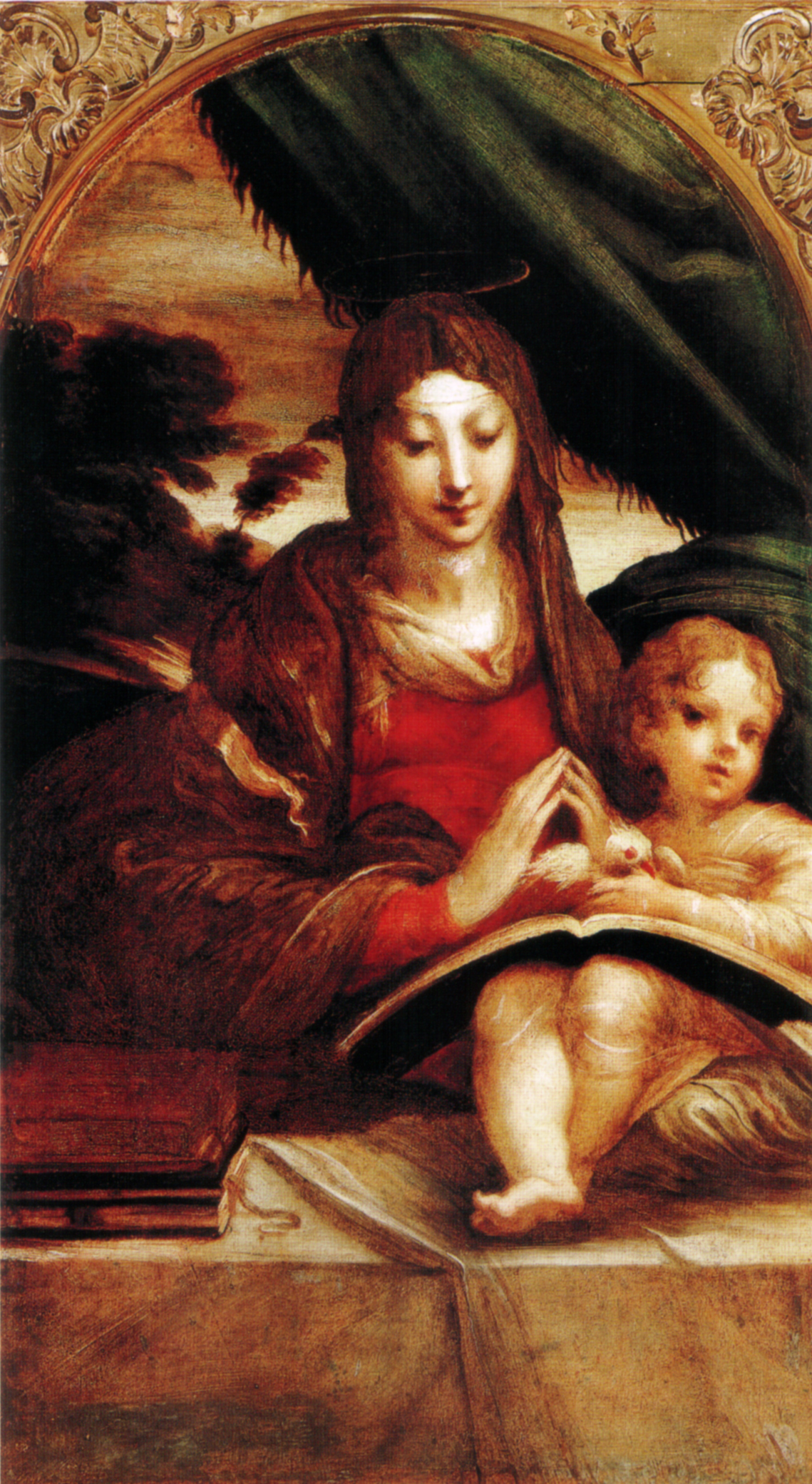
Rome version

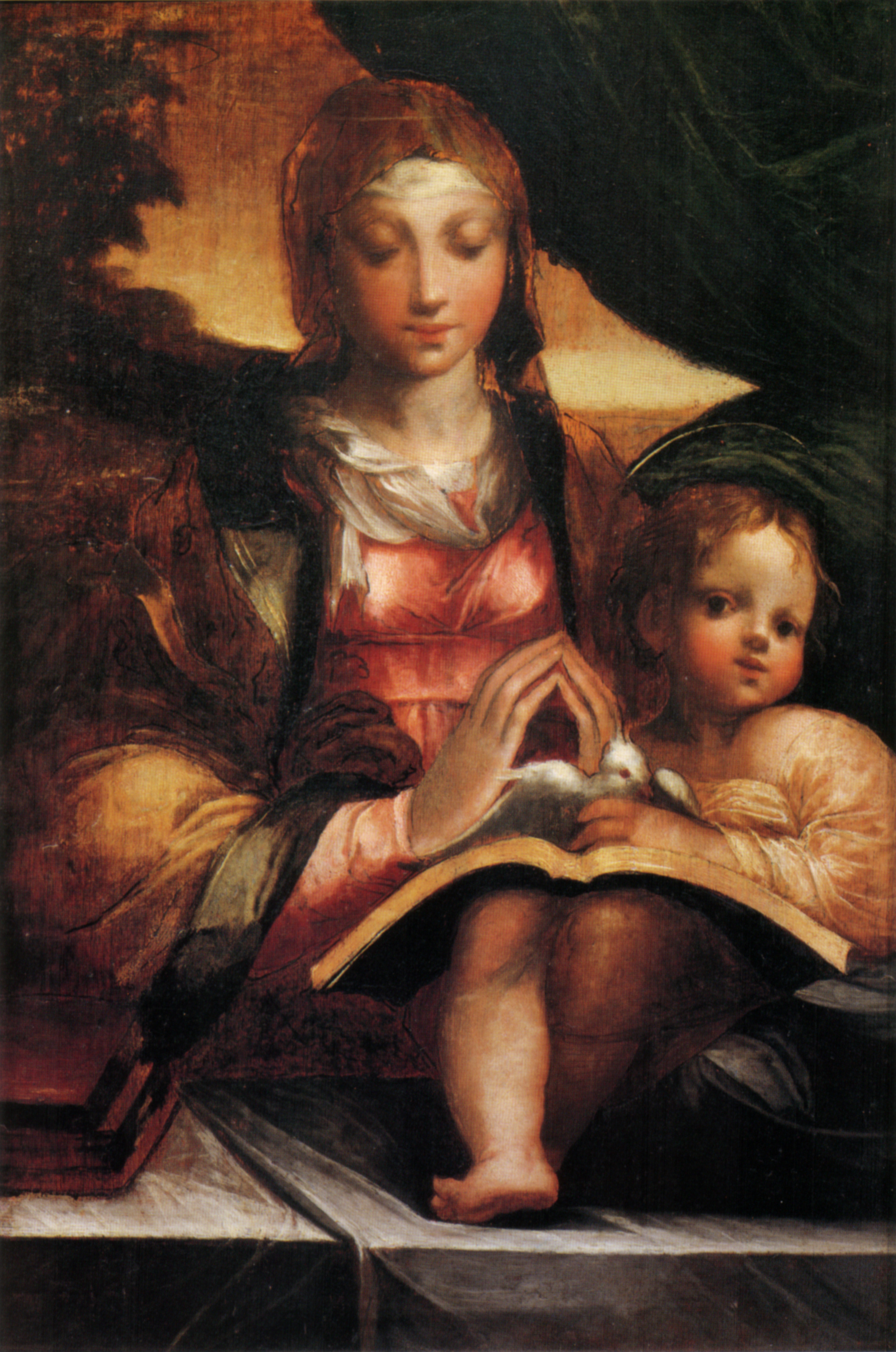
Uffizi version

The Doria Madonna is an oil on panel painting by Parmigianino, from c. 1525. It is held in the Galleria Doria-Pamphili, in Rome. Its shape and dimensions show it to form a diptych with the Nativity with Angels, kept in the same gallery. A smaller autograph version also exists in the Uffizi, in Florence.
