= Portrait of Febo da Brescia =

1543–1544 painting by Lorenzo Lotto

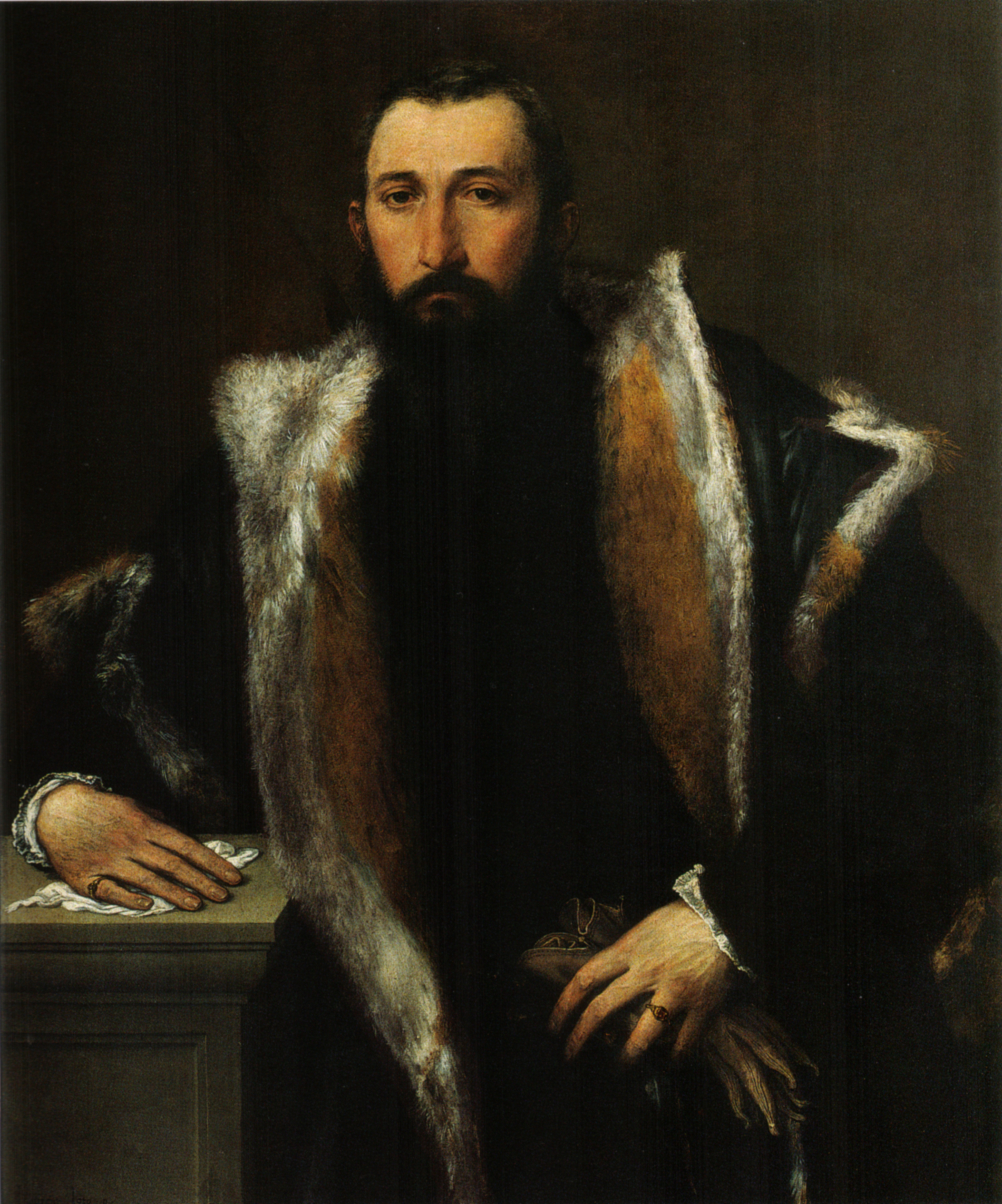
Portrait of Febo da Brescia (1543–44) by Lorenzo Lotto

Portrait of Febo da Brescia is an oil-on-canvas painting created in 1543–44 by the Italian High Renaissance artist Lorenzo Lotto. It is identified with the commission mentioned in the artist's account books in April 1543 from Febo Bettignoli da Brescia, a nobleman from Treviso, for paintings of himself and his wife, which were delivered in 1544. After Febo's death in 1547 both paintings passed to his wife's heirs and remained with them until her family died out in the 19th century. In 1859, via the painter Francesco Hayez, the Pinacoteca di Brera in Milan acquired the portraits.
