= Joshua's Battle against the Amalekites =

Painting by Nicolas Poussin

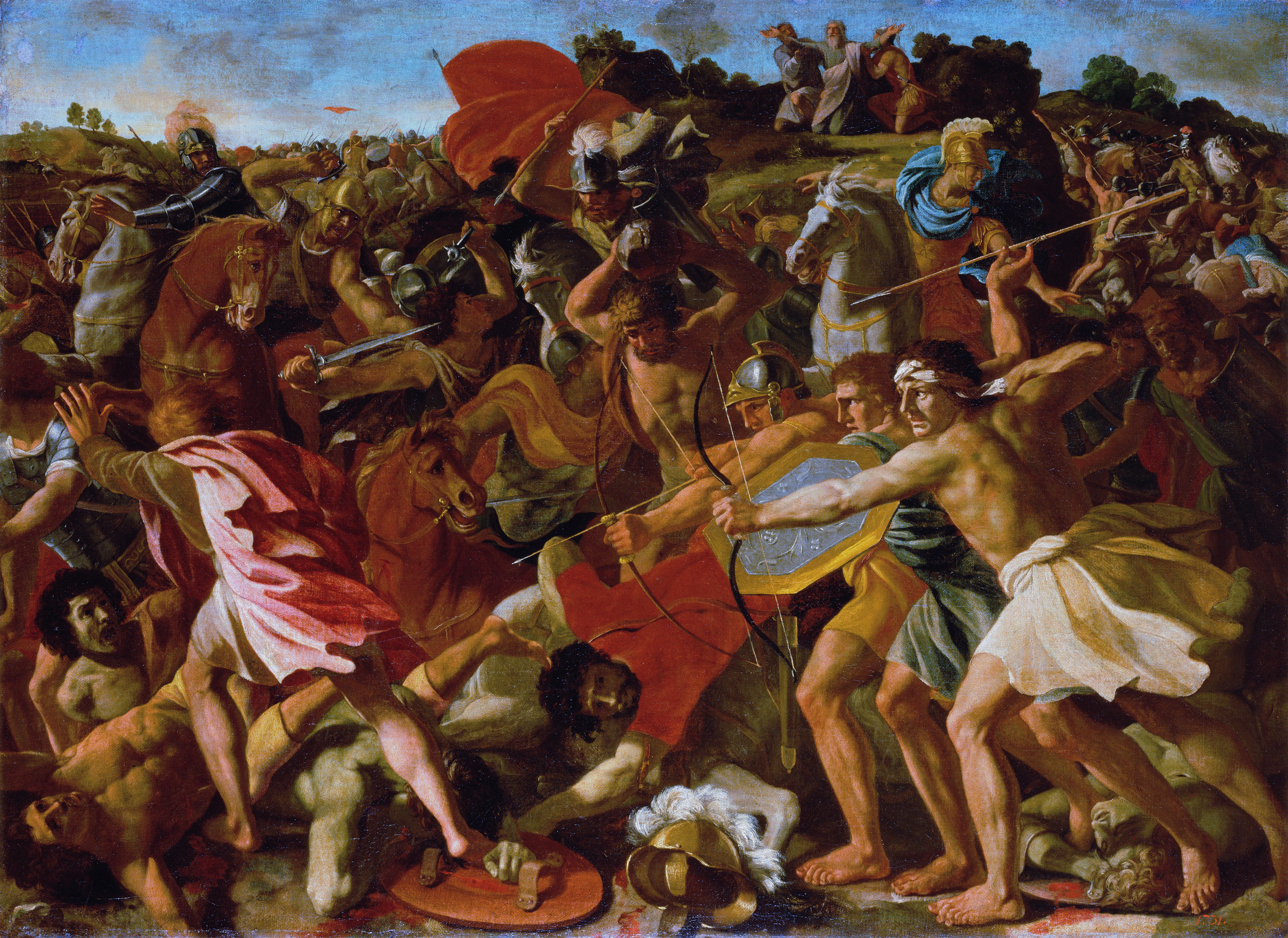
The Victory of Joshua over the Amalekites (c. 1625) by Nicolas Poussin

Joshua's Battle Against the Amalekites or Joshua's Victory over the Amalekites is a c. 1625 oil-on-canvas painting by the French artist Nicolas Poussin, now in the Hermitage Museum in Saint Petersburg.

It was produced as a pendant to The Battle between the Israelites and the Amorites by the same artist during his time in Rome. He fell into dire financial straits after the 1625 death of his patron, the poet Giovan Battista Marino and Cardinal Francesco Barberini's departure from the city - this forced him to sell both works. They were both later acquired by Catherine II of Russia to be kept in Poussin's cousin Gaspard Dughet's home on via Paolina in Rome. The pair was split up in 1927.

== See also ==
- List of paintings by Nicolas Poussin

== Bibliography ==
- Carl Villis (2012). Poussin : the Crossing of the Red Sea: a conservation project (in French). Melbourne: National Gallery of Victoria.
