= Valmontone =

Municipality in the Metropolitan City of Rome

- Comune
- Comune di Valmontone
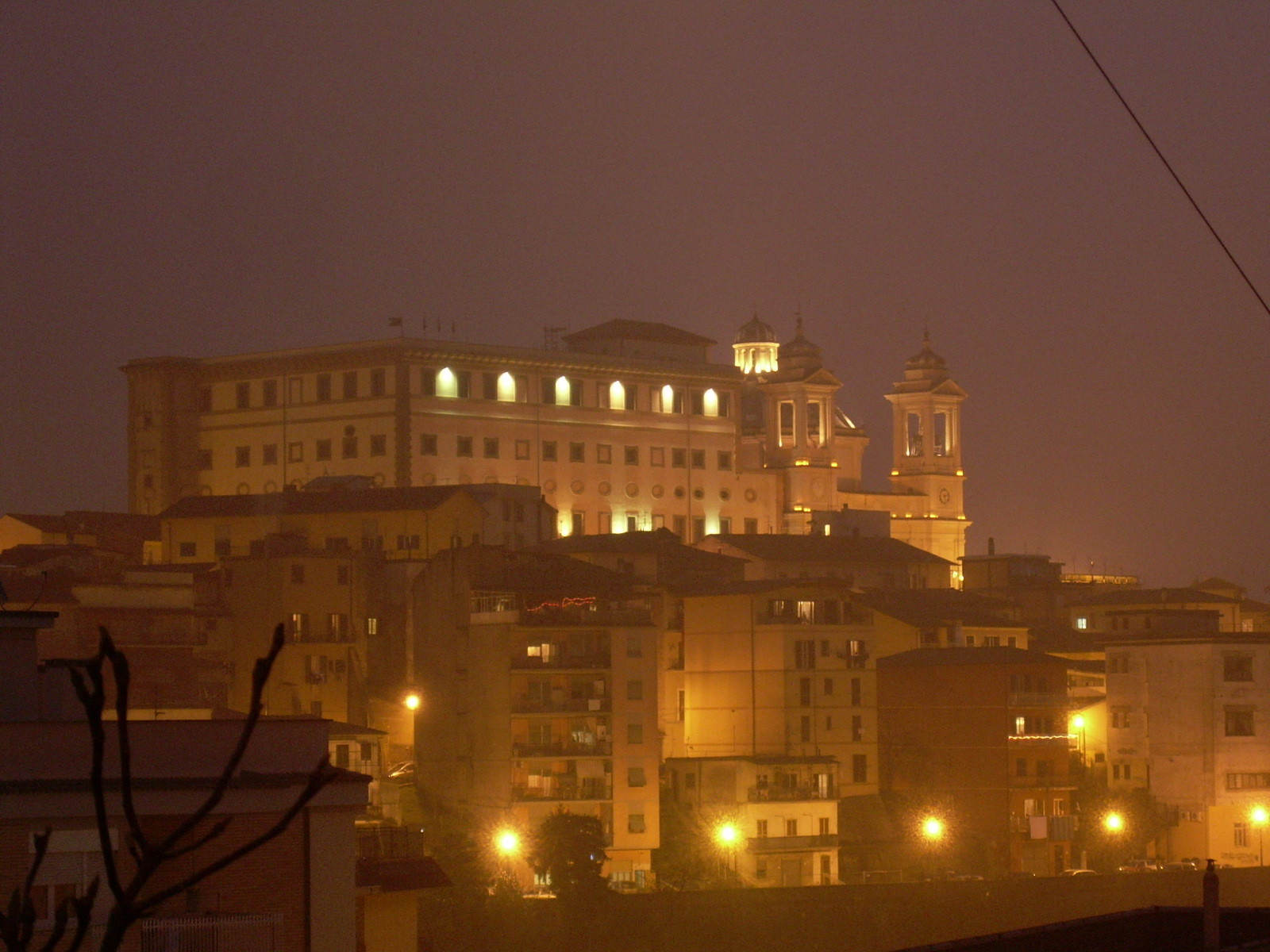
- Valmontone by night

- Coat of arms

- Location within Italy Location within Lazio
- Coordinates: 41°47′N 12°55′E
- Country: Italy
- Region: Lazio
- Metropolitan city: Rome (RM)

Government
  - Mayor: Alberto Latini (Democratic Party)

Area
  - Total: 40.91 km^{2} (15.80 sq mi)
- Elevation: 303 m (994 ft)

Population (31 August 2021)
  - Total: 15,219
  - Density: 372.0/km^{2} (963.5/sq mi)
- Demonym: Valmontonesi
- Time zone: UTC+1 (CET)
  - Summer (DST): UTC+2 (CEST)
- Postal code: 00038
- Dialing code: 06
- Patron saint: St. Luigi Gonzaga
- Saint day: June 21
- Website: Official website

Valmontone is a comune (municipality) in the Metropolitan City of Rome in the Italian region Lazio, located about 45 kilometres (28 miles) southeast of Rome.

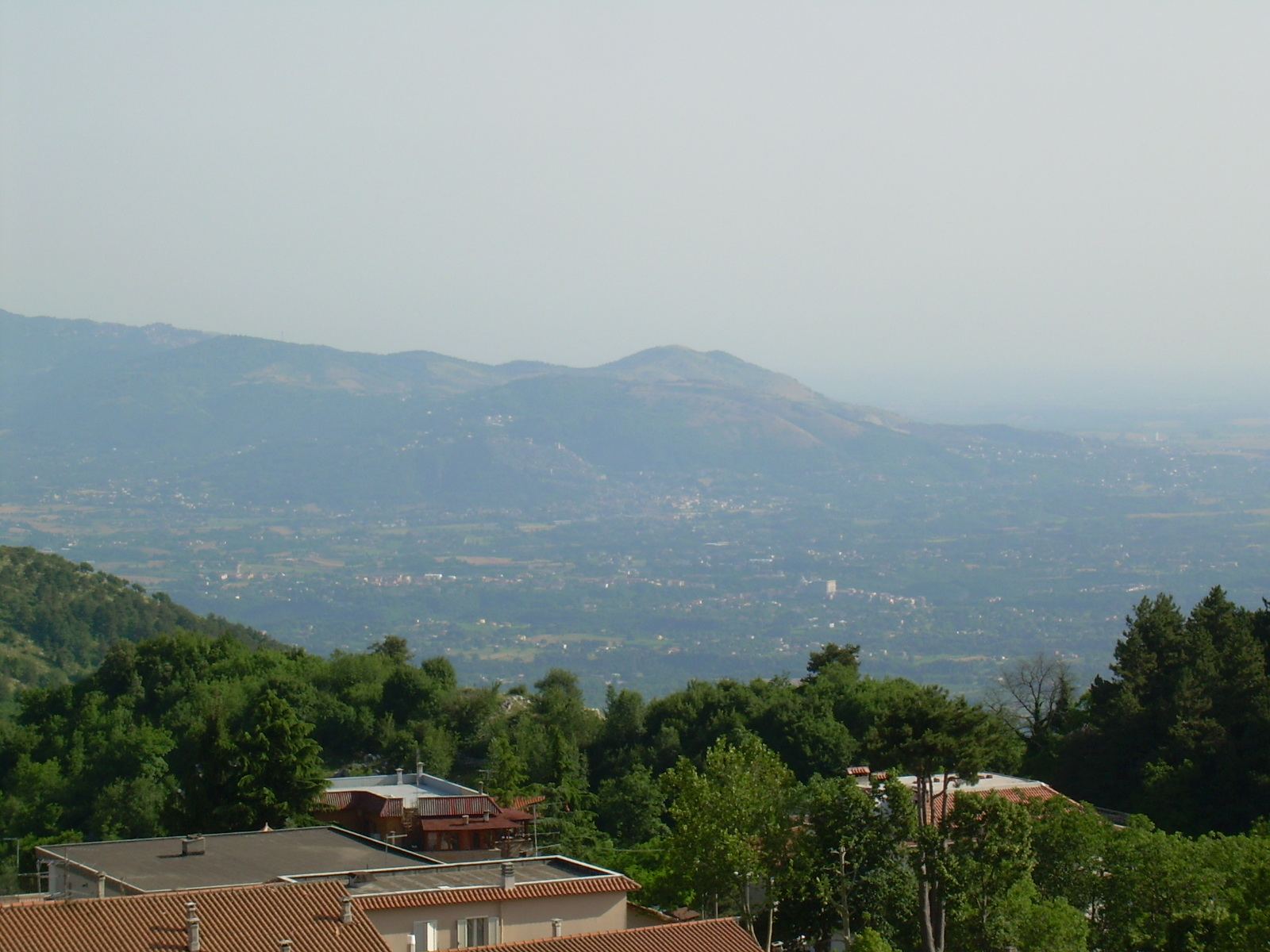
Valmontone seen by Rocca di Cave: the massive white building is Palazzo Doria-Pamphilj.

== Geography ==
The historic part of the town is situated on a tuffaceous hill, 303 metres (994 feet) above sea level, part of a morphological system of valleys and low relieves, known as Alta Valle del Sacco (High Valley of Sacco River). There are many natural springs due to the high water levels underground. Because of this, the landscape is covered by forest and farmland. To preserve this water system, in Valmontone exists the C.E.R.I., a center for the prevention and control of hydro-geological risks.

== History ==
The origins of Valmontone are uncertain: it seems that a village was founded before the rise of Rome on a hill in the modern municipality of the town, and its ruins were visible until the 18th century. Perhaps these are the remains of the ancient Labicum, which, according to the myth, was founded by Glaucus, Minos’ son: the name of the village derives from a kind of Greek shield. Labicum was in war against Rome, but at last it was defeated and became a Roman castrum, a fortified castle: other testimonies of the Roman period are the post-station Ad Bivium, situated along the road called Via Latina, a village of coal-makers, some furnaces for tiles and vases, a villa and some other remains (two sarcophagus, memorial plates).

Later on, the castle was rebuilt on the actual site in the Late Roman Empire. The presence of a Castrum Lateranense goes back to the 1052, while the name of Vallis Montonis (Valmontone means “a valley overhung by a little hill”) appears the first time in a document dated 1139. Valmontone became a fief under the Conti family until the 16th century, when, in 1548, the fief passed under the Sforza then, in 1632 and for a few years, under the Barberini, until Camillo Pamphili bought Valmontone (1634). The Pamphili family became Doria-Pamphili-Landi in the 18th century. In 1843 Valmontone assumed the rank of “city” by decision of Pope Gregory XVI.

On 22 January 1944, during the Italian Campaign of the Second World War, the Allies commenced Operation Shingle, an amphibious landing at Anzio in an attempt to outflank the formidable German defensive positions known as the Winter Line (also Gustave Line) and push toward Rome: Valmontone was an important objective on the way to Rome, in according to Operation Buffalo, May–June 1944. The Allies thought the German forces were garrisoning the city, so they bombed Valmontone with their air forces, nearly destroying it completely: Valmontone lost 80 percent of its ancient buildings, like the fortified gates, the monastery on Colle Sant’Angelo, fountains, churches. With the post-war reconstruction, the town lost its medieval and baroque appeal, of which only a few sights survive.

== Main sights ==
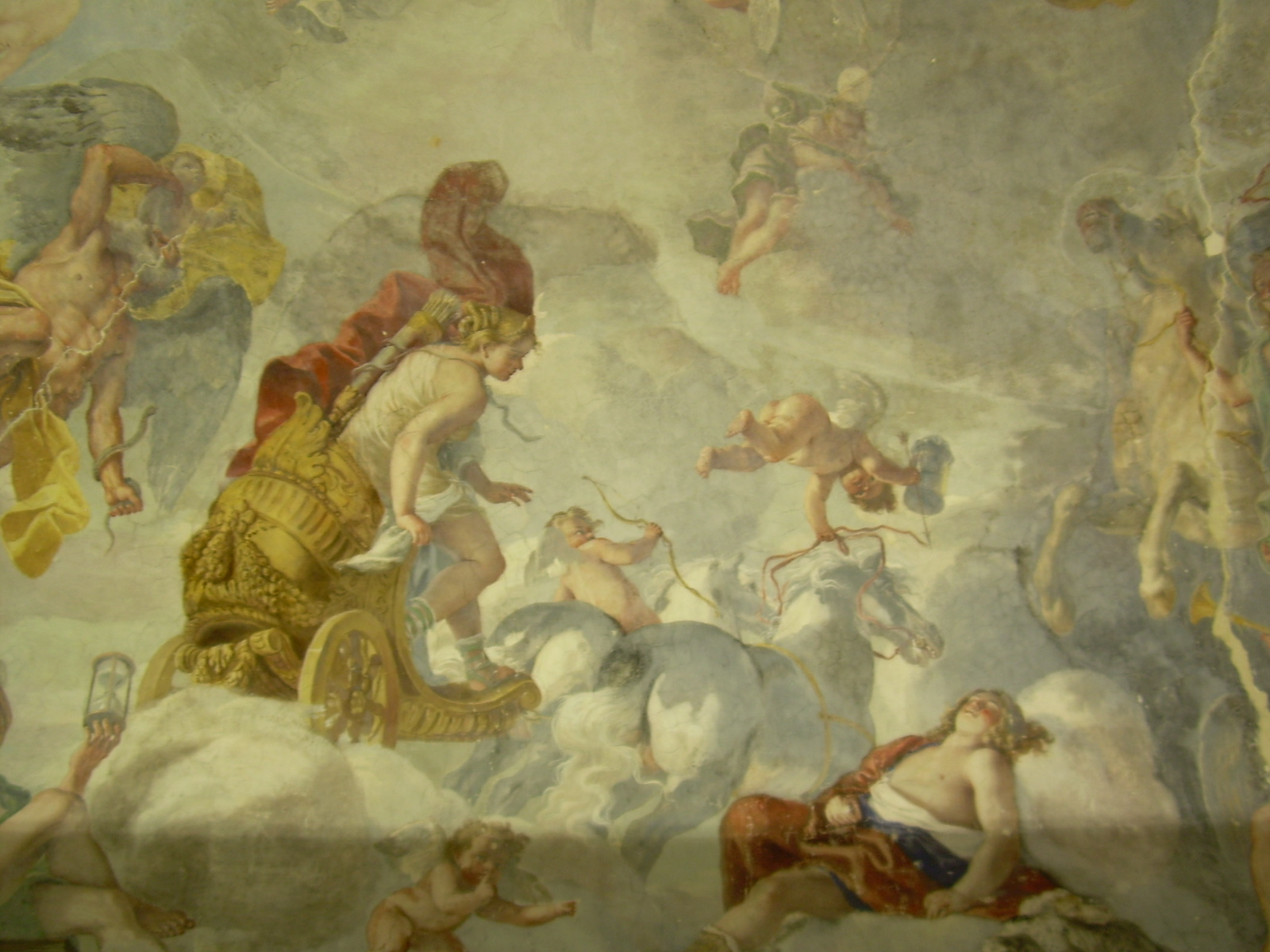
Mattia Preti, ceiling fresco of Stanza dell'Aria, Palazzo Doria-Pamphilij.

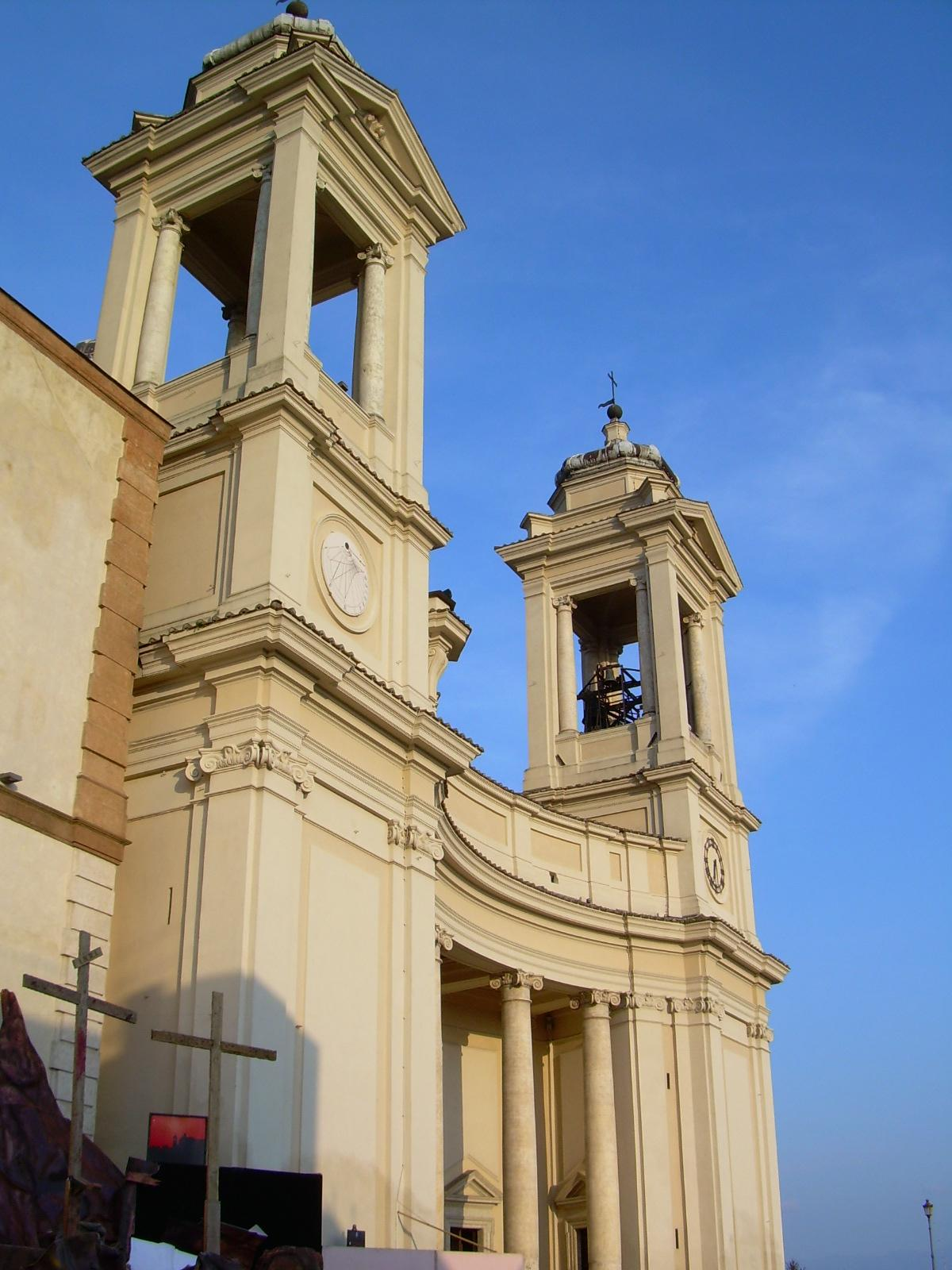
Colleggiata church.

- Palazzo Doria-Pamphilj was originally a fortified castle, until the Barberini decided to replace it with a bigger fortress. When Camillo Pamphilj bought the fief, he wanted to create a sort of “ideal city”, a Città Panfilia (Pamphiljan Town), including the palace, the nearby church and the other buildings (stables, warehouses, house, etc.): for this reason he called in Valmontone many important artists. On the Piano Nobile (the second floor) are frescoes divided by themes: the four rooms of Elements, the four dedicated to the Continents (Americas, Europe, Africa and Asia), the Sala del Principe and two chapels. The ceiling frescoes were made between 1657 and the 1661 by Pier Francesco Mola, Gaspard Dughet, Guglielmo Cortese, Francesco Cozza and Mattia Preti.
- Valmontone Archeological Museum, situated in the Palazzo Doria-Pamphilj. The ground floor houses a section which introduces the municipal area, the upper floor offers an introduction to the archeological sites and to related topics, through several media. Such topics include the coal miners' village in Colle Carbone, the "Colle dei Lepri" settlement, the "Mansio", the Thermal Baths and the "Colle Pelliccione" furnace.
- Collegiate Church of Santa Maria dell'Assunta, built on an ancient Gothic church (12th century) with the same name, under Camillo Pamphilj, in the 17th century. The architect was Mattia de Rossi, who rose to prominence under the mentorship of Gian Lorenzo Bernini: however, de Rossi was for this structure inspired by Borromini's design for the Roman church of Sant'Agnese in Agone. The church has a façade composed by two bell towers and a curved colonnade with four Ionic columns. The plan is elliptic, with four chapels along each side, including numerous Baroque pictures; in front of the main entrance, between two other chapels, is the apse with the altar.
- Fontana del Colle, in Baroque style, is part of the original Prince Pamphilj project. It is composed by a pedestal with four round-shaped basins, one at each angle, decorated with lions heads. On the pedestal is a column surmounted by the bronze statue of the Labicanus, a Roman warrior, symbol of Valmontone. This fountain was completely destroyed under the World War II bombings, except one of the basins and the pedestal: the structure was rebuilt in 1968.
- The Church of Sant'Antonio was not bombed during World War II, and is the last medieval building of Valmontone. The real name of the church is Santa Maria delle Grazie and was erected in the 9th century: the construction is made with blocks of tuff, with two closed windows, one of them decorated with a little arch. The interior is decorated with Baroque stuccoes, a Madonna with the Son and a Sant'Antonio Abate, both painted by anonymous.
- Colle Sant'Angelo hill houses the cemetery of Valmontone and the convent of Sant’Angelo: built on the ruins of a Roman sanctuary, it was also nearly destroyed during the last war, and rebuilt immediately. It was erected in the 8th century by the Benedictine Order, and includes some remains of the old monastery in the cloister and in the refectory: two bells, one of them of 1523, the other of 1744, are visible in the cloister.
- Sanctuary of Madonna del Gonfalone: this church was built in 1508, with a Gothic plan, out of the old town's walls. In origin, the sanctuary had 15 altars. Destroyed during World War II, it was rebuilt in the 1950s and the only original part is the renaissance’s portal with the pediment. The interior maintains as original the apsidal zone, with the main altar, and a fresco (1514) of the Virgin who nurses Jesus.
- Fortified wall's gates: before World War II Valmontone was home to three gates, though one of them, Porta Romana, in Renaissance style, was completely destroyed. The other two are Porta Napoletana and Porta Nuova: the first one was a medieval fortified gate, with two massive towers on sides, partially visible nowadays. The other one was erected on the Via Nuova by Camillo Pamphilj, in baroque style, as a gate on the road to the central town square on the hilltop.

Not far from Valmontone is the large Valmontone Outlet, a shopping center built like an American town, with squares, buildings, streets, a fake train-station, etc. Near this complex is Rainbow Magic Land, opened on 26 May 2011.

== Transportation ==
The town is crossed by via Casilina, a modern road following the ancient road with the same name built by the Romans, now the town's main street: moreover it is connected with the Autostrada A1 (Autostrada del Sole), on the Roma-Napoli branch (exit to Valmontone).

Valmontone has a railway station, served by the line Rome-Cassino-Naples.

== International relations ==
=== Twin towns – Sister cities ===
Valmontone is twinned with:

- Benifaió, Spain, since 1987
- Weiler-Simmerberg, Germany
- Goychay, Azerbaijan
