= Francesco Cozza =

Francesco Cozza may refer to:

- Francesco Cozza (footballer) (born 1974), former Italian football player
- Francesco Cozza (painter) (1605–1682), Italian painter of the Baroque period
