= Livio Mehus =

Italian painter

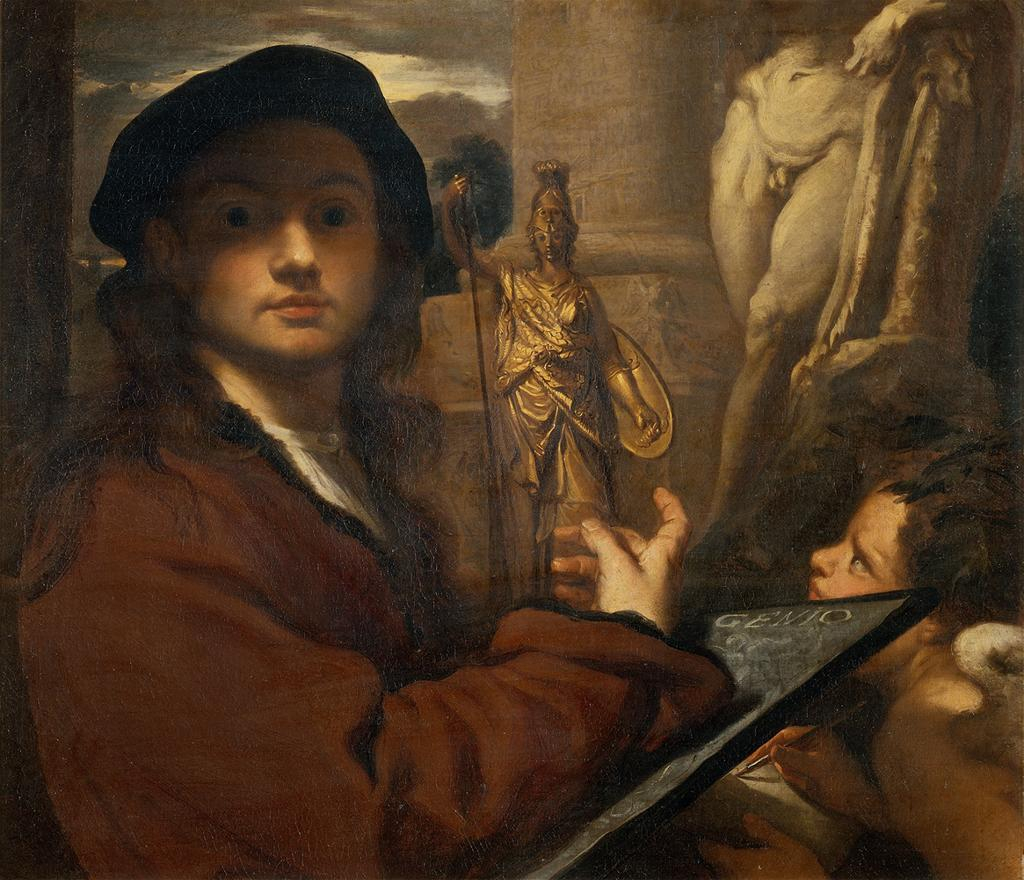
Allegory of sculpture with self-portrait

Lieven Mehus or Livio Mehus (1630, in Oudenaarde – 7 August 1691, in Florence) was a Flemish painter, draughtsman and engraver of the Baroque period, who trained and worked in Italy. He was mainly active in Florence where he was court painter of Prince Mattias de' Medici. During his lifetime he enjoyed a high reputation for his allegorical and mythological scenes, landscapes, religious works and portraits.

== Life ==
Livio Mehus was born in Oudenaarde in Flanders in 1630 as Lieven Mehus. In the 16th century Oudenaarde had been a prosperous city thanks to its tapestry industry but had since suffered from a long-time economic slump mainly caused by the wars ravaging the Southern Netherlands regularly. Livio Mehus' father left Oudenaarde to seek his luck abroad. He went to Milan leaving his young son behind in the care of family. When Livio was 10 years old he was called by his father to join him in Milan.

In Milan Livio trained with an obscure Flemish or Dutch battle and landscape painter who is known by the name Carlo Fiammingo. Some art historians have identified this artist with Karel Philips Spierincks, a Flemish landscape painter from Brussels who achieved a measure of success but died young in Rome. At the age of 15 Livio left on his own for a trip to Rome. Before reaching Rome he passed through Pistoia where his talent was recognized. He was introduced to a powerful patron, Prince Mattias de' Medici, the governor of Siena. Prince Mattias was the third son of the ruler of Florence Grand Duke Cosimo II de' Medici of Tuscany and Archduchess Maria Maddalena of Austria.

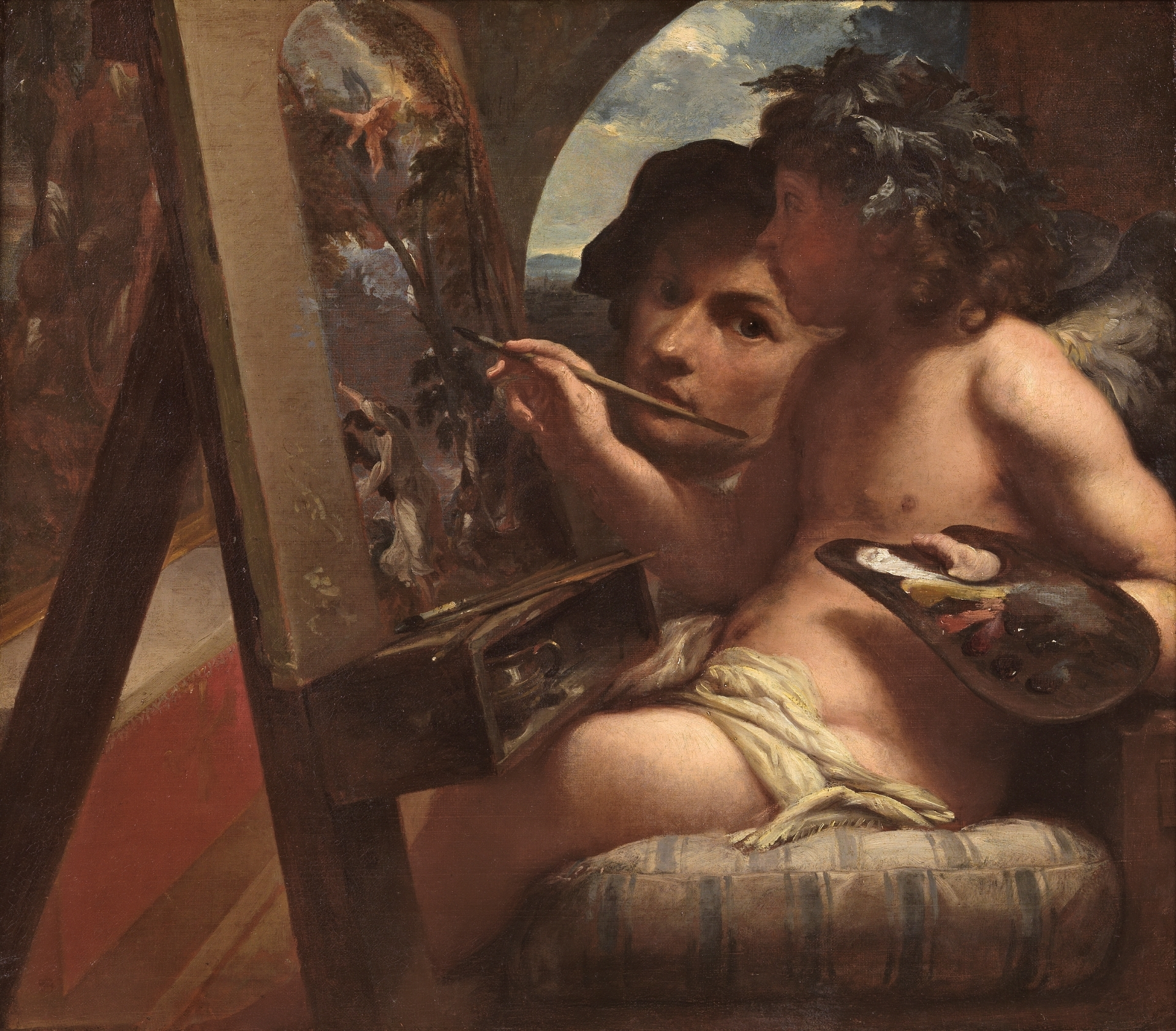
Allegory of painting

In Siena he took drawing classes with the local painter Guiliano Periccioli. After working in Siena for some time, Prince Mattias allowed Mehus to accompany him to Florence when he moved there temporarily with his court. In Florence the prince arranged for Mehus to work with the important painter Pietro da Cortona who had been in charge of the decoration of the Palazzo Pitti for a few years. After working and studying with Pietro da Cortona for some time, Mehus suddenly left Florence, possibly because of a conflict with his fellow artists in da Cortona's workshop, and set out on a return trip to Milan without even notifying Prince Mattias.

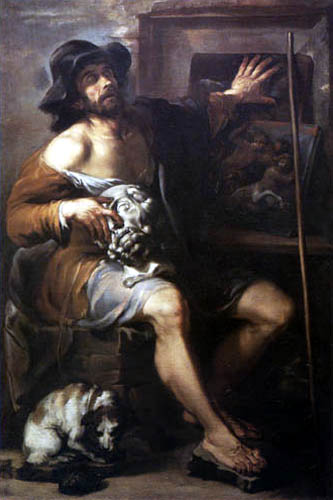
The Blind Man of Gambassi

According to the 17th century Italian biographer Filippo Baldinucci, Mehus served for about three years as a soldier in the wars against Spain in Piedmont and Lombardy. He returned finally to Milan where he reunited with his family and worked for a while. Here he was traced by Prince Mattias who invited him to return to Florence to work in his service. Back in Florence, Mehus got to know the Florentine engraver Stefano della Bella who had just returned from a long-term stay in France. In 1650 he was with della Bella in Rome where he again worked for some time with Pietro da Cortona and made studies after the Antique.

He spent about 18 months in Venice from 1650. Other visits to Rome (1655-1656 and 1661), Venice (1660) and Parma in 1673. He is recorded in Florence from 1678 until the date of his death in 1691.

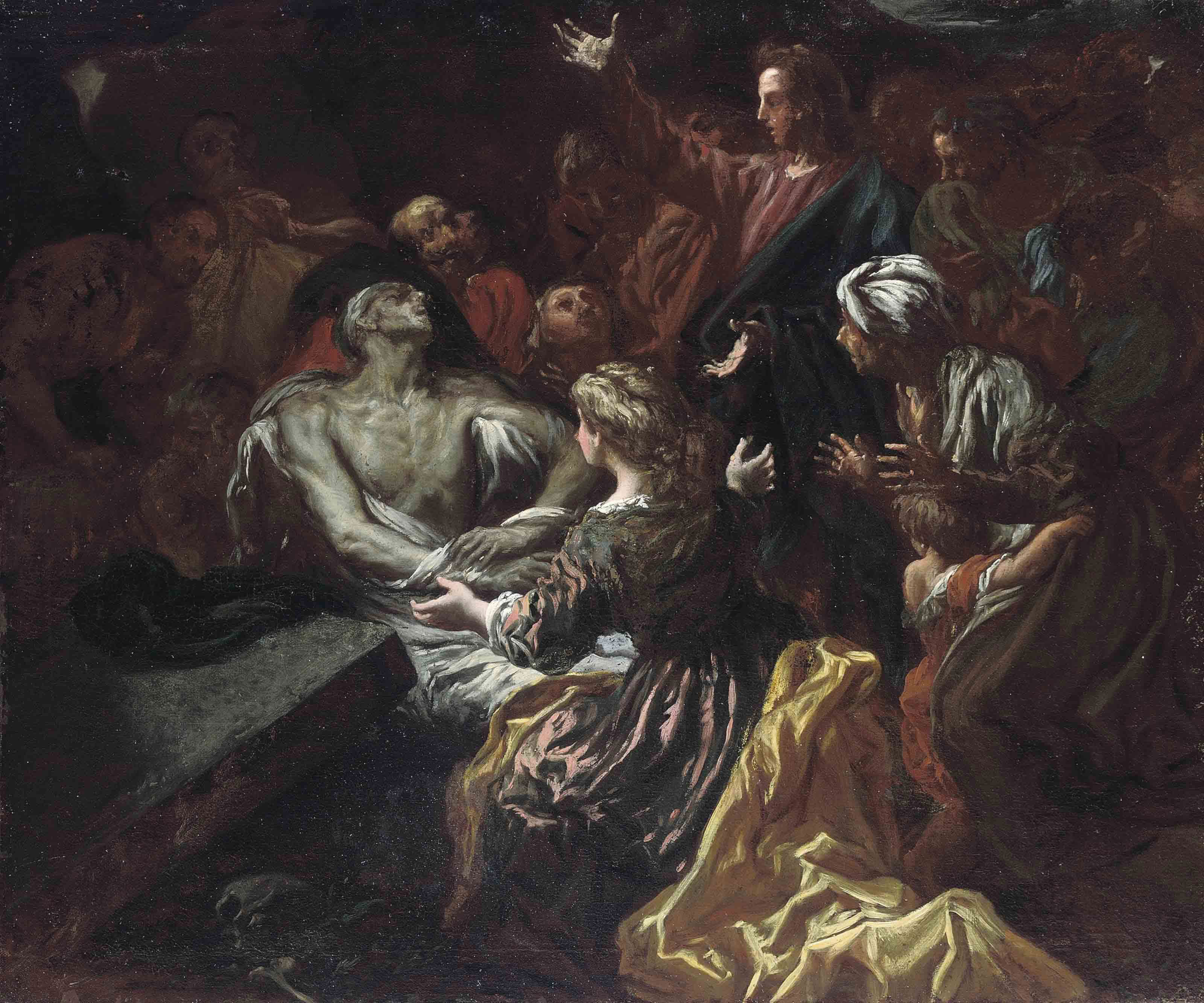
The Raising of Lazarus

He helped in the decoration of the cupola of the church of La Pace at Florence.

== Work ==
A majority of Mehus' works representing battles and landscapes are in private collections while various altarpieces and canvases with religious and mythological subjects are on display in churches and museums. He is also known for a few self-portraits and the portrait of the blind sculptor Giovanni Francesco Gonnelli, called the Ciego de Gambazo, demonstrates his strengths as a portrait painter and the portrait of Gambazo anticipates the best of what Giacomo Ceruti produced a generation later.

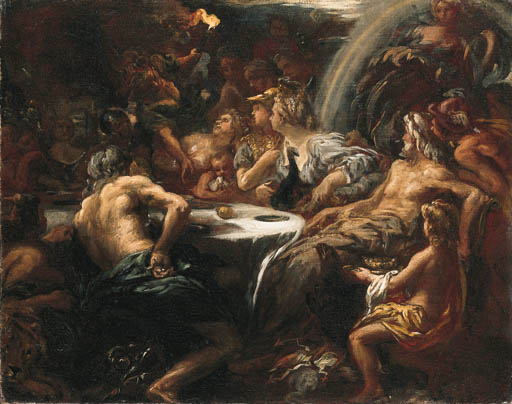
The apple of discord thrown among the gods

Livio Mehus was also sought out as a figure painter and painted the staffage in the landscapes of Crescenzio Onofri, a pupil of Gaspard Dughet. An example is the Landscape with gulf and port (Italian House of Representatives in Rome).

His best-known works are the pair of Genius of painting (Museo del Prado, Madrid) and Genius of sculpture (Palazzo Pitti, Florence) both painted c. 1650. The pair of paintings demonstrate his notions of excellence in art. When the Genius of painting was acquired by the Prado in 2000, it was attributed to Velazquez. In the first work, the youthful genius of painting is depicted making a copy of the now destroyed Martyrdom of Saint Peter by Titian. The child is thus learning his craft from Titian, in Mehus' time regarded as the epitome of the Venetian school of colourists. In the Genius of sculpture, the genius of sculpture is drawing a classical statue, thus extolling the primacy of ancient sculpture and the skill of drawing. In both works Mehus included a portrait of himself looking straight at the viewer, clearly associating himself with the qualities he most admired in art.

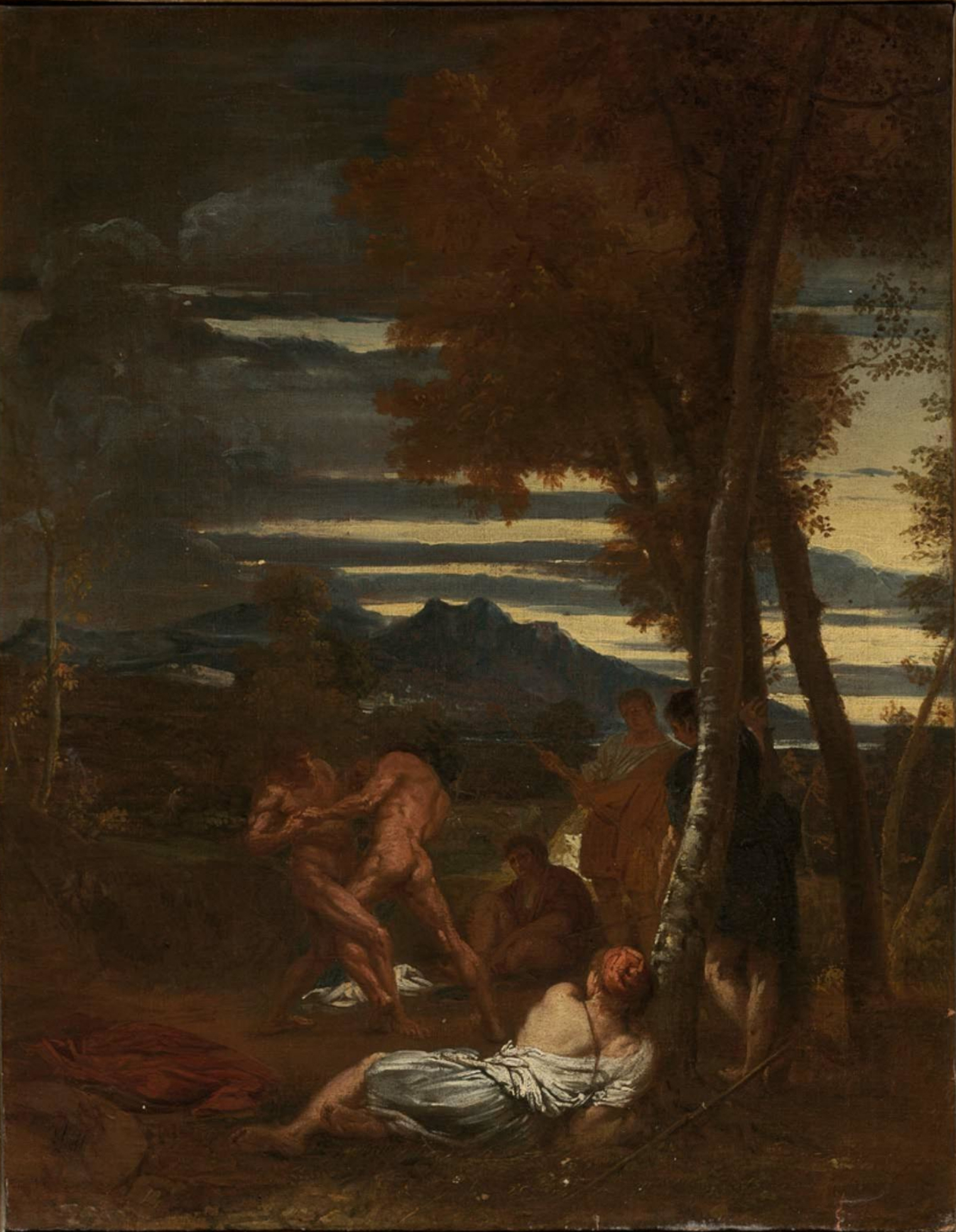
Wrestlers in a Landscape

Mehus was also known as a landscape painter. His landscapes often include mythological or genre scenes. Examples are the Wrestlers in a Landscape and the Huntresses Resting (both in the Museum of Fine Arts, Boston).
