= The Battle between the Israelites and the Amorites =

Painting by Nicolas Poussin

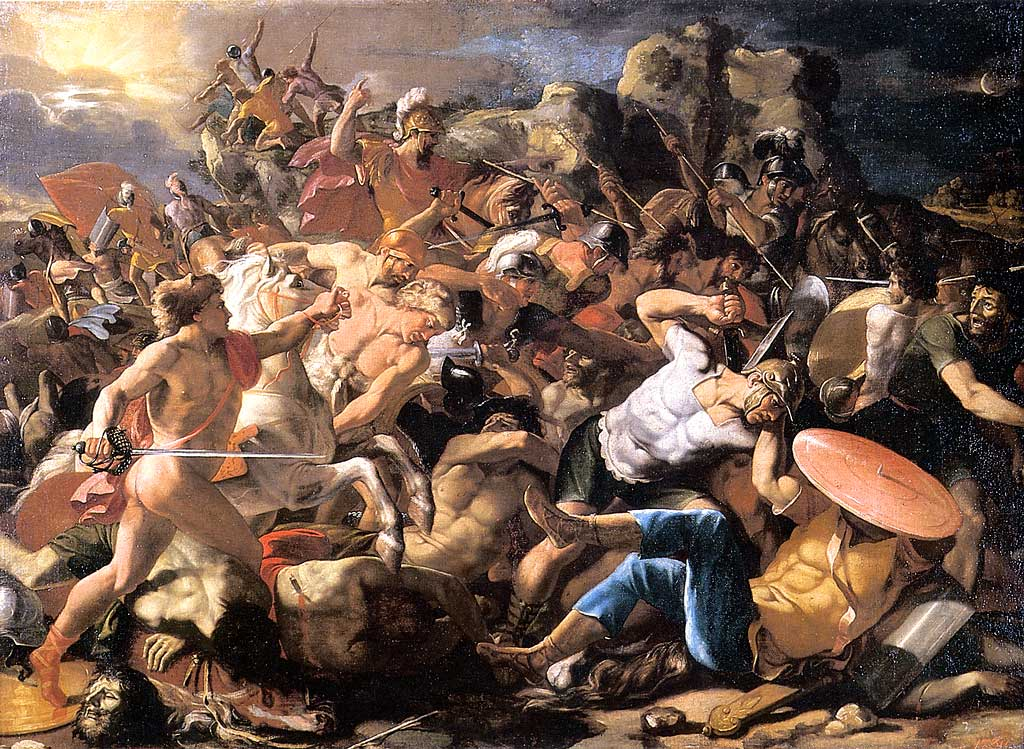
The Battle between the Israelites and the Amorites (c. 1625) by Nicolas Poussin

The Battle between the Israelites and the Amorites, Joshua's Battle Against the Amorites or Joshua's Victory over the Amorites is a c. 1625 oil-on-canvas painting by the French artist Nicolas Poussin, now in the Pushkin Museum, in Moscow.

It was produced as a pendant to Joshua's Battle against the Amalekites by the same artist during his time in Rome. He fell into dire financial straits after the 1625 death of his patron, the poet Giovan Battista Marino and Cardinal Francesco Barberini's departure from the city – this forced him to sell both works. They were both acquired by Catherine II of Russia to be kept in Poussin's cousin Gaspard Dughet's home on via Paolina in Rome. The pair was split up in 1927.

== See also ==
- List of paintings by Nicolas Poussin

== Bibliography ==
- Carl Villis (2012). Poussin : the Crossing of the Red Sea: a conservation project (in French). Melbourne: National Gallery of Victoria.
