= Crescenzio Onofri =

Italian painter

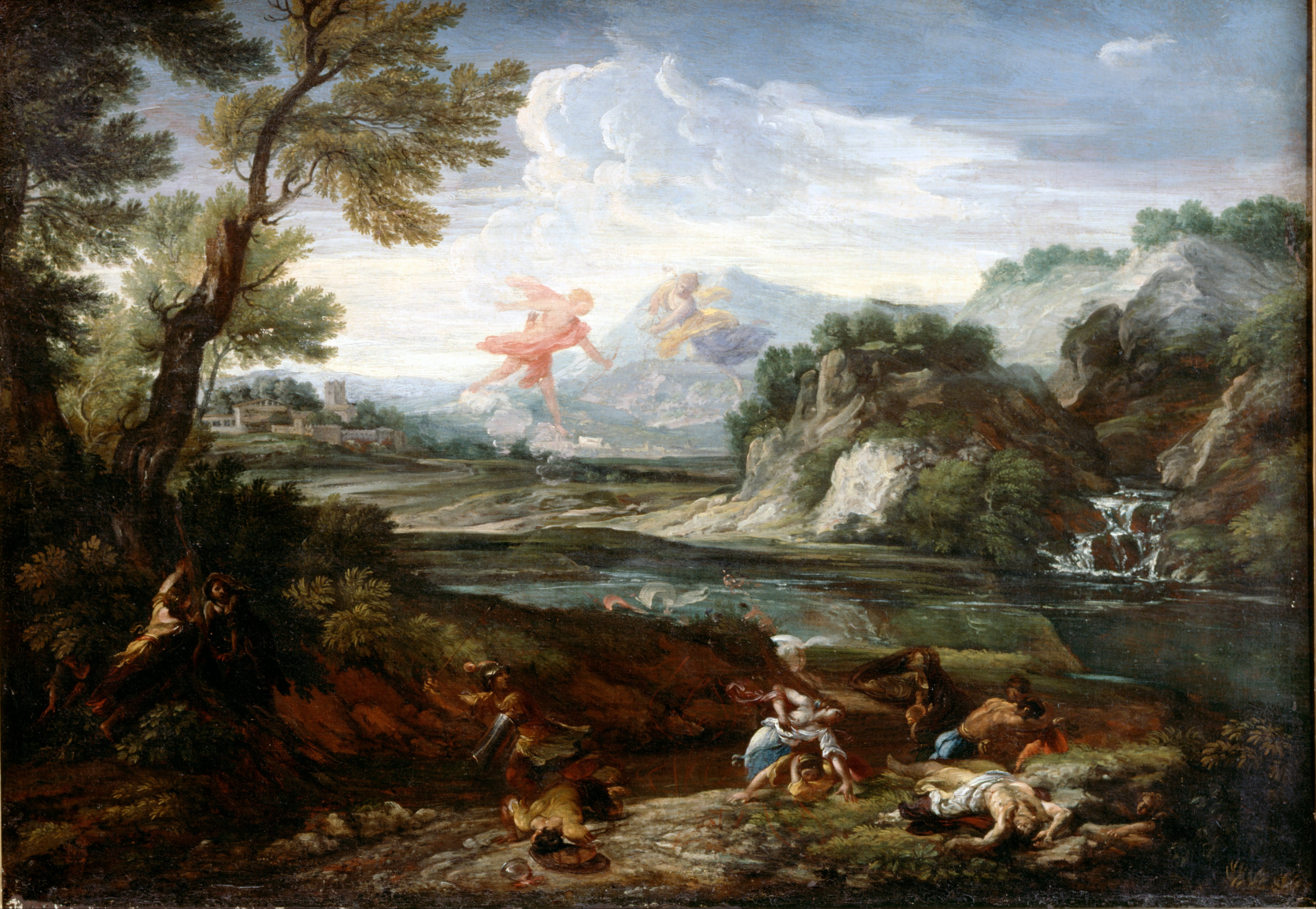
Destruction of Niobe's Children

Crescenzio Onofri or Crescenzio d'Onofri (Rome, 23 May 1634 – Florence, 1712/1714) was an Italian landscape painter, draughtsman and engraver who worked in Rome and Florence. A presumed pupil of Gaspard Dughet, he collaborated with many specialist figure painters of his time.

== Life ==
Information about Onofri's early life is scarce. Crescenzio Onofri was born in Rome, but the date of his birth is not entirely clear, and dates vary from 1630 to 1650.

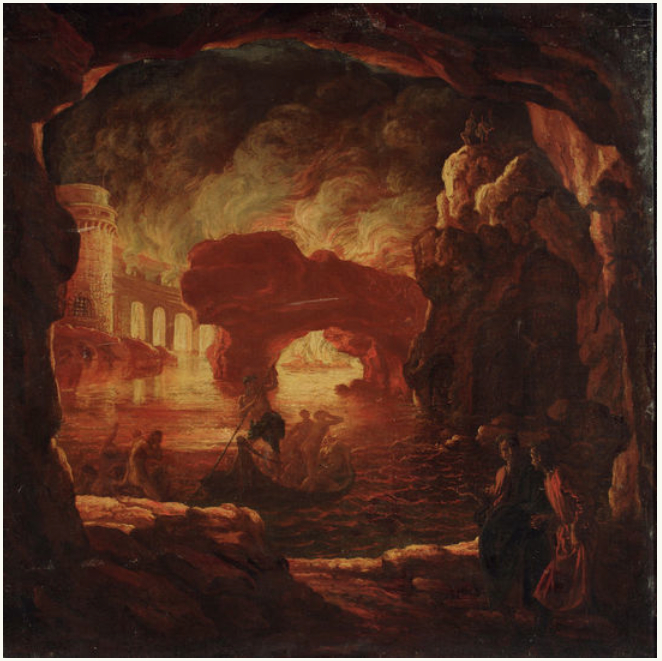
Dante and Virgil in Hell, with Livio Mehus

Onofri is believed to have been one of the few pupils of Gaspard Dughet. Dughet was a painter of French descent who spent his whole life in Italy, where he became a pupil of Nicolas Poussin and a prominent landscape painter of the Roman Campagna.

Onofri worked in Rome for at least 20 years. He was involved in many decorative projects in the residences of prominent Roman families such as Pamphili, Rospigliosi, Pallavicini and Colonna families. In 1675, he was listed as a member of the Accademia di San Luca, one of the most prestigious organisations of artists in Rome.

Onofri moved to Florence but art historians are not unanimous about the date of this move. Some place his transfer to Florence as early as 1689, and others in 1696.

He worked until his death in circa 1712 in the service of the Grand Duke. In this period, he is known to have collaborated with various artists who painted the figures in his landscapes, including Livio Mehus, Francesco Petrucci and Alessandro Magnasco.

== Work ==
Onofri was exclusively a landscape painter. He was one of the landscape artists whose style came the closest to Dughet's Roman work. Typical of Onofrio's work are his carefully balanced compositions, which go back to the model of the classical landscape established in the early 17th century by Annibale Carracci and his pupils and in which the narrative element is reduced.

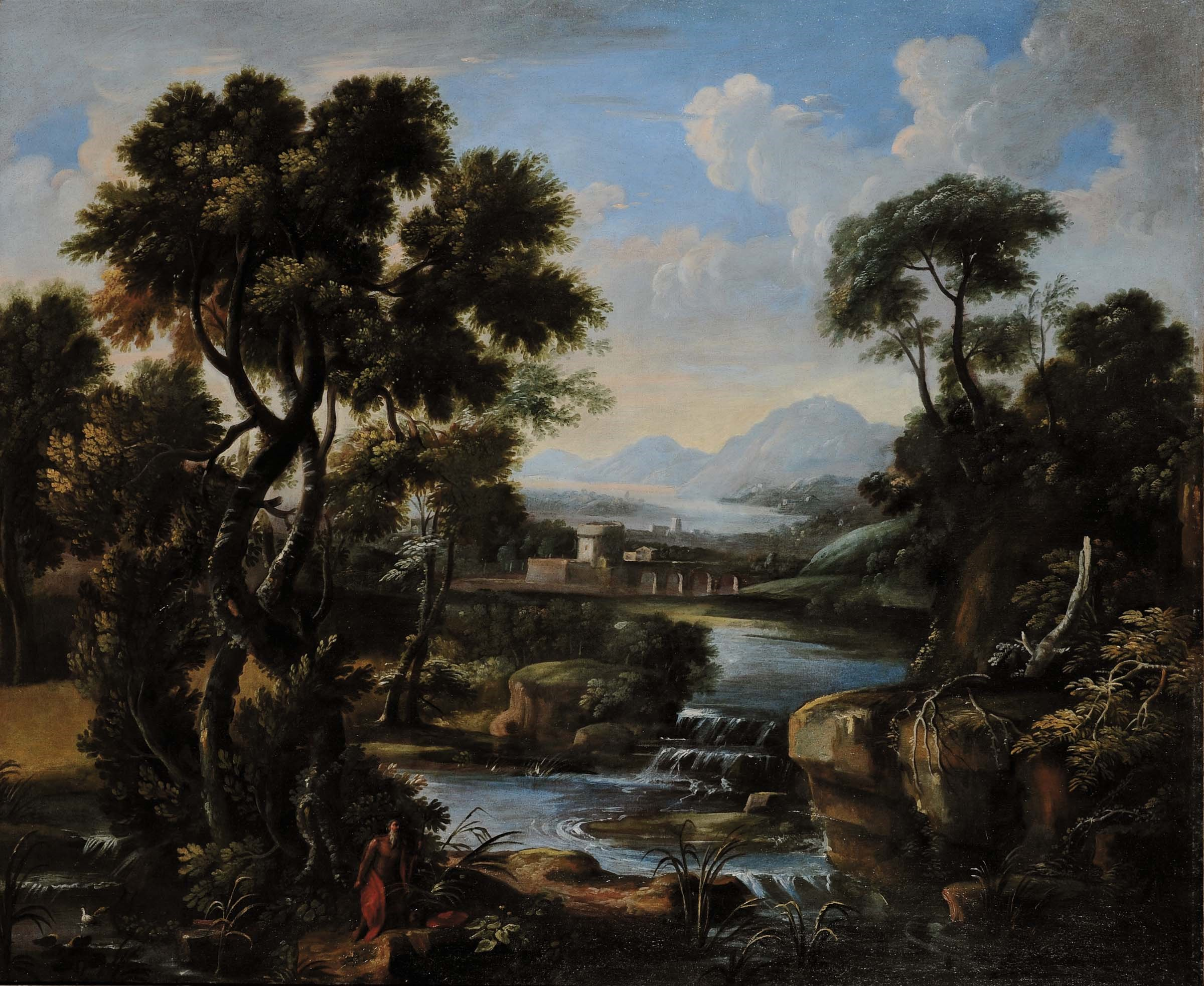
Landscape in Lazio with Hermit

The so-called 'ideal' landscape of the first half of the 17th century had, in fact, created compositional formulas that served as a model for numerous Italian and foreign artists. This style of classical landscape had an extraordinary development in the 17th and 18th centuries, as is illustrated by the works of Dughet and Jan Frans van Bloemen. The success and spread of this genre of painting were linked to the preferences of the market and the taste of private clients. Important masters practicing the genre included Pietro da Cortona, Nicolas Poussin, Claude Lorrain and Gaspard Dughet, the master of Onofri.

The numerous drawings by his hand demonstrate that Onofri was familiar with the works of the Bolognese artist Giovanni Francesco Grimaldi, particularly in his meticulous technique of representing the foliage of trees. In his later years, the artist evolved towards a looser and more painterly style.
