= Saint-Hippolyte, Doubs =

Saint-Hippolyte
- Commune
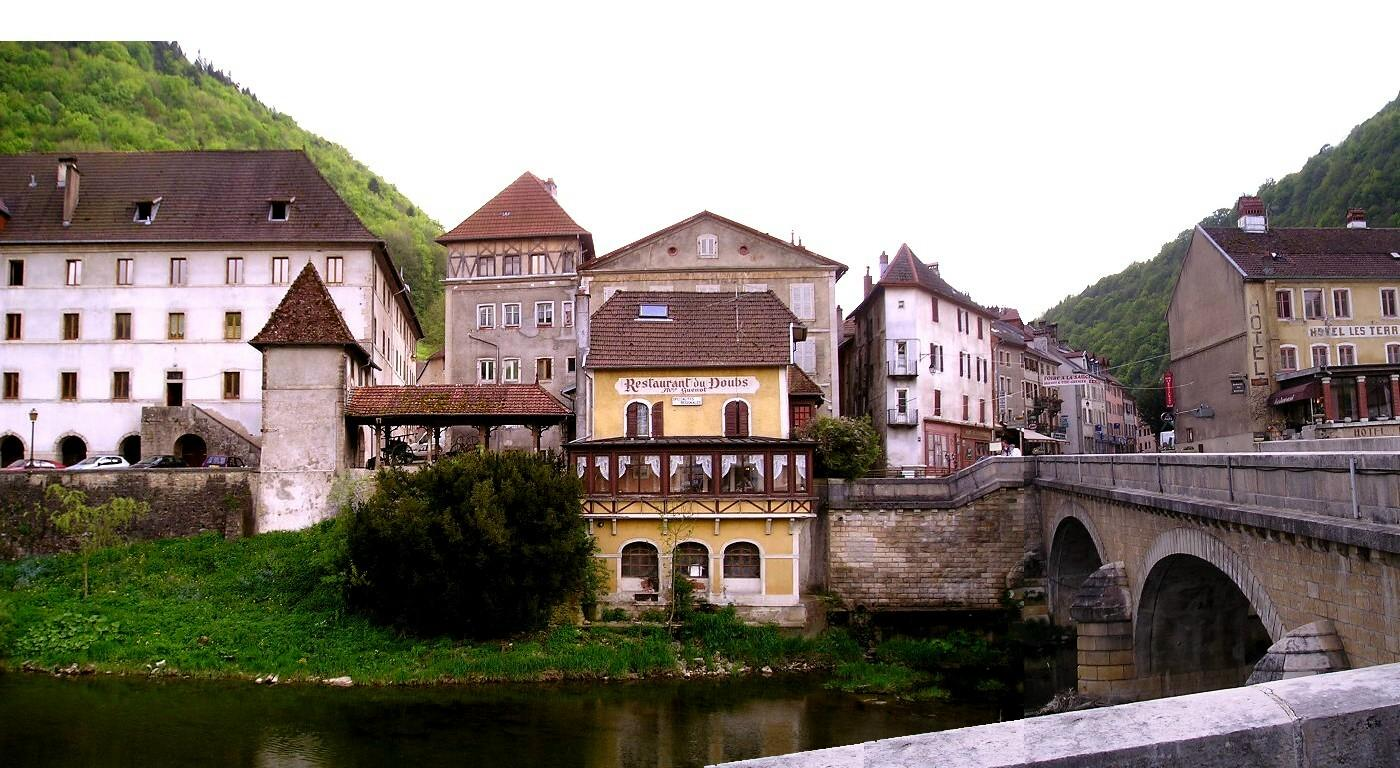
- The river Doubs

- Coat of arms
- Location of Saint-Hippolyte
- Location within France Location within Bourgogne-Franche-Comté
- Coordinates: 47°19′09″N 6°48′47″E
- Country: France
- Region: Bourgogne-Franche-Comté
- Department: Doubs
- Arrondissement: Montbéliard
- Canton: Maîche

Government
  - Mayor (2020–2026): Boris Loichot
- Area^{1}: 11.01 km^{2} (4.25 sq mi)
- Elevation: 382 m (1,253 ft)
- Highest elevation: 760 m (2,490 ft)
- Lowest elevation: 360 m (1,180 ft)
- Population (2023): 981
  - Density: 89.1/km^{2} (231/sq mi)
- Time zone: UTC+01:00 (CET)
  - Summer (DST): UTC+02:00 (CEST)
- INSEE/Postal code: 25519 /25190
- ^{1} French Land Register data, which excludes lakes, ponds, glaciers > 1 km^{2} (0.386 sq mi or 247 acres) and river estuaries.

Saint-Hippolyte (French pronunciation: [sɛ̃.t‿ipɔlit]) or Saint-Hippolyte-sur-le-Doubs is a commune in the department of Doubs, in the eastern French region of Bourgogne-Franche-Comté.

== Geography ==
The town lies 30 km (19 mi) south of Montbéliard on the banks of the river Doubs.

== Population ==
Historical population
Year	Pop.	±% p.a.
1968	1,277	—
1975	1,216	−0.70%
1982	1,179	−0.44%
1990	1,128	−0.55%
1999	1,045	−0.85%
2007	918	−1.61%
2012	899	−0.42%
2017	898	−0.02%
2023	981	+1.48%
Source: INSEE

== Personalities ==
Saint-Hippolyte was the birthplace of:

- Jacques Courtois (1621-1676?), Jesuit and painter
- Guillaume Courtois (1628–1679), painter and brother of Jacques

== Gallery ==
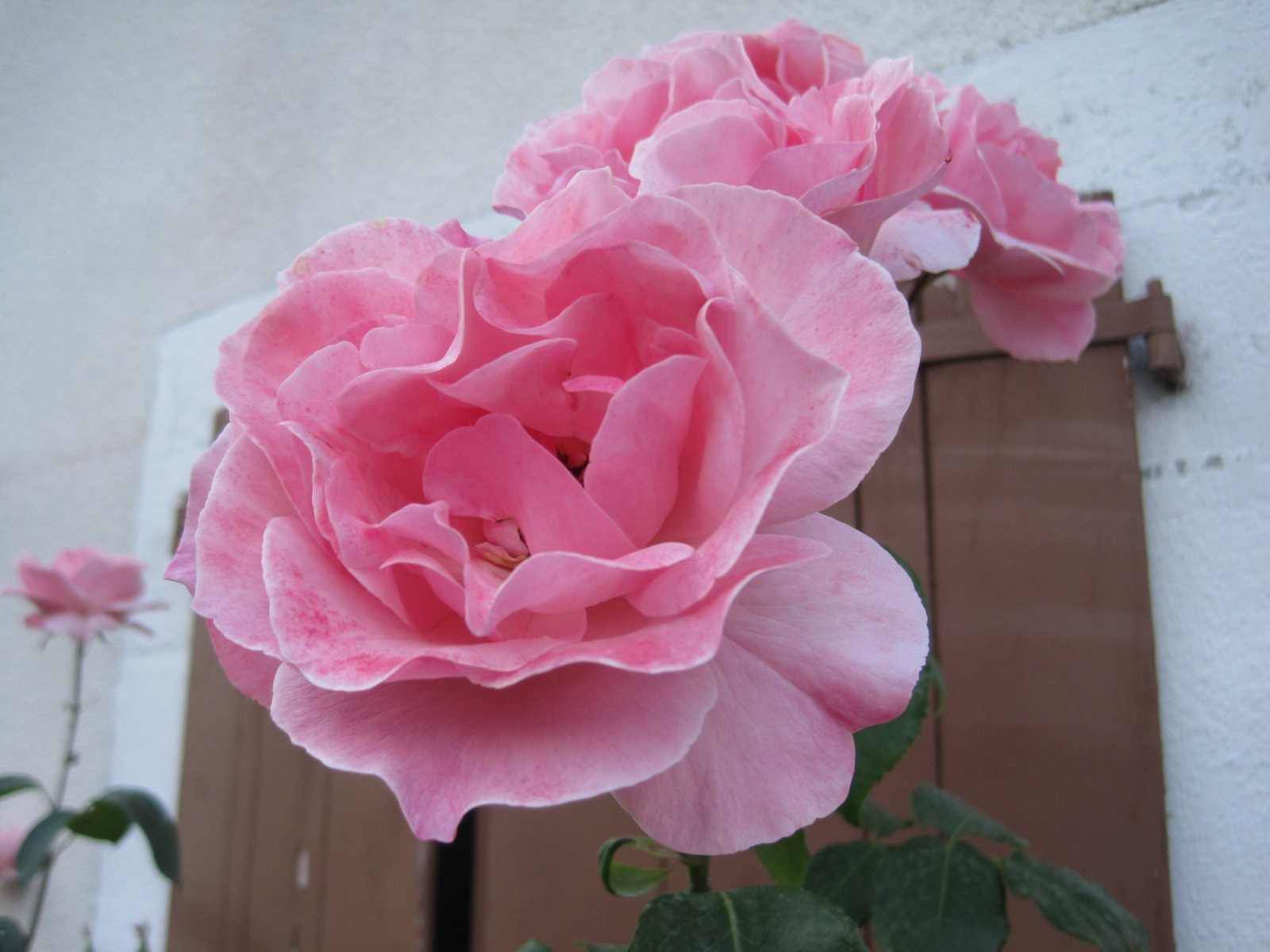

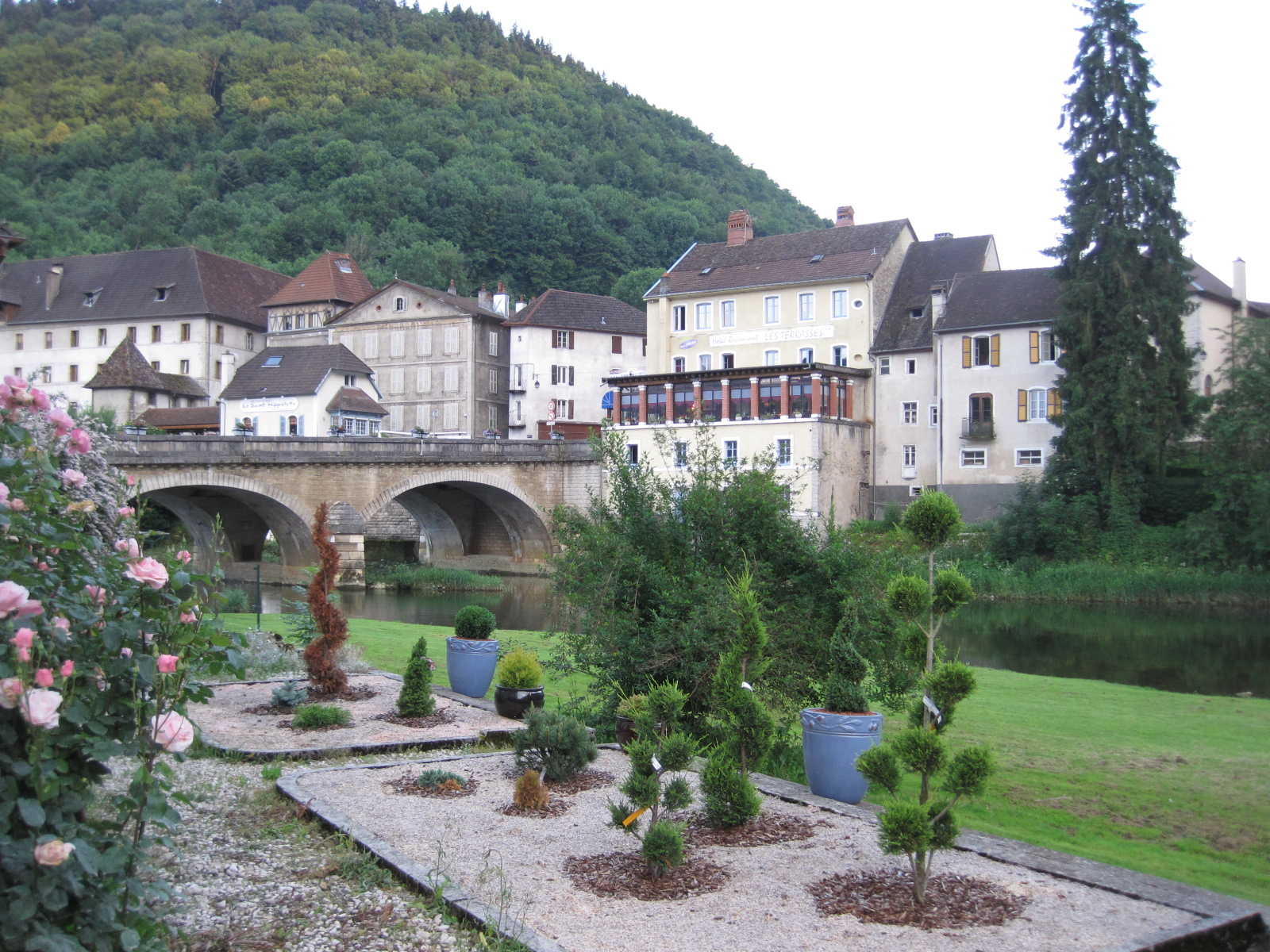

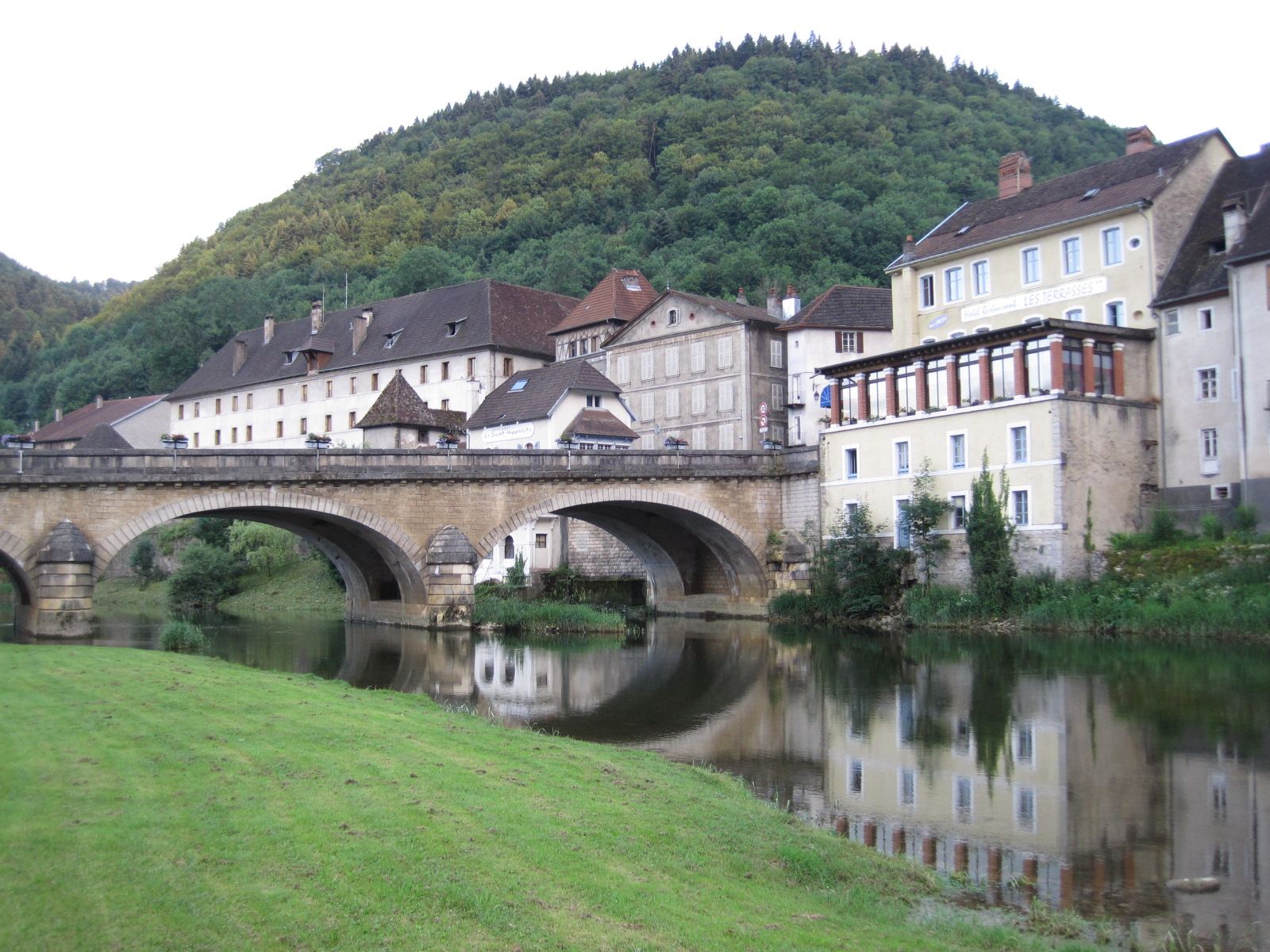

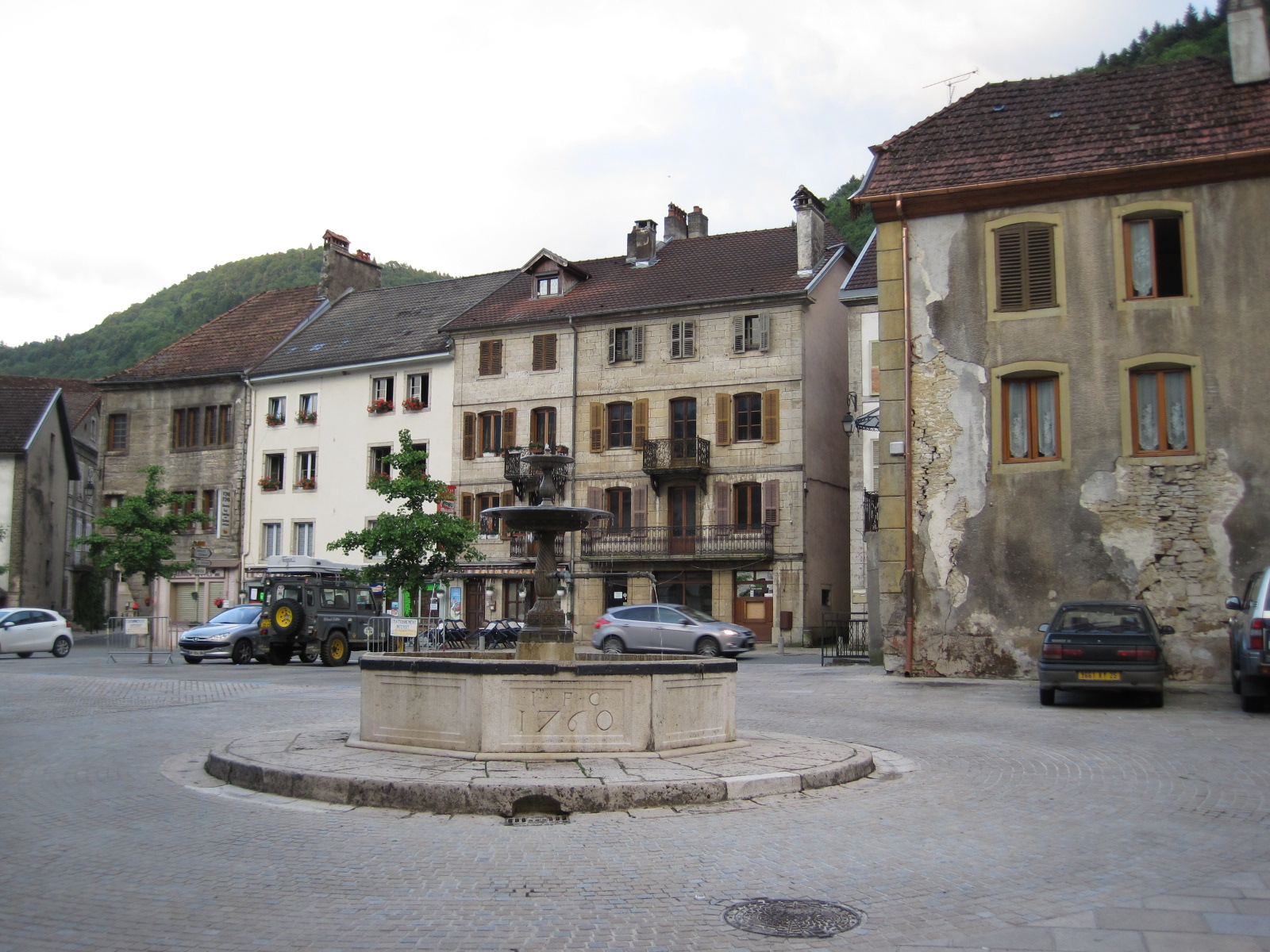

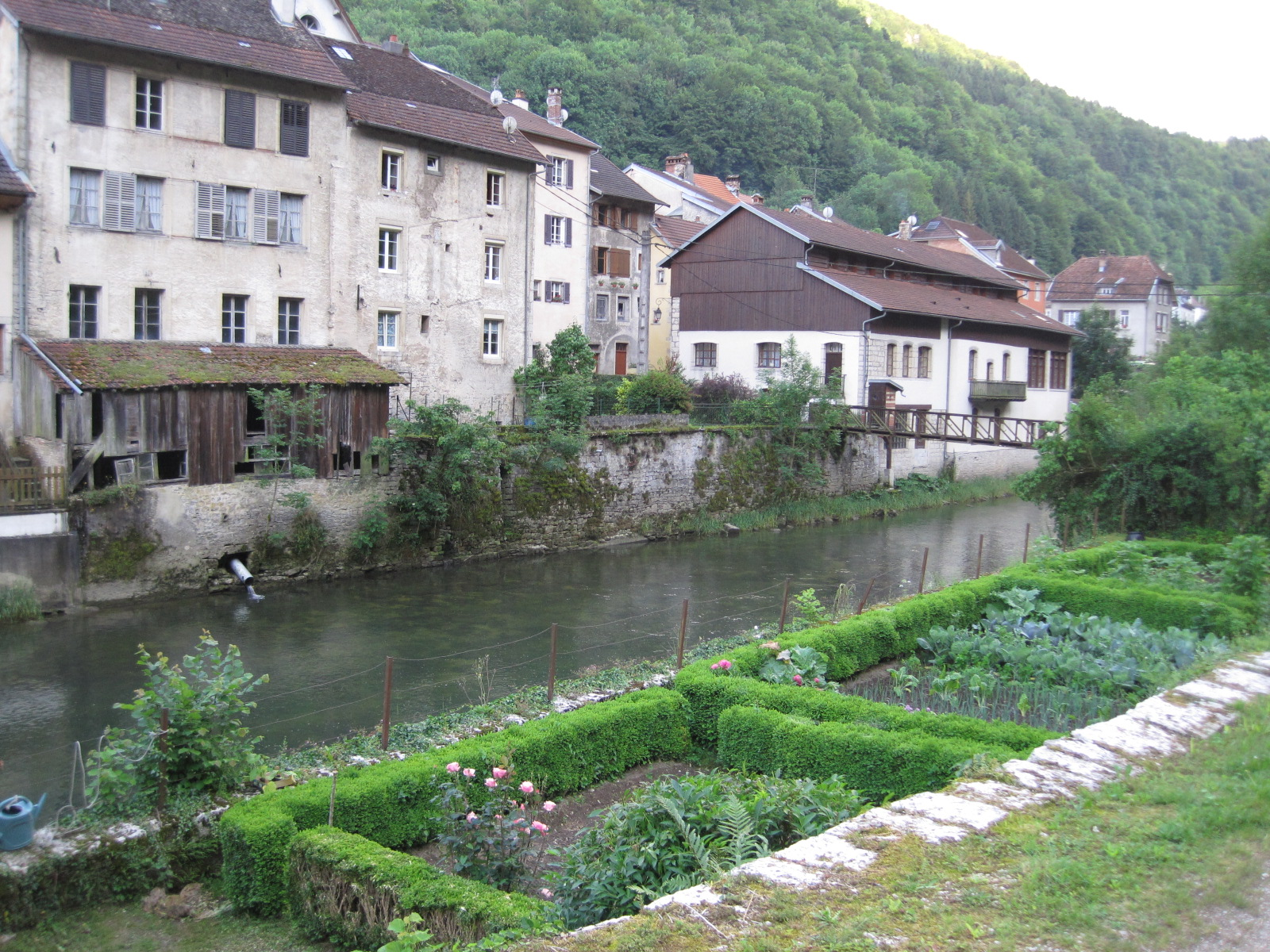

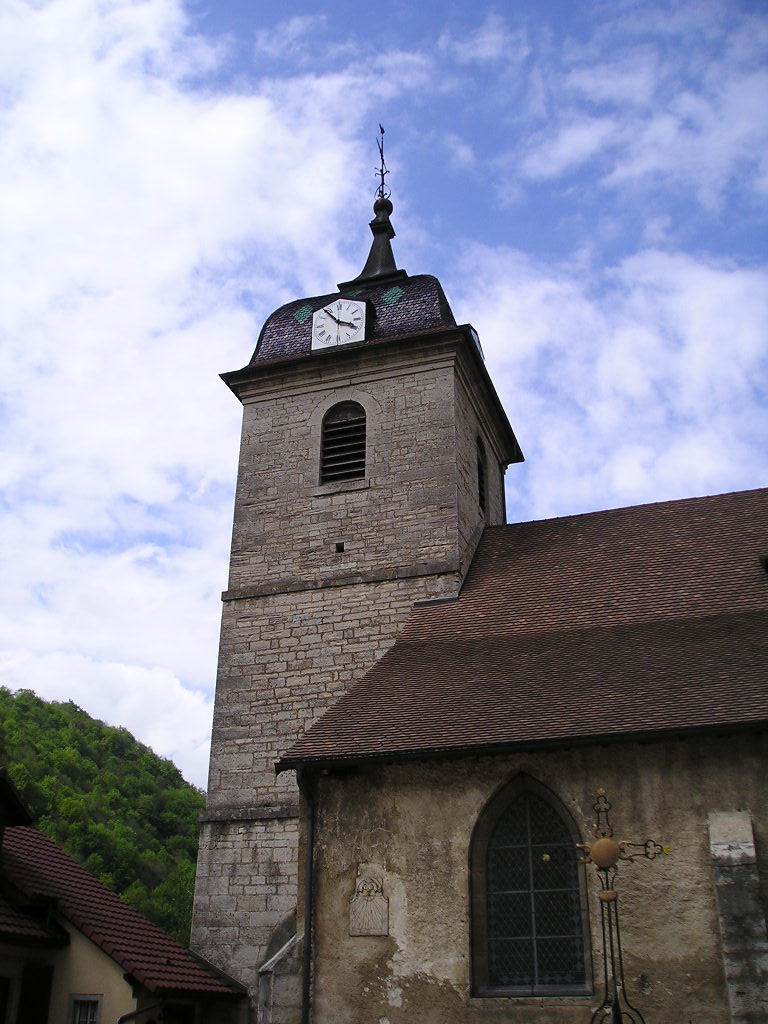

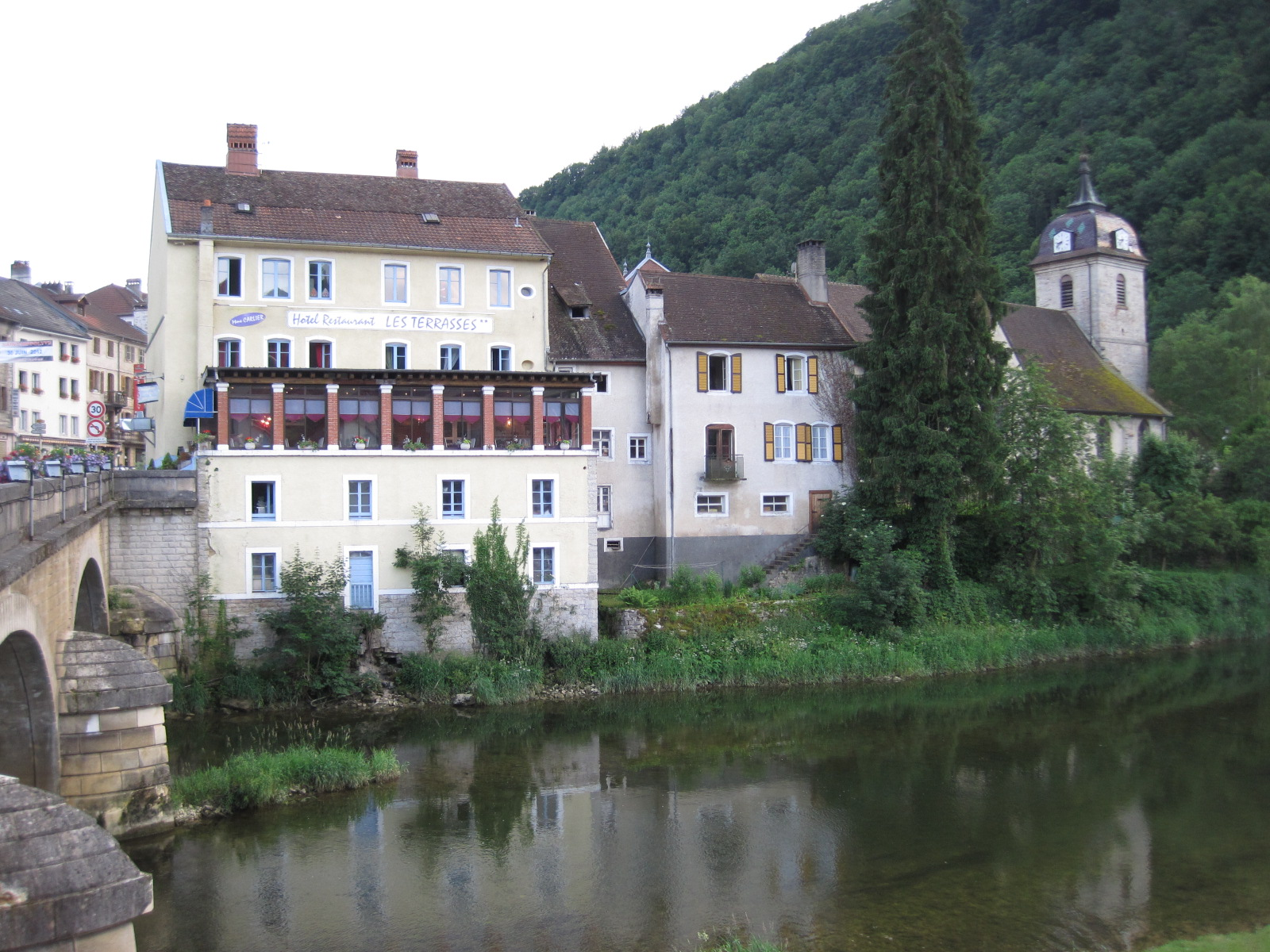

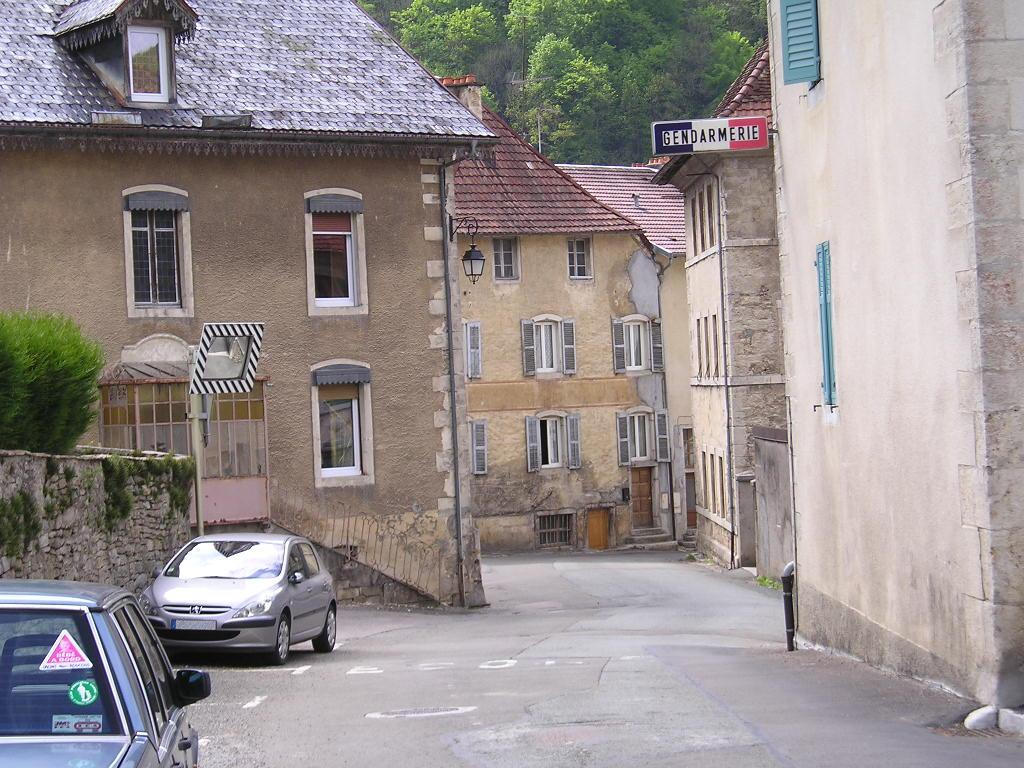

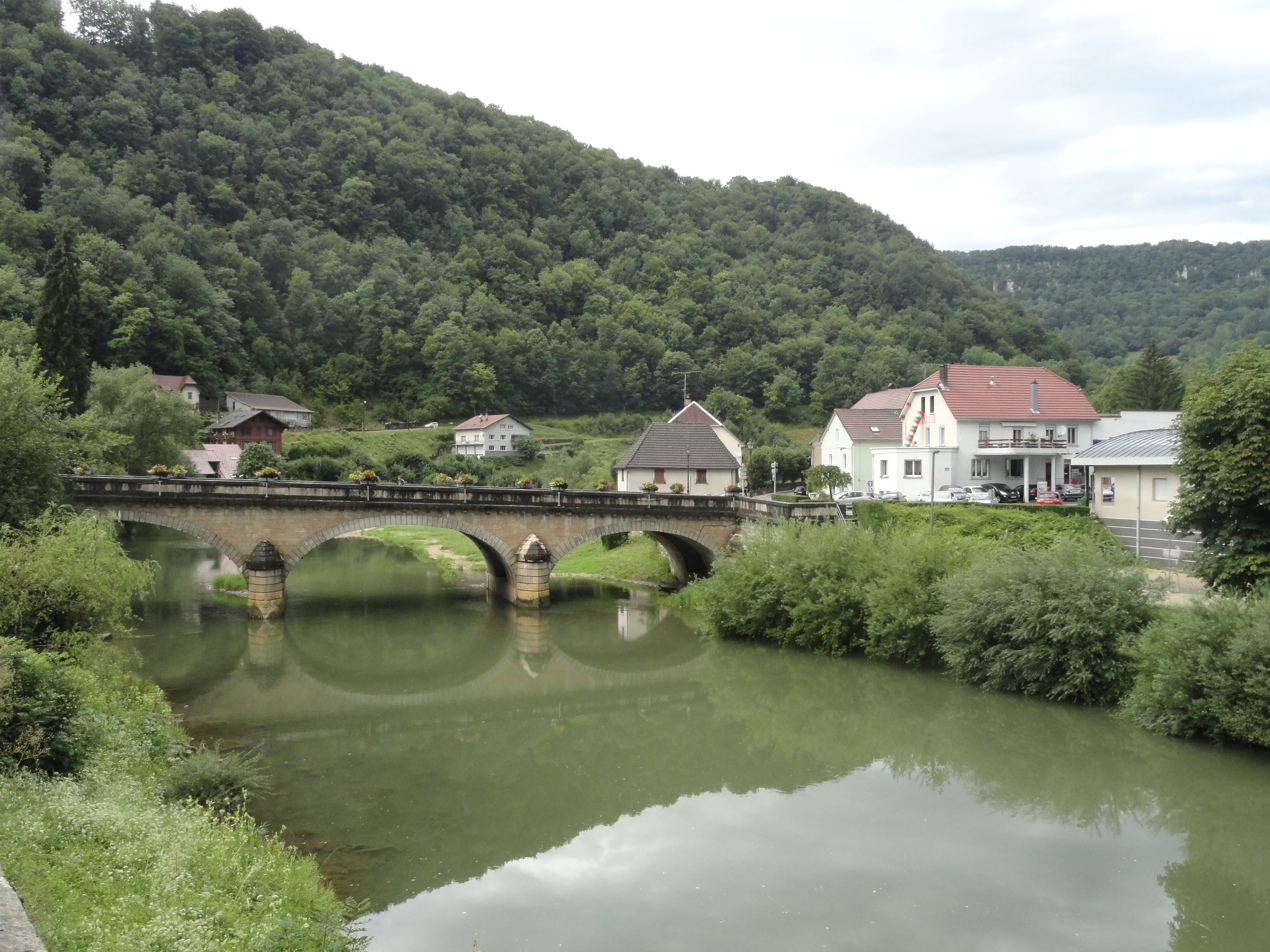

== See also ==
- Communes of the Doubs department
