= Guillaume Courtois =

Italian painter (1628–1679)

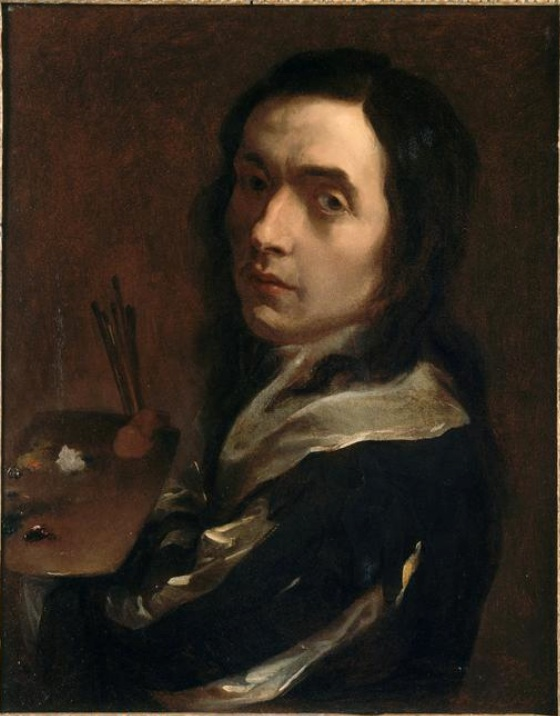
Presumed self-portrait

Guillaume Courtois (French pronunciation: [ɡijom kuʁtwa]) or italianized as Guglielmo Cortese, called Il Borgognone or Le Bourguignon ('the Burgundian'), (1628 – 14 or 15 June 1679) was a Free Burgundian-Italian painter, draughtsman and etcher. He was mainly active in Rome as a history and staffage painter and worked for high-level private patrons as well as large public commissions. He was a skilled portraitist, manifesting realistic sensitivity and a peculiar expressiveness. He left a large number of preparatory drawings which testify to his productivity.

== Life ==
Guillaume Courtois was born in Saint-Hippolyte (Free County of Burgundy), Holy Roman Empire, as the son of the obscure painter Jean-Pierre Courtois. His two brothers Jacques (Giacomo Cortese) and Jean-François also became painters. Very little is known about Guillaume's youth and training. It is assumed that he received his initial art classes from his father. The father and his sons went to Italy circa 1636 when Guillaume was still a child. They travelled to Milan, Bologna, Venice, Florence and Siena.

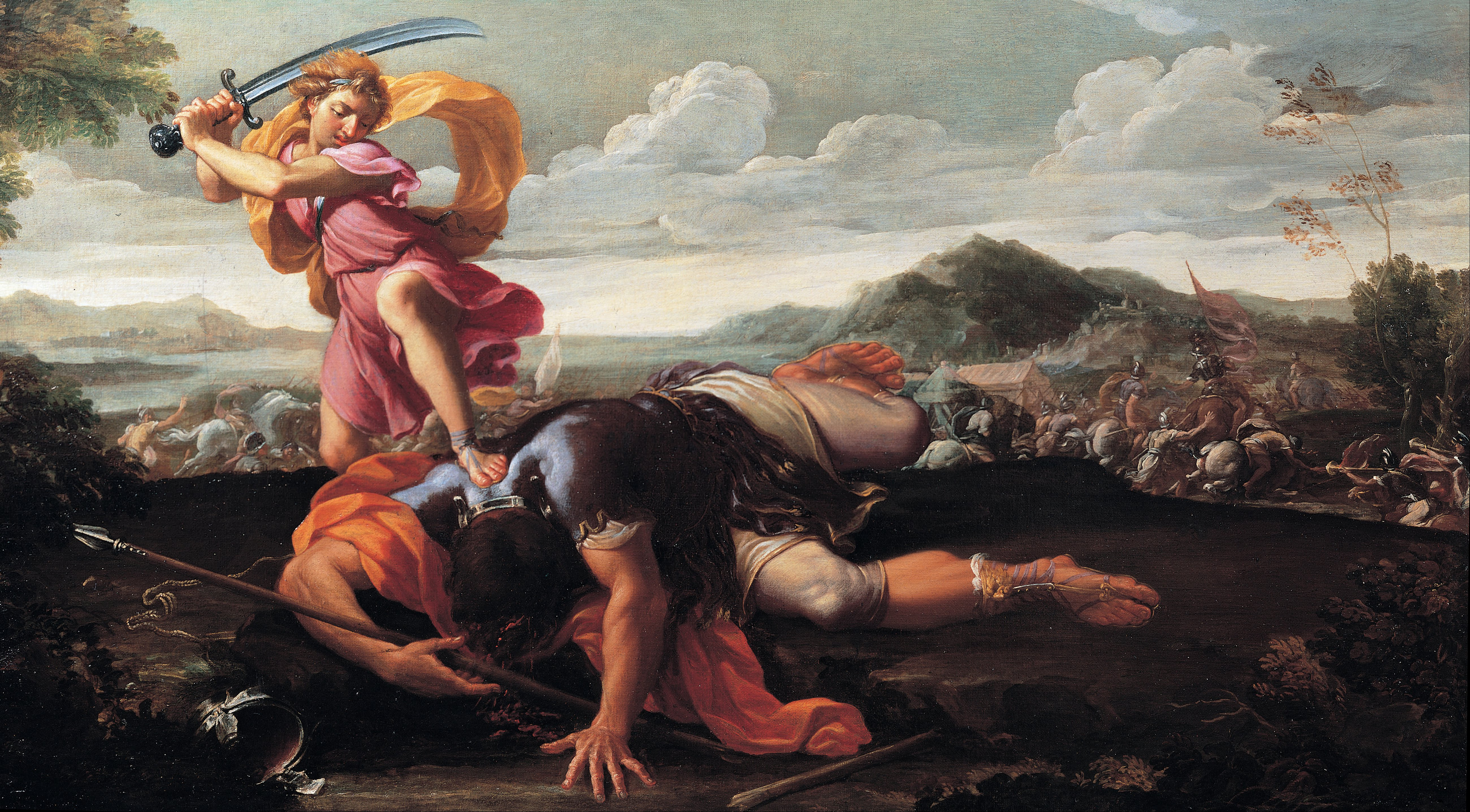
David and Goliath

The movements of the brothers Courtois are not very well documented, which has led to alternative theories. It is possible Gthat uillaume Courtois settled in Rome by 1638, where he entered the studio of Pietro da Cortona. Here, he is supposed to have supplemented his training by drawing from life and copying works of Giovanni Lanfranco and Andrea Sacchi. He also studied the Bolognese painters and Guercino, and formed for himself a classicizing style with very little express mannerism, partly resembling that of Carlo Maratta. Another view of the movements of the brothers that has gained support with modern scholars is that Guillaume and Jacques remained together until the later 1640s and that Guillaume Courtois only came under the influence of da Cortona when he worked under him in 1656.

Guillaume Courtois spent most of his active life in Rome, where he died of gout on 14 or 15 June 1679.

Jean-Blaise Chardon and Antonio Dupré were his pupils.

== Work ==
=== General ===
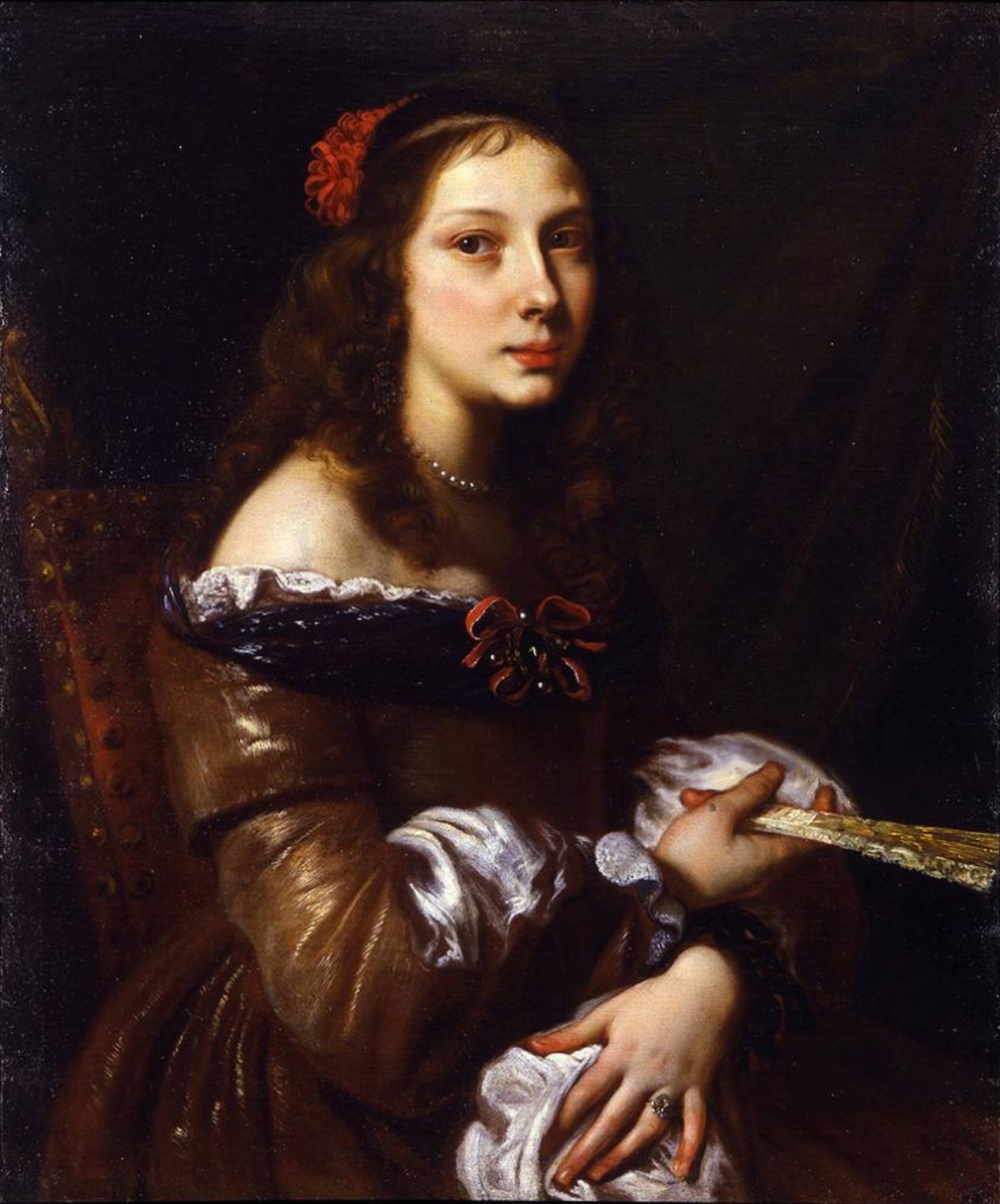
Portrait of a Young Bride with a Fan

Guillaume Courtois was mainly a history painter of Christian religious and mythological scenes. He was also in demand as a staffage painter. He is sometimes referred to as a battle painter because of his involvement in the decorative project in the chapel of the Congregation of the Jesuits, a small oratory housed in a room of the Collegio Romano adjacent to the Sant'Ignazio Church, Rome. This was a collaborative effort of the brothers Guillaume and Jacques. It is now established that Jacques - who was a specialist in battle scenes - painted the battles in the backgrounds. Guillaume painted the scenes that depict victories attributed to the intervention of the Virgin: Heraclius defeats the armies of Chosroes, St. Pulcheria, The Triumph of Emperor Zimisches, The Battle of Louis IX of France, and Julian the Apostate pierced by Saint Mercurius. Early drawings of Guillaume Courtois represent battle scenes and show that he was initially influenced by his brother. He also produced a few portraits, particularly in his early career. He depicts his sitters with realistic sensitivity and a peculiar expressiveness, combining the models of Gian Lorenzo Bernini and Carlo Maratta. He collaborated with other artists on genre paintings.

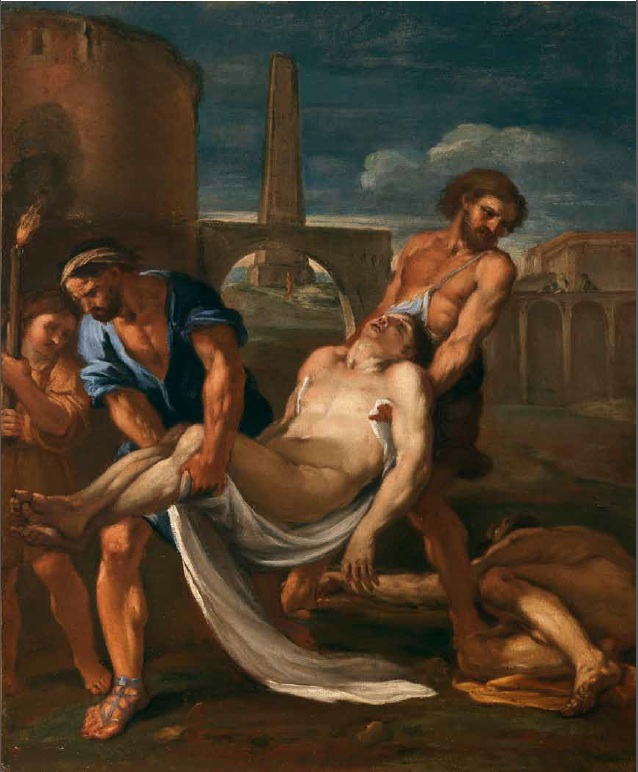
Saints Abdon and Sennen bury the remains of Christian martyrs

Courtois' first major public commissions were frescoes for the San Marco, Rome. Pietro da Cortona recommended the two brothers to Niccolò Sagredo, the Venetian ambassador in Rome who wished to have the church decorated. He painted the Battle of Joshua for the Gallery of Alexander VII in the Quirinal Palace and the Martyrdom of St Andrew for the high altar of the Sant'Andrea al Quirinale.

These early works show the influence of Cortona, combined with the influence of the Baroque style of Agostino Carracci through the mediation of the more dynamic version offered by Giovanni Lanfranco’s work. These influences are reflected in the exuberance in form and colour that will remain characteristic of Courtois’ work. The style of Pier Francesco Mola also formed a factor in his development. He also worked alongside Mola, Gaspard Dughet, Francesco Cozza, and Giovanni Battista Tassi on the decoration of the Valmontone Palace of Camillo Francesco Maria Pamphili around 1658-1659. Some figures painted by Courtois in this Palace were previously attributed to Mola.

In 1661, he painted an Assumption for the church of San Tommaso da Villanova in Castelgandolfo in Ozzola.

In his mature work, he further showed the influence of Carlo Maratta, an artist who fused the Baroque and Classicist styles. This is reflected in the sweet faces of the female figures in works such as the Madonna of the Rosary for the St. George Church in Monte Porzio Catone made in 1666 on a commission by prince Giovanni Battista Borghese.

=== Collaborations ===
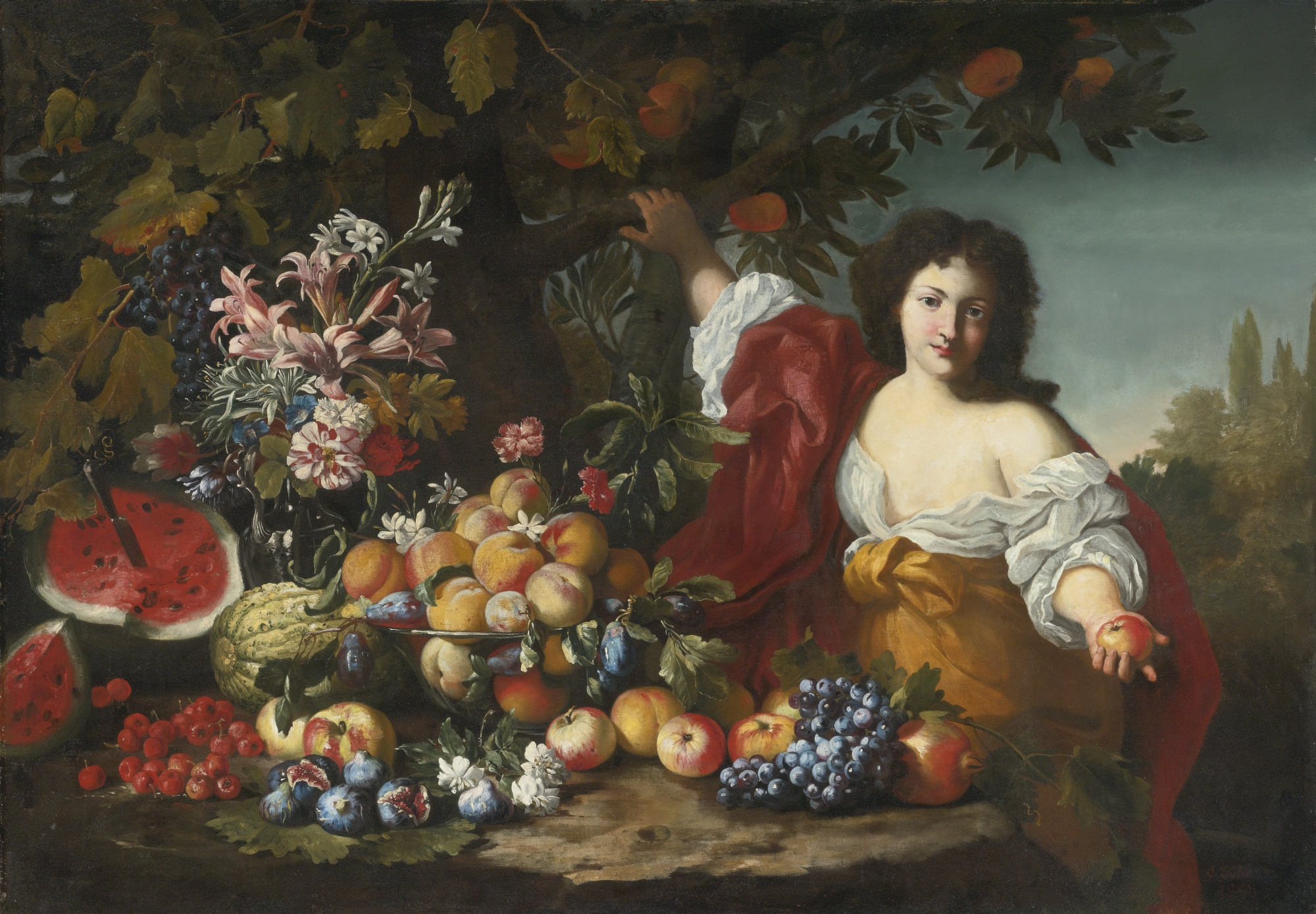
Still life of fruits and flowers with a figure

In addition to the frequent collaborations with his brother Jacques, a number of collaborations between Guillaume Courtois and Abraham Brueghel, a Flemish still life painter active in Rome, are recorded. An example is the Still life of fruits and flowers with a figure (Sold at Sotheby's on 29 January 2015 in New York, lot 302). The still life was painted by Brueghel, while Courtois painted the figure. The painting is a variant of the Grapes and pomegranate with a vase of flowers and a female figure (private collection), which has been dated to the end of the 1660s. Courtois reprised the charming female figure in his Fruit Picker (Gemäldegalerie, Dresden), which is a collaboration with Michele Pace del Campidoglio. He also collaborated frequently on public works with Bernini, who admired his work and recommended him for commissions, and Carlo Maratta.

In 1653, he painted the figures of St. Eustace, the Good Samaritan, a St. Mary of Egypt and St. Augustine in four large landscapes of Gaspard Dughet. This was one of the earliest documented commissions of Courtois and the patron was Camillo Francesco Maria Pamphili. The next year, Courtois and Dughet collaborated again for the same patron on works for the Palazzo Pamphilj.

=== Drawings ===
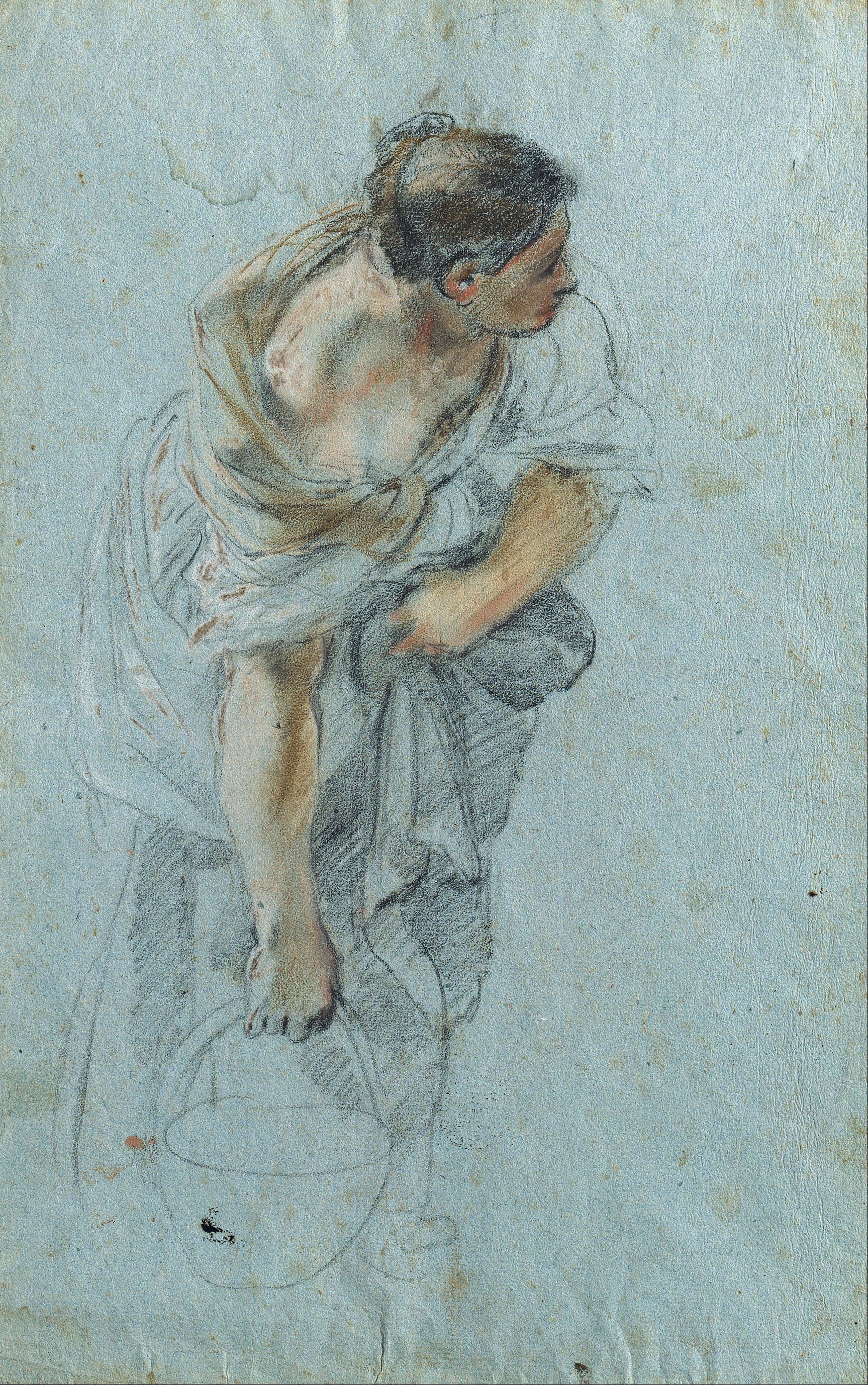
Study for a female figure

Guillaume Courtois was a very skilled draughtsman, as is testified by the many preparatory studies he left behind and which can be found, amongst others, in the Istituto Nazionale per la Grafica. Preparatory drawings are generally in chalk, whereas compositional designs tend to be in pen and ink and wash.

The preparatory studies in chalk (Nationalmuseum, Stockholm and the Museum Kunstpalast, Düsseldorf) for The Martyrdom of St Mark fresco in San Marco are very skilful and demonstrate a fluid technique and a firm grasp of form and chiaroscuro.
