= Francesco Cozza (painter) =

Italian painter (1605–1682)

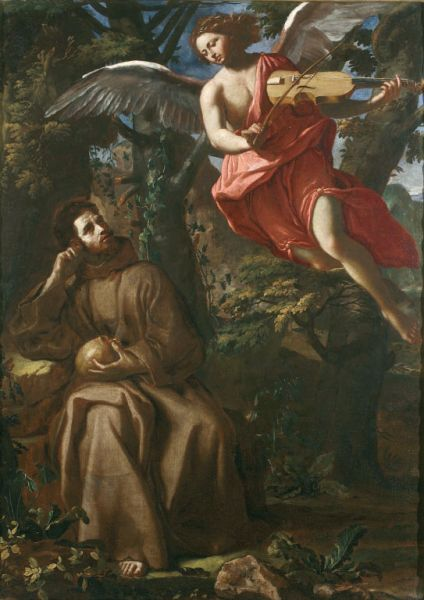
- Francesco Cozza, Saint Francis consoled by an Angel, Galleria Nazionale di Palazzo Arnone, Cosenza, Italy
- Born: 1605; Stilo, Calabria, Italy
- Died: 1682 (aged 76–77)
- Occupation: Artist

Francesco Cozza (1605 in Stignano (RC) – 13 January 1682 in Roma) was an Italian painter of the Baroque period.

== Life ==
Cozza was born in Stignano, in Calabria, and died in Rome. As a young man, he went to Rome where he was apprenticed to Domenichino, with whom he traveled to Naples in 1634.

He is best known for his expansive panegyric ceiling fresco, Apotheosis of Pamphili House (1667–1673) in the library of Palazzo Pamphili in Piazza Navona in Rome. During 1658 to 1659, he frescoed the Stanza del Fuoco in Palazzo Pamphili in Valmontone, working alongside Pier Francesco Mola, Gaspar Dughet, Mattia Preti, Giovanni Battista Tassi (il Cortonese), and Guglielmo Cortese. He also collaborated with Carlo Maratta and Domenico Maria Canuti in the fresco decorations of the Palazzo Altieri. His landscape paintings recall the Carracci style of paesi con figure piccole (landscapes with small figures). He painted a Madonna del Riscatto in church of Santa Francesca Romana. He was received into the Accademia di San Luca at Rome in 1650.

He etched several plates in the style of Pietro del Po, including a St. Peter (1630); a Christ sleeping and adored by Angels and a St Mary Magdalene (1650).

== Gallery ==
Francesco Cozza's paintings

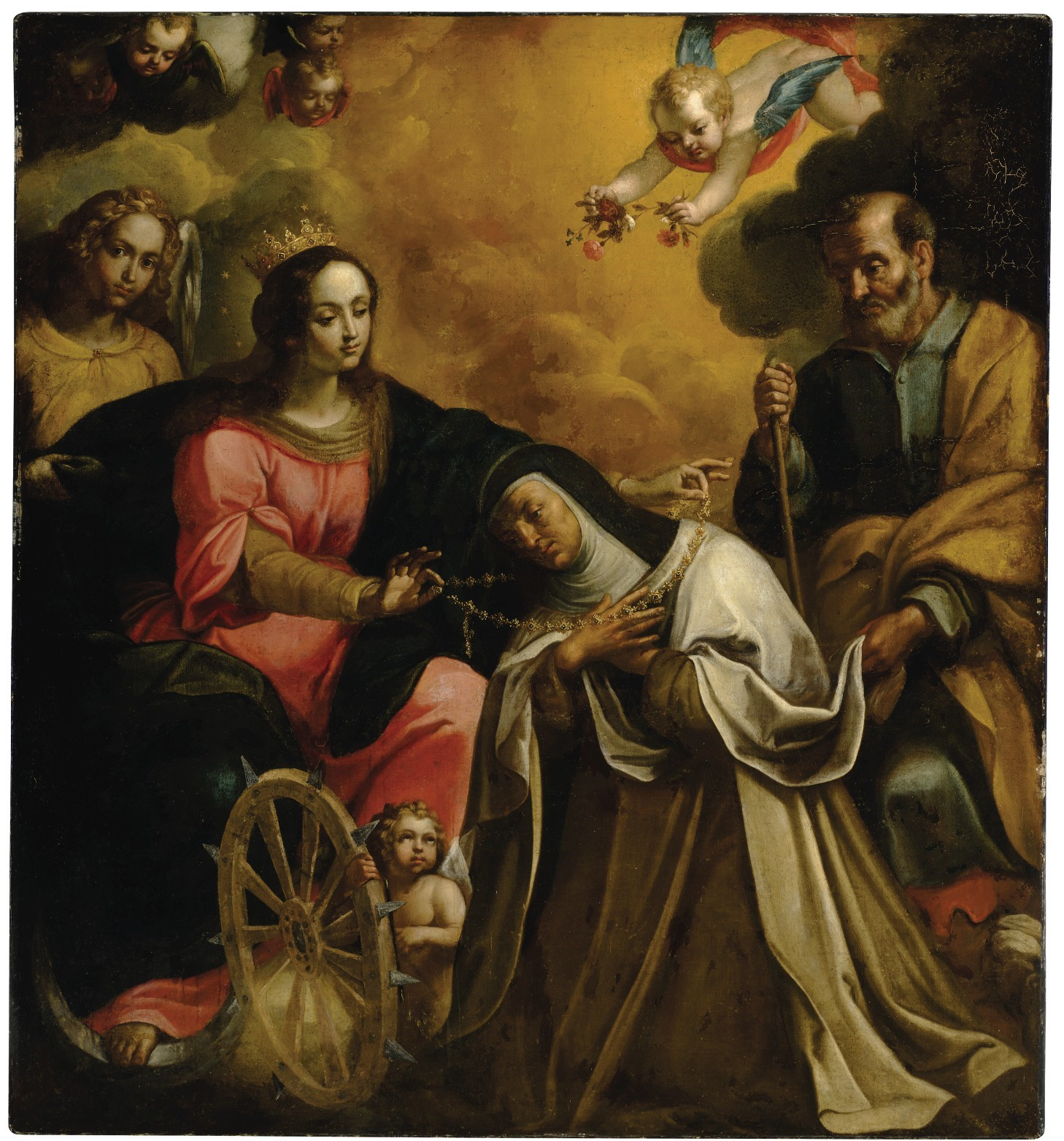
The vision of Saint Teresa of Avila

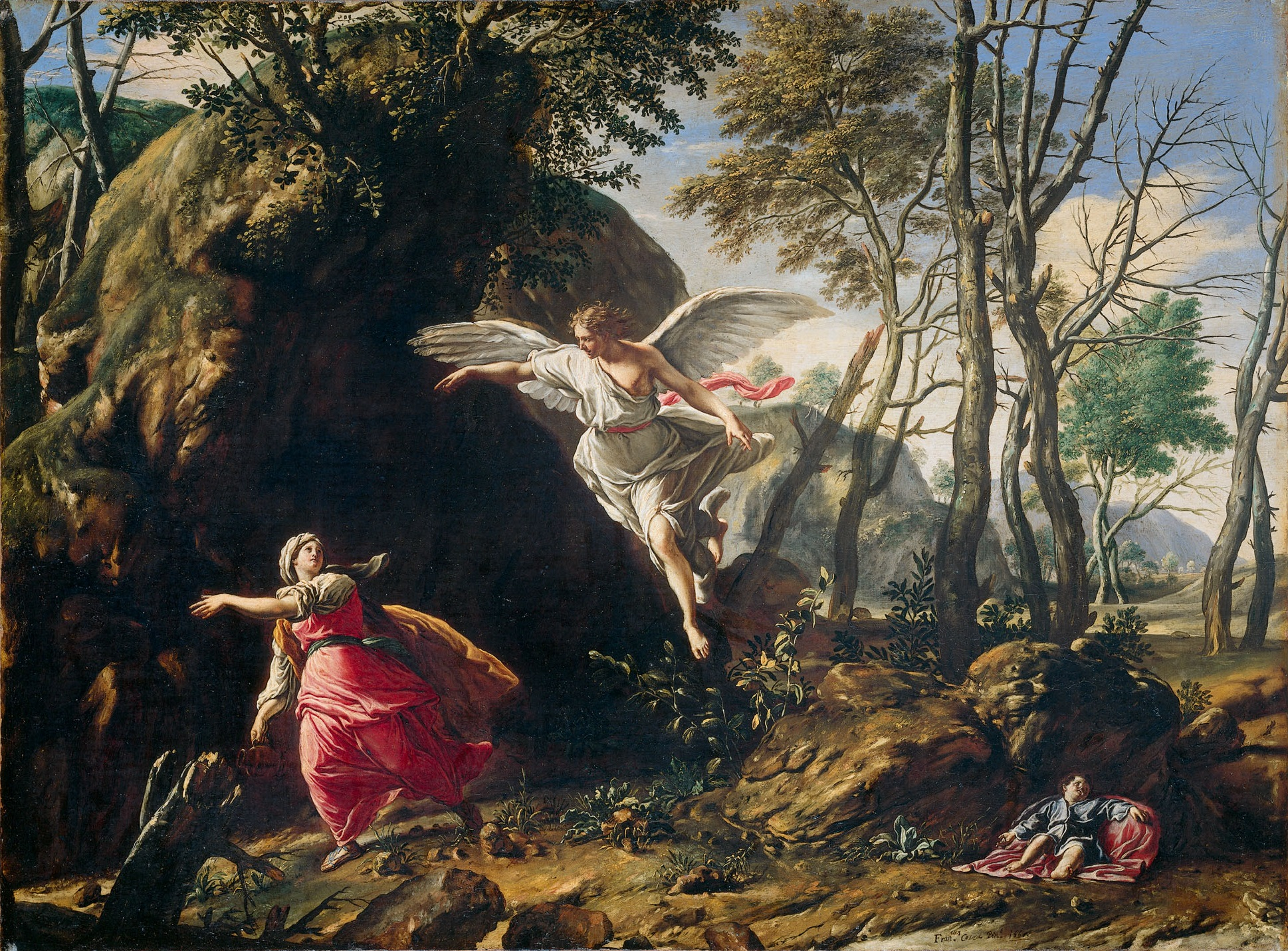
Hagar in the Wilderness

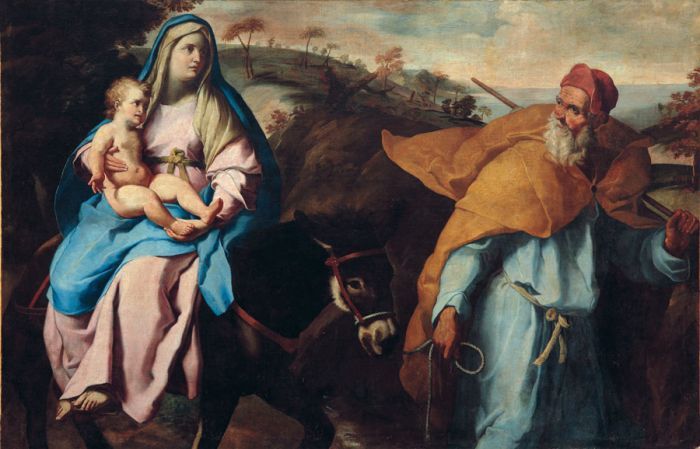
Fuga in Egitto, Convent of Sant'Angelo in Pescheria, Rome

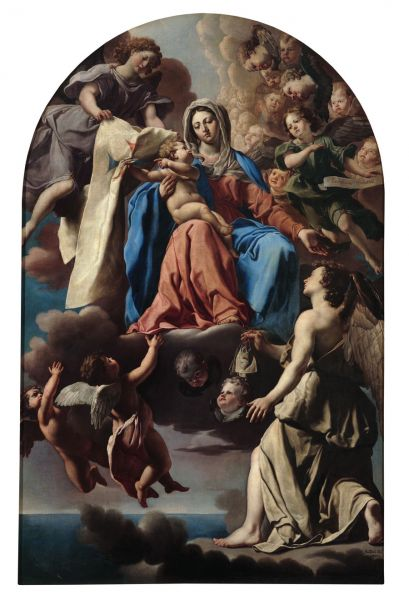

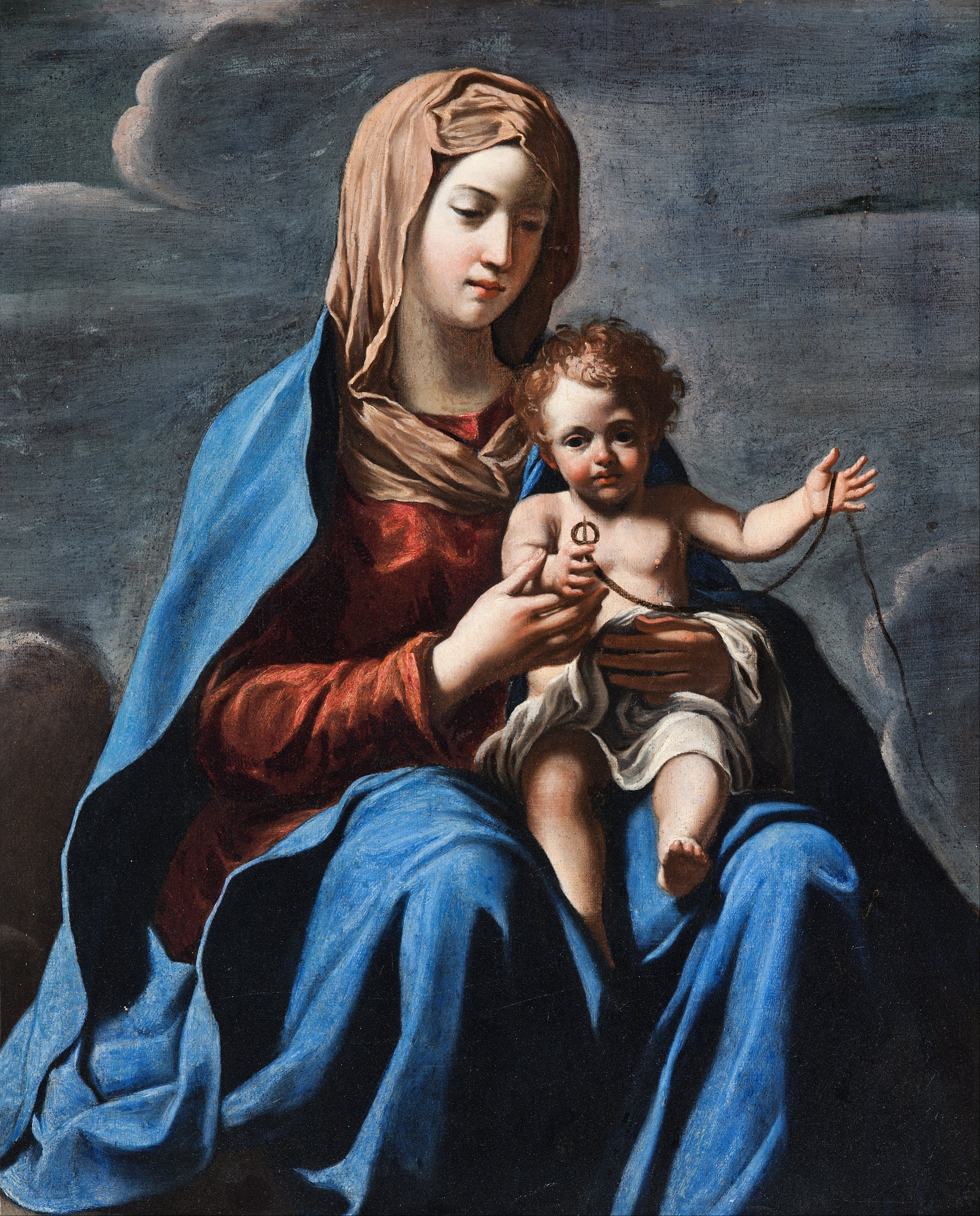
Madonna and Child

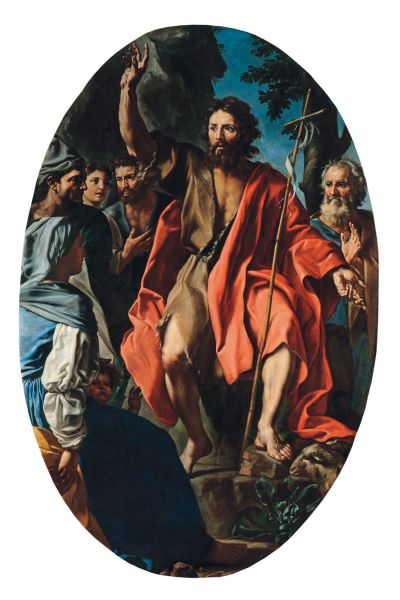
La predica del Battista, Galleria Nazionale di Arte antica, Palazzo Barberini, Rome

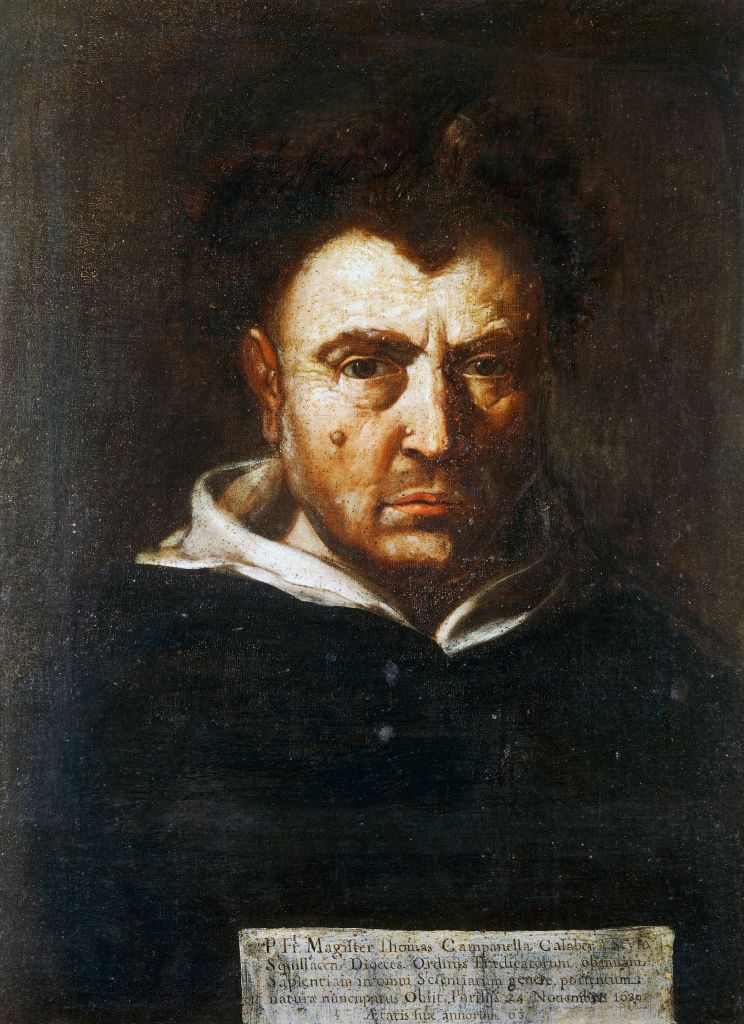
Portrait of Tommaso Campanella, Collezione Camillo Caetani, Sermoneta

== Sources ==
- Bryan, Michael (1886). Robert Edmund Graves (ed.). Dictionary of Painters and Engravers, Biographical and Critical. Vol. I: A-K. London: George Bell and Sons. p. 325.
