= Gaspard Dughet =

French painter (1615–1675)

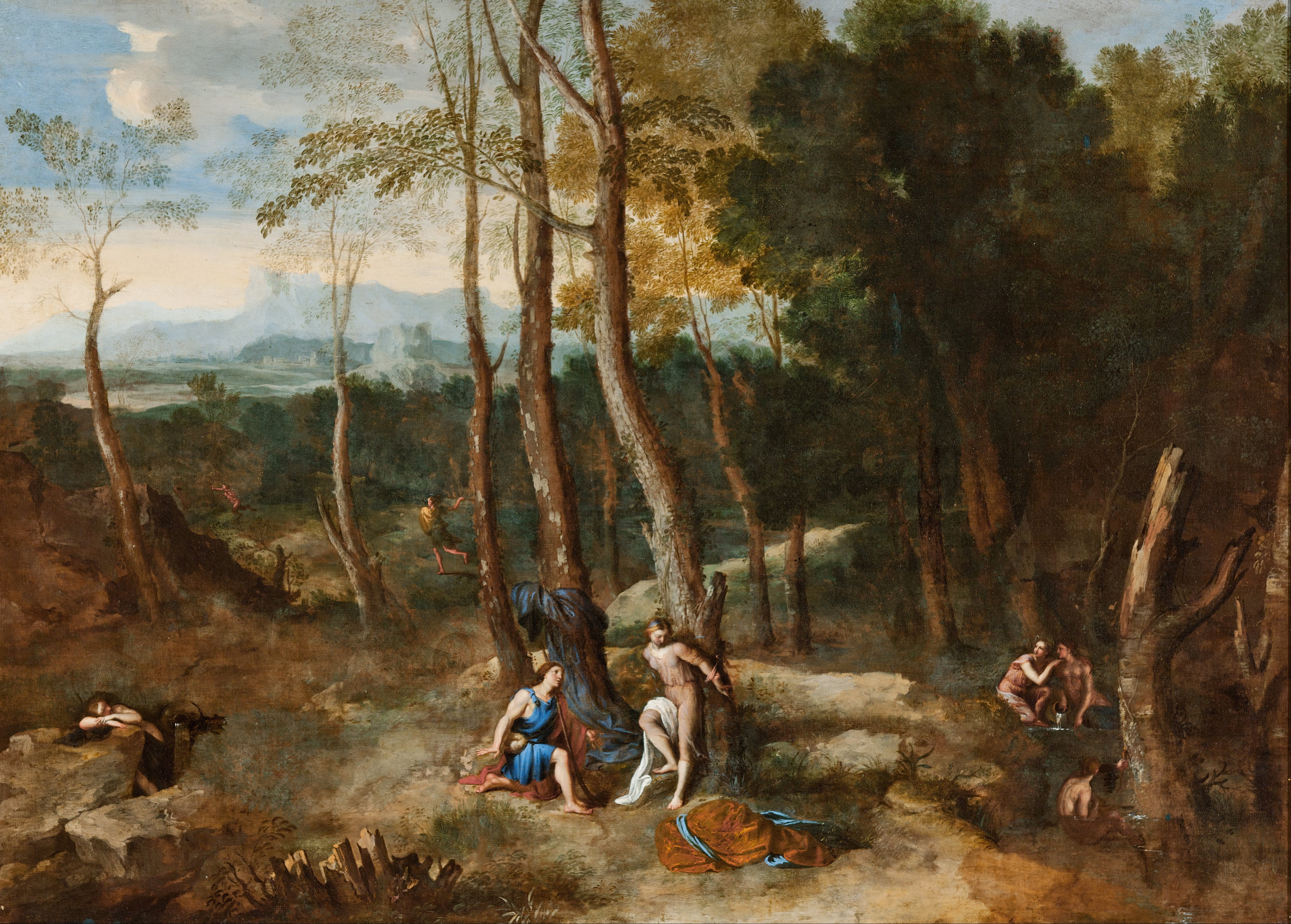
Aminta About to Rescue Silvia, c. 1633–35

Gaspard Dughet (15 June 1615 – 25 May 1675), also known as Gaspard Poussin, was a French painter born in Rome.

== Life ==
Dughet was born in Rome, the son of a French pastry-cook and his Italian wife. He has always generally been considered as a French painter, although in fact he never visited France. Between around 1631 and 1635 he became a pupil of Nicolas Poussin, who had married his sister Anne five years earlier. Because of this connection he was widely known as "Gaspard Poussin." After leaving Poussin's studio his works developed a more fluid style and developed his pictures of storms which account for 30 out of his 400 known works.

He specialised in painting landscapes of the Roman Campagna becoming, along with his exact contemporary Salvator Rosa, one of the two leading landscape painters of his time. He painted several cycles of frescoes, including one, showing various sites around Rome, at the Palazzo Colonna. He worked with Pier Francesco Mola, Cozza, and Mattia Preti at the Palazzo Pamphilj in Valmontone. He often collaborated with Guillaume Courtois who painted the staffage in his landscapes. This was the case, for instance, in the works for the Palazzo Pamphilj. There is another fresco cycle by Dughet, though in a bad state of preservation, in San Martino ai Monti.

Dughet died in Rome on 25 May 1675.

== Influence ==
During the 18th century Dughet's work became especially popular amongst British collectors, to such an extent that his name became attached to almost any classical landscape, and his style proved influential on British landscape painting and garden design. His Sacrifice of Abraham, once the property of the Colonna family, is now, with other of his works, in the National Gallery, London. Thomas Gainsborough and John Constable were inspired by Dughet and recommended him as a model.

His pupils included Crescenzio Onofri (1634–1712/14), Jacques de Rooster (fl. late 17th century) and Jan Frans van Bloemen (1662–1749).
