= Saint Christopher =

Christian saint

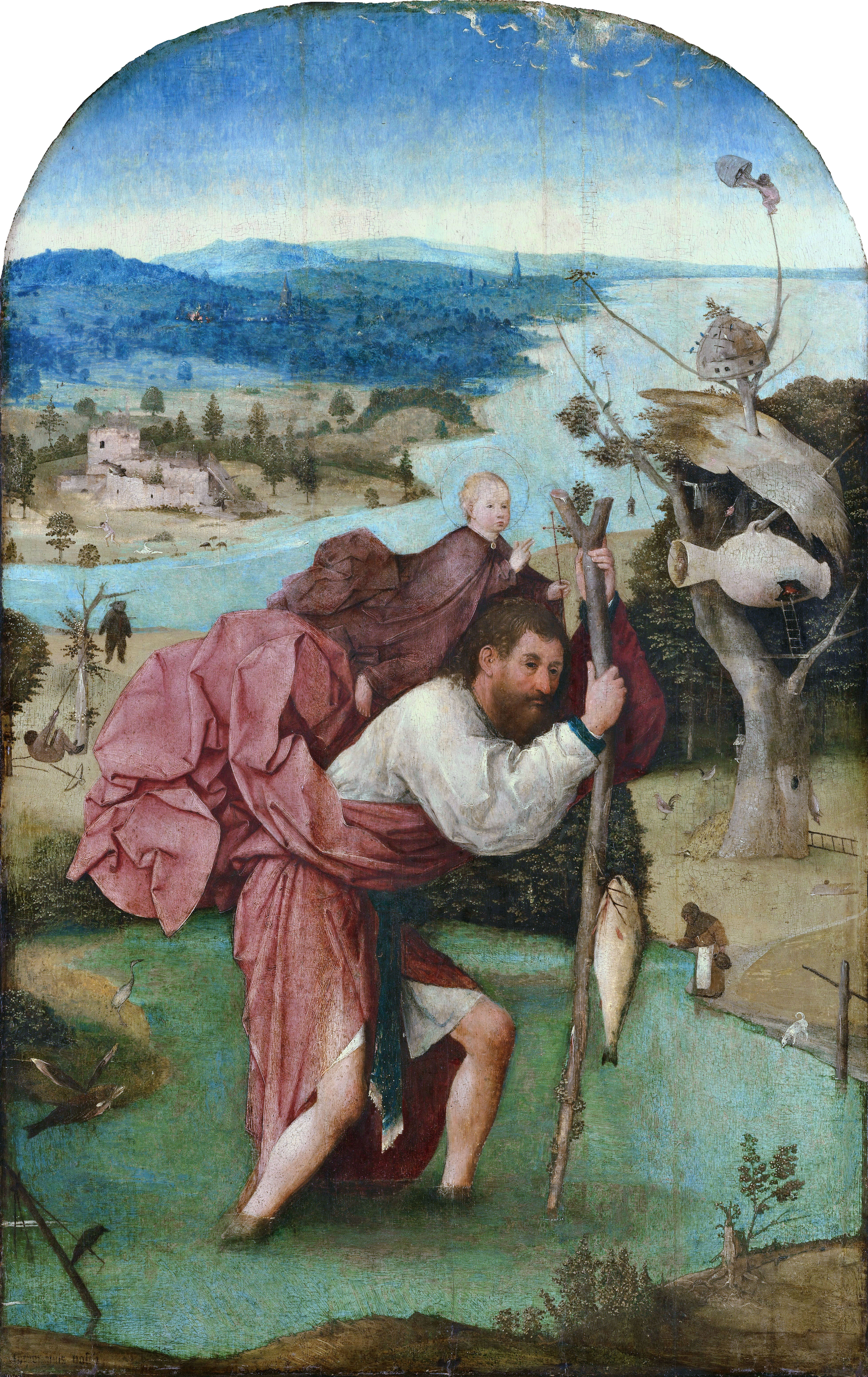
- St. Christopher Carrying the Christ Child, by Hieronymus Bosch (1485)

Martyr
- Born: The legendary accounts situate the saint's life somewhere in the middle 3rd century to the early 4th century and his birth place in Marmarica, Asia Minor or Barbaria.
- Died: Legendary accounts may situate the place of death in Lycia, Perga or Antioch.
- Venerated in: Eastern Orthodoxy; Roman Catholicism; Lutheranism; Oriental Orthodoxy; Anglicanism
- Canonized: Pre-Congregation
- Feast: 24 July (German-speaking dioceses); 25 July (General Roman Calendar); 9 May (Eastern Churches); 2 Parmouti (Coptic Church)
- Attributes: tree, branch, as a giant or ogre, carrying the infant Jesus, Spear, shield, as a dog-headed man
- Patronage: athletics, bachelors, transportation (drivers, sailors, etc.), traveling (especially for long journeys), surfing, storms, Brunswick, Saint Christopher's Island (Saint Kitts), Island of Rab, Vilnius, Havana, epilepsy, gardeners, toothache

Saint Christopher (Greek: Ἅγιος Χριστόφορος, romanized: Hágios Christóphoros, lit. 'Christ-bearer'; Latin: Sanctus Christophorus), also called Christopher of Lycia (Lycea), is a legendary figure venerated by several Christian denominations as a martyr and saint. The various legends regarding the saint do not agree on the time and place of his activity. His legendary birthplace is variously placed in Marmarica (west of Egypt), Asia Minor, or Barbaria. The legendary accounts may situate the saint's legendary martyrdom during the reign of the 3rd-century Roman emperors Decius (r. 249–251), Diocletian (r. 284–305) or Maximinus Daza (r. 308–313). A martyrium of a Saint Christopher consecrated near Chalcedon (near present-day Istanbul) in 452 is the earliest evidence of a cult of a Saint Christopher. The saint's veneration spread in both the Eastern and Western churches.

Broadly, two hagiographic traditions developed mainly distinguished by the level in which they emphasize or downplay the wild animal, monster-like nature of the saint: the older Eastern tradition describes the pre-conversion Christopher as having a ferocious nature and animal features (in particular, the head of a dog) while the younger Western tradition does not dwell as much on these animal-like mental and physical features but rather emphasizes the lack of culture, the giant size and the ugliness of the saint.

Both traditions hold that Christopher was not the initial name of the saint but that this name was only adopted by, or given to, the saint following his conversion to Christianity. The name Christopher used in the English-speaking world is the English version of the Greek name Χριστόφορος (Christóphoros or Christóforos). It is formed from the word elements Χριστός (Christós, 'Christ'), and φέρειν (phérein, 'to bear'); the name therefore means, "bearer of Christ." As the saint's legend spread to many regions, native forms of the Greek name developed both to refer to the saint and as a personal name.

It has been speculated that the medieval artistic representations showing Saint Christopher physically carrying the infant Jesus led to the development of the best-known legend about the saint today. This legend makes its debut only in the 13th-century compendium of hagiographies known as the Legenda aurea (Golden Legend). The Golden Legend recounts that after converting to Christianity, St. Christopher devoted his life to carrying travelers across a river. One day, he was asked to carry a young boy across a river. During the crossing, the boy became increasingly heavy, to the point that even the able-bodied Christopher struggled to continue to cross the river, even more so since the water level of the river was rising. After reaching the bank of the river, the boy reveals himself to be Jesus.

As some legendary stories recount that the saint devoted himself to helping travelers, various Christian denominations made him the patron saint of travelers. Small images of him are often worn around the neck, on a bracelet, carried in a pocket or placed in a vehicle in the belief they offer protection from adversity when traveling. In the iconography of Western Christianity, the saint is often depicted as a giant with a staff crossing a river with the infant Jesus on his shoulder. In Byzantine art, the saint is depicted in various guises including as a young man, a martyr in a red himation with a cross in his hand, a warrior on horseback or a man with the head of a dog in line with the early legendary tradition. Some modern scholarship has investigated the contempary understanding and the role and purpose in the legendary accounts of the 'otherness' and dual nature of the saint who is described as a giant with frightening features (in some accounts with a dog's head) but is at the same time human.

== Legend ==
=== Earliest evidence of a cult of St. Christopher ===
There is no evidence for the historicity of the saint. The cult of Saint Christopher was probably established in Asia Minor in the 5th century. A stone inscription was found in the ruins of a church close to Chalcedon, an ancient city near present-day Istanbul. The inscription states that a martyrium dedicated to a blessed Christopher was constructed from May 450 to 22 September 452, the date of its consecration. It also mentions the names of the state ministers of the Byzantine Empire and those church ministers who were involved in the church's construction and the consecration but provides no information on the person to whom the martyrium was dedicated other than the honorific and name blessed Christopher. The inscription attests to the veneration of a Saint Christopher in Asia Minor in the mid-5th century.

=== Sources of the earliest legendary accounts ===
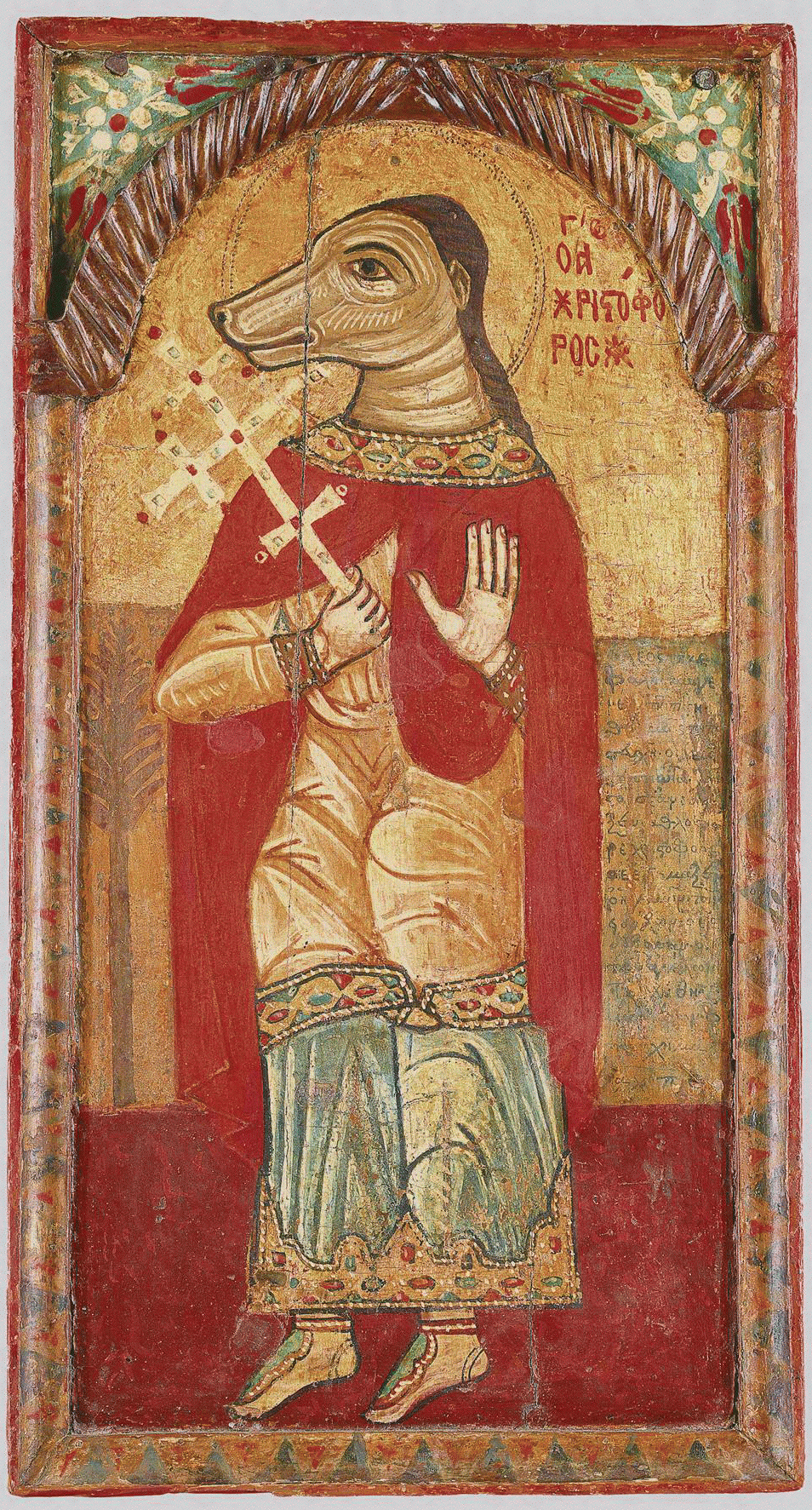
Greek icon representing St. Christopher with the head of a dog

The Christopher legend seems to have its roots in the Coptic Acts of Bartholomew, a partially preserved document going back to 4th- or 5th-century Egypt which has been partially reconstructed from later translations and elaborations such as the Acts of Andrew and Bartholomew. The Acts recount the miraculous missionary activities of Saint Bartholomew who is accompanied by Saint Andrew and two other disciples (referred to together as the apostles). According to the Acts, the apostles are sent by Jesus to convert the Parthians. In Parthia they meet Gallinos, the governor. To prove the power of their God, the apostles perform miracles showing that their God has absolute power over the city's idols. In response, the devils dwelling in the city idols demand that the apostles be burned with fire. The apostles are held and tortured in many imaginative ways. They die, their bodies are cut up and burnt. The ashes are thrown in the sea where they are swallowed by a whale. Nevertheless, the apostles are resurrected. Gallinos then offers the apostles money to leave the city. When they refuse, the city's people drive them out. The apostles then travel in the direction of the city of the cannibals. A dog-headed individual of four cubits tall (i.e. between 178 centimetres (70 in) and 209 centimetres (82 in) depending on which cubit standard is used) leaves the city of the cannibals to look for a human to eat but does not find food all day. An angel appears to him who baptizes him. As a result he loses his animal nature and acquires the ability to speak as a human. He is tasked by the angel to assist Saints Bartholomew and Andrew in converting the city of the cannibals. When he meets the saints and their two disciples they are initially afraid of him but he assuages their fears by telling them that their God has sent him to assist them in their mission. He tells them his name is 'Bewitched' (or the 'Damned', in the Arabic and Ethiopian versions he tells them his name is 'Bewitched' or 'Abominable'). The apostles say that from now on he will be called Christian (Christianus or Christomaios). They all set course to Parthia. Warned by satan, Gallinos closes the city gates when he hears of their approach. After Andrew has called on the Christian God to break down the gates, they enter the city. While under attack by the citizens and wild animals, Christomaios pleads with Andrew to obtain divine intervention so that he can reclaim his animal nature. Once he has become animal-like again he tears apart and eats the animals while many of the citizens die in the chaos. Andrew calms Christomaios and calls on their God to send a fire to encircle the city. The governor and the leaders of the city plead for deliverance and make a declaration of faith in Jesus. The fire is extinguished and the apostles subsequently succeed in converting the city's people. At Christomaios's request, the dead people are resurrected.

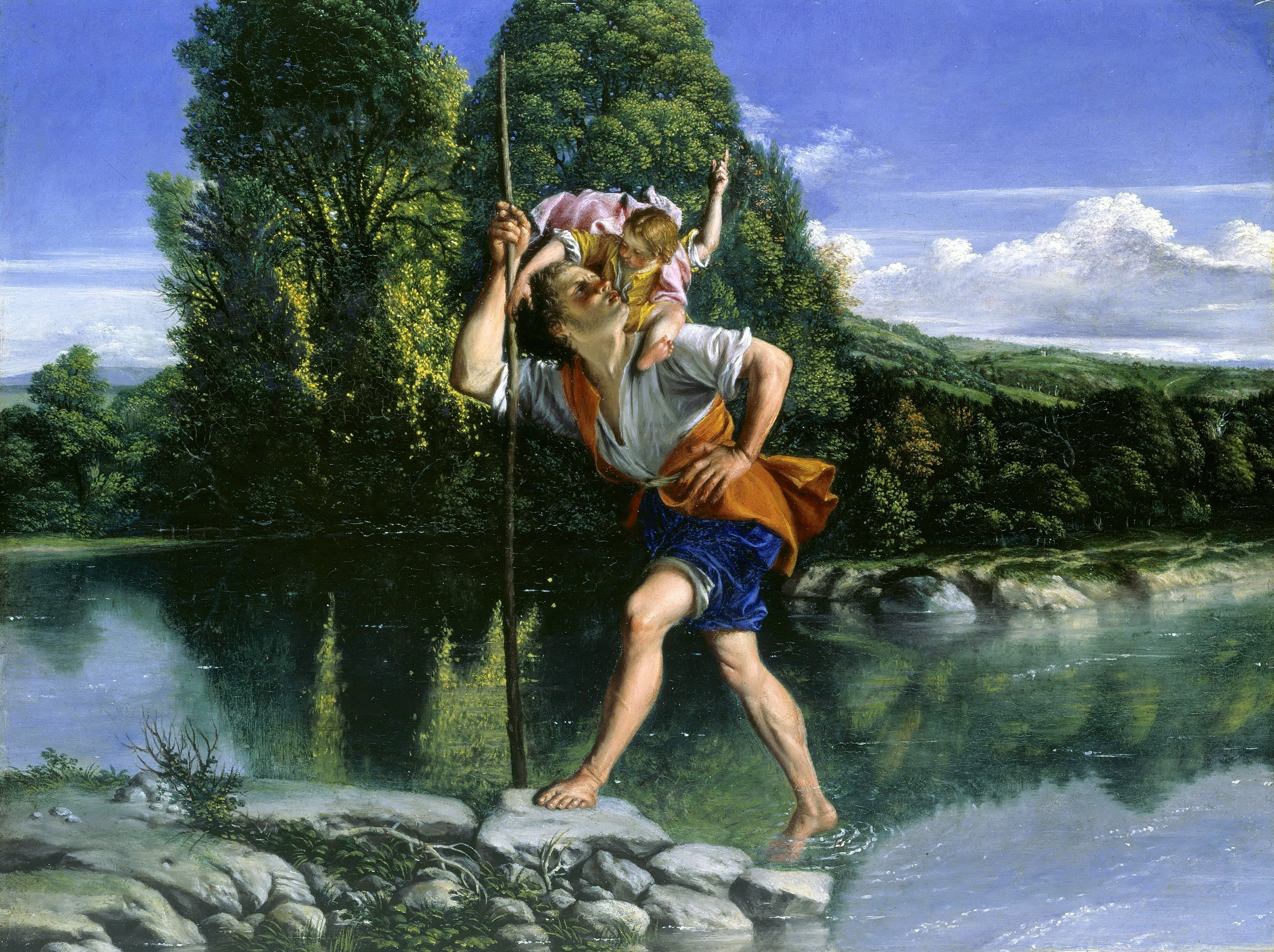
Landscape with St. Christopher by Orazio Gentileschi

The Acts of Bartholomew contain many of the themes that recur in the early Christopher legends, in particular that of the indestructibility of saints (in this case the apostles) who are able to survive almost all kinds of extreme torture or resurrect after having been murdered until they finally decide to give up their life in the ultimate martyrdom. Another story line also found in the Christopher legends is that of the pagan opponent first attempting to cajole the Christian converts to return to the pagan religion through kindness but when confronted with the intransigence of the saints or converts, then resorting to various forms of extreme torture. The direct intervention in the story of angels and devils, the mocking of pagan idols and the performance of miracles are also a staple of the Christopher legends.

=== The legendary accounts ===
Legends about the life and death of St, Christopher first appeared in Greece in the 5th or 6th century and spread very early throughout Egypt, Syria and Palestine before spreading to the West by the 9th century. The oldest preserved written versions were penned in Greek (one of which is known as BHG 309-310c, possibly 5th century or later) and Latin (one of which is known as BHL 1764, 8th century).

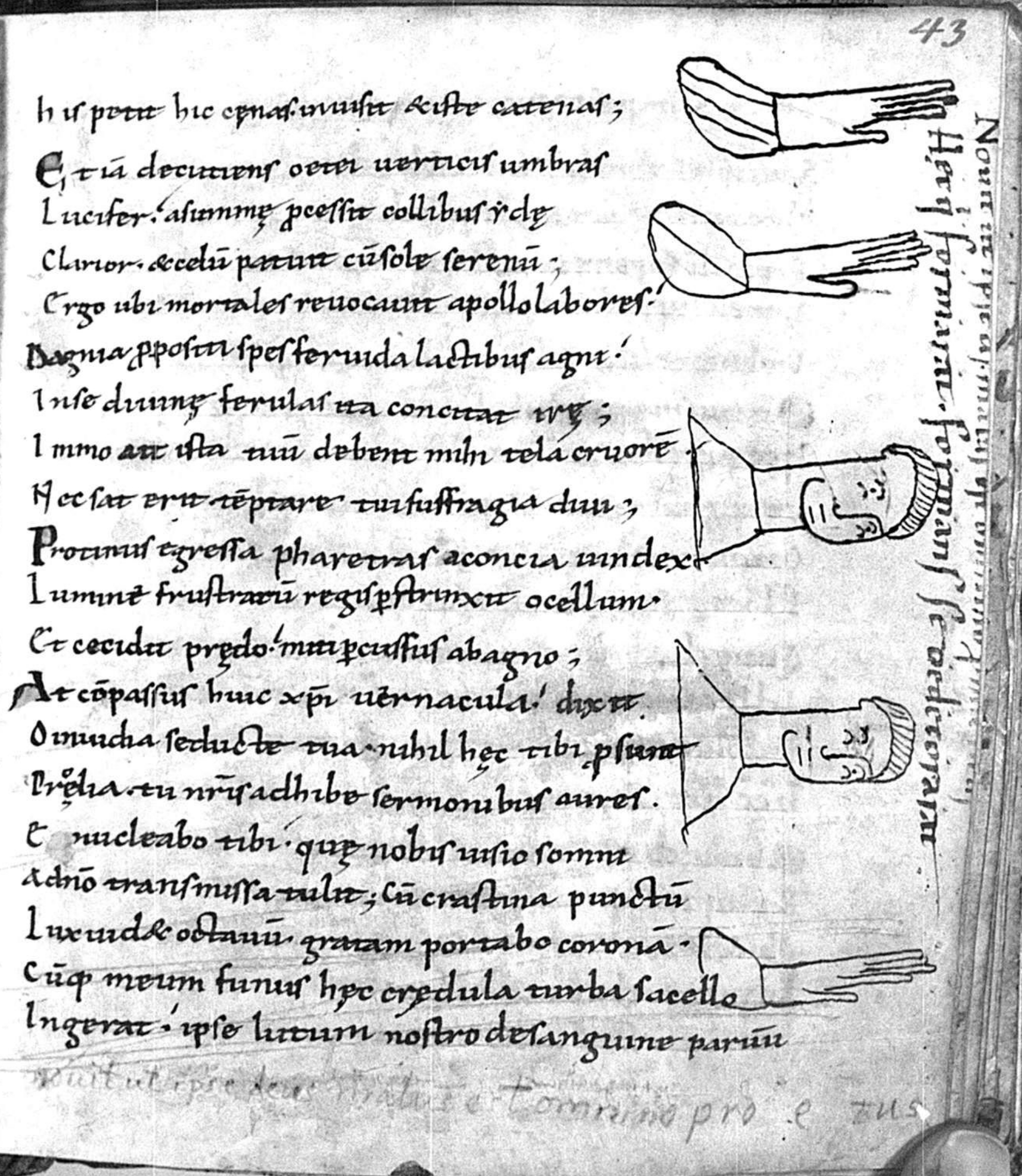
Manuscript of the Vita Sancti Christophori versibus et prosa oratione composita by Walter of Speyer, c. 986

The Western development of the legend begins with the German writer and later bishop Walter of Speyer who wrote two versions of the legend in Latin, one in verse and the other in prose which were first completed in 986 under the title Vita Sancti Christophori versibus et prosa oratione composita ('Life of the holy Christopher in verse and prose').

The legendary account that was to become the most influential in Europe is recounted in the 13th-century Latin Legenda aurea (Golden Legend). Many vernacular versions of the Christopher legends were written during the Middle Ages. The various legends regarding the saint and the translations and elaborations differ and contradict each other in many ways.

=== Greek Martyrdom of Christophoros ===
One of the oldest preserved written versions in Greek of the Christopher legend is the Martyrdom of Christophoros (referred to as BHG 309–310c). It starts with the issuing, in the fourth year of emperor Decius, of a decree requiring everyone to participate in pagan sacrificial rituals. A certain Reprebos is captured by the Romans in battle and then forced to join the Roman numerus Marmaritarum, i.e. a military unit made up by Marmaritae people. Reprebos is a physically repulsive Cynocephalus (i.e. a man with a dog's head) from a tribe of cannibals who is incapable of speaking "our language". After praying to his God he is granted the gift of language. He goes to a city to confront those who persecute the Christians and is struck by one of the persecutors. Reprebus does not retaliate. The person who struck him sends a report on the fearfully looking Reprebos to the emperor. The emperor sends 200 soldiers to capture or kill Reprebos. While sitting down to pray in front of a church, a miracle occurs as the staff of Reprebos blossoms with new growth. This strengthens his resolve. Found by the soldiers, Reprebos refuses their offer to falsely report they did not find him and thus delay his arrest. On the way to the city, the soldiers complain about their poor rations. Reprebos miraculously produces five loaves of bread with the help of the angel Raphael. The soldiers at once want to become Christians and are baptised together with Reprebos by the bishop Babylas in Antioch in Syria. Reprebos takes his new name Christophoros.

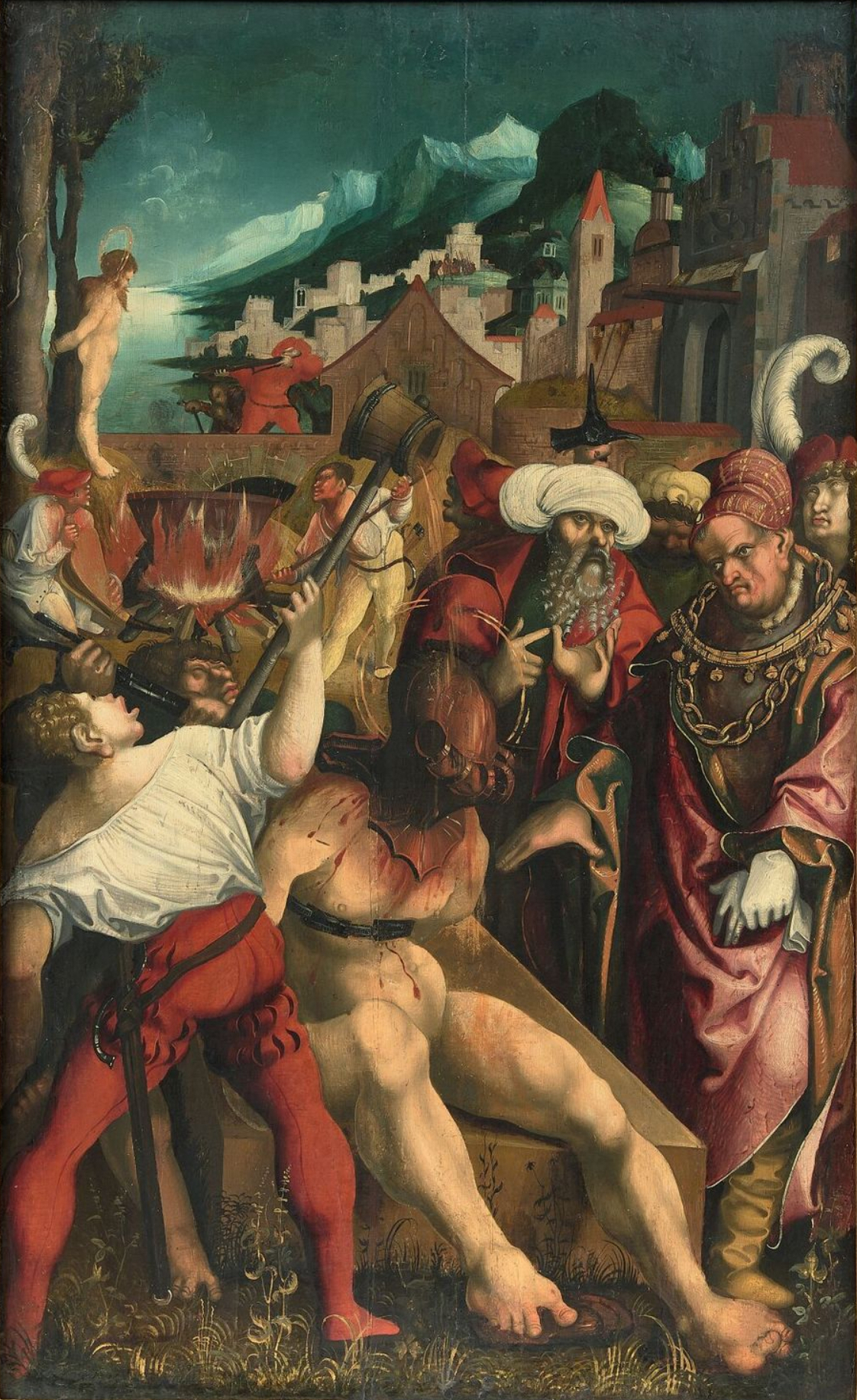
The martyrdom of Saint Christopher by the Master of St. Christopher with the devil, c. 1515

They travel on to Perga where Christophoros gets an audience with emperor Decius who is intimidated by his appearance. He refuses to yield to the emperor's pleas that he sacrifice to the pagan Gods. He is then severely tortured. The emperor attempts to lure him into making sacrifices to the pagan idols by sending him prostitutes called Aquilina and Kallinike who have been attractively made up. Christophoros prays to God for strength and manages to convert the women. When the women are summoned to the emperor they choose cruel martyrdom over renunciation of their newly adopted faith. Aquilina is murdered by being hung by her hair with two stones tied to her feet. Kallinike first pretends that she agrees to sacrifice to the Greek Gods but then turns around and insults the effigies of these Gods and casts them down. She is executed by being impaled horizontally on a spit with stones hung from her hands and feet. The following day, the emperor again attempts to win over Christophoros, who remains steadfast in his faith. The 200 soldiers who had earlier converted declare to the emperor that they have become Christians and followers of Christophoros. After unsuccessfully trying to cajole them back to their pagan beliefs, Decius orders that they be executed immediately and their bodies be burned. Christophoros is then again tortured and burned alive on a pyre, yet he remains unharmed. One thousand people immediately convert to Christianity. They save him from the flames and taunt the emperor who flees.

The emperor gets a visit from the devil disguised as a human who incites him against Christophoros. The next day the emperor orders everyone to sacrifice to the pagan Gods. When Christopher and his band of converts resist the order, the crowd is subsequently massacred. Christopher is thrown down a well with a heavy stone around his neck but the stone is crushed and the saint lifted out of the well by angels. The emperor orders a bronze cape to be heated up and put on him, but the saint remains unharmed again. The emperor finally orders his beheading. While being led to the place of execution, Christophoros asks the soldier taking him there for a moment to pray. The aspiring martyr asks Jesus to cause the evil emperor to die in demonic torment eating his own flesh. He also prays for his bodily relics to be given the power to drive away demons and prevent agricultural scourges such as hail, acts of god, bad grape harvests and droughts. A voice from the heavens replies, granting the requests. Christophoros then convinces the soldier to behead him. The soldier agrees reluctantly and immediately commits suicide after the execution. The bishop of Attaleia pays a hefty sum to retrieve Christophoros's body, which becomes a source of miracles. Emperor Decius becomes afflicted by a terrible disease which dissolves his body. In summary, the brief ministry of the martyr has resulted not only in his own death but also the demise of 201 soldiers, two prostitutes and at least 1,000 converted citizens as well as the serious illness of the emperor.

=== The Golden Legend ===
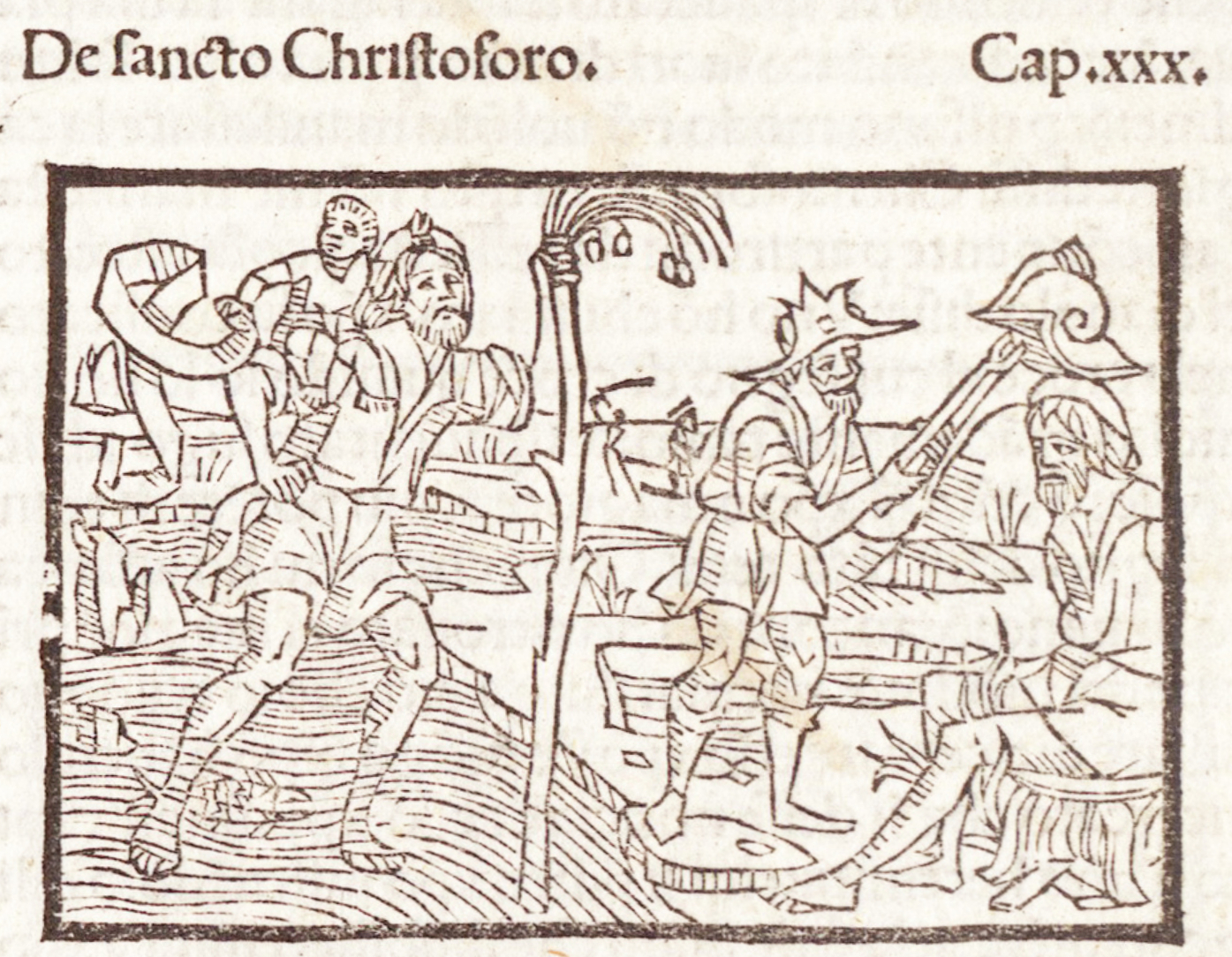
Saint Christopher in an Italian vernacular translation of the Golden Legend published in Milan in 1497

According to the legendary account of his life in the Golden Legend, Christopher is of Canaanite lineage. He is initially called Reprobus. He is 12 cubits tall (i.e. between 533 centimetres (210 in) to 628 centimetres (247 in) depending on which cubit standard is used) (in some later versions this number is reduced to 5 cubits). While serving the king of Canaan, he gets it into his head that he must go and serve "the greatest prince there was". He joins the king reputed to be the greatest, but one day he sees the king cross himself at the mention of the devil. On thus learning that the king fears the devil, he leaves to look for the devil. He comes across a band of marauders, one of whom declares himself to be the devil, so Christopher decides to serve him. When he sees his new master avoid a wayside cross, he realises that the devil fears Christ. He then leaves the service of the devil and enquires from people where to find Christ. He meets a hermit who instructs him in the Christian faith. Christopher asks him how he can serve Christ. When the hermit suggests fasting and prayer, Christopher replies that he is unable to perform that service. The hermit then suggests that because of his size and strength Christopher can serve Jesus by assisting people to cross a dangerous river. The hermit promises that this service will be pleasing to Christ.

After Christopher has performed this service for some time, a little child asks him to be taken across the river. During the crossing, the river starts to swell and the child feels as heavy as lead. Christopher can scarcely carry the child and finds himself in great difficulty. When he finally manages to reach the other side, he tells the child: "You have put me in the greatest danger. I do not think the whole world could have been as heavy on my shoulders as you were." The child replies: "You had on your shoulders not only the whole world but Him who made it. I am Christ your king, whom you are serving by this work." The child then vanishes.

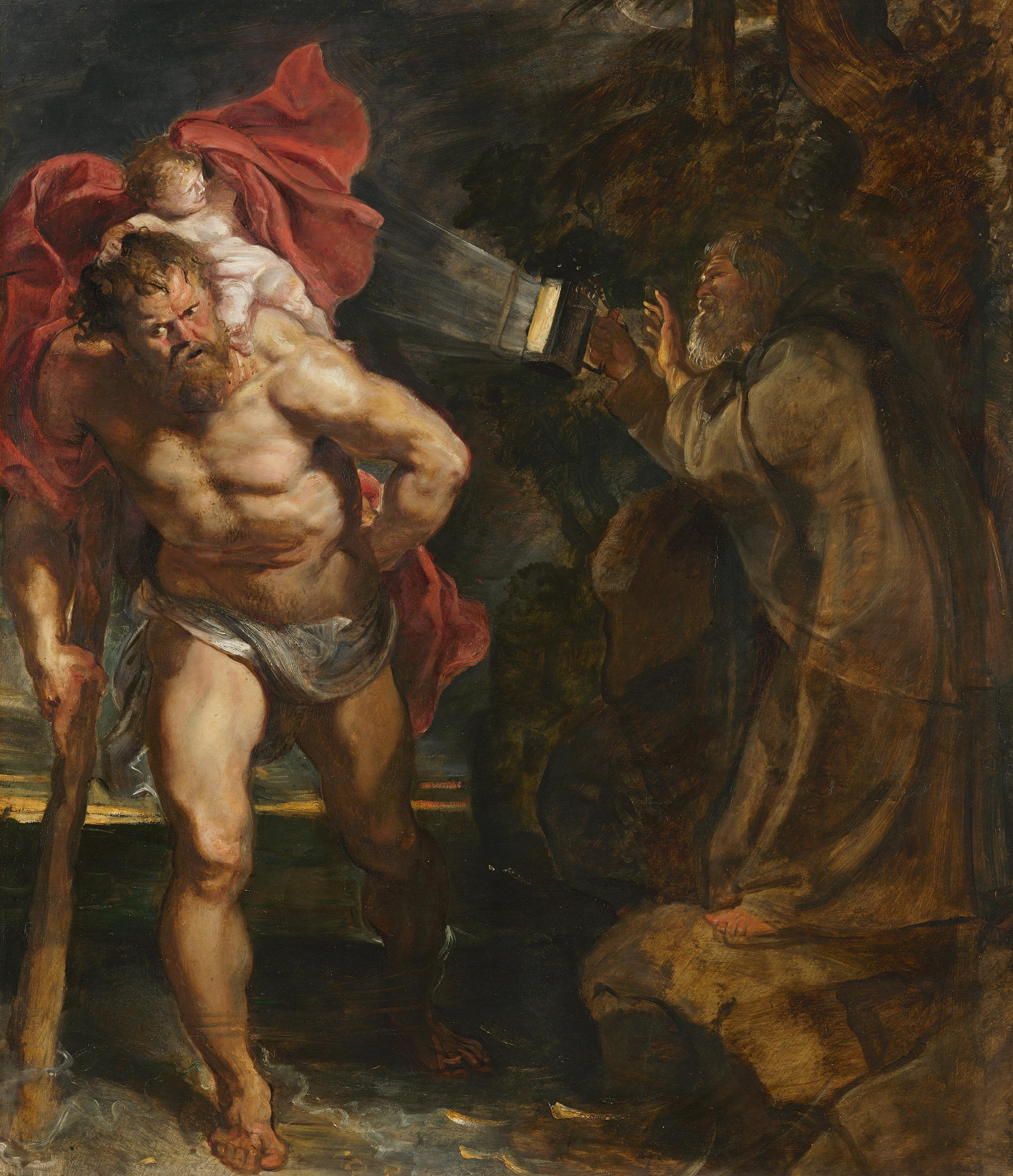
St. Christopher Carrying the Infant Christ with the Hermit, Rubens, 1610s

Christopher later visits Lycia. Upon his prayers, the Christian God bestows on him the gift to speak the local language. He goes to the placce where he comforts the Christians who are being martyred. He is hit in the face by the judges. He prays for the Christian God to make his walking stick bear fruit and flowers as this would facilitate his efforts to convert the people. After his prayer is answered, he converts 8,000 people. King Dagarus then sends two knights to fetch him but they don't dare to take him when they find him in prayer. More knights are then sent to fetch him. When they find him in prayer, they offer him the opportunity to flee but he refuses it. They then immediately convert. On his request they bind him and lead him to the king.

The king falls from his throne as soon as he sees Christopher. The king asks him about his background and later states that Christopher has a foolish name, as he is named after Christ who was crucified and could not help himself and neither can he benefit Christopher. The king asks him why he refuses to sacrifice to their Gods. Christopher then in turn insults the king's name and his Gods whom he states to be "made with the hands of men." The king gives him the choice to offer sacrifice to the pagan Gods and receive gifts or refuse to make such offerings and then die a painful death. Upon Christopher's refusal to sacrifice he is thrown in jail and the knights who were converted by him are executed. The king sends two beautiful women named Bisena and Aquilina to the jail with the promise of a royal reward if they can tempt the saint into sin. Christopher converts the women to Christianity, as he had earlier converted thousands in the city. The women are later told by the king that they will die if they don't sacrifice to the pagan Gods. The women pretend that they will make the offers but instead they destroy all the effigies of the Gods. They are then executed in a painful manner. The king orders Christopher to be killed. Various methods are attempted to execute the saint, including shooting him with arrows. One of the arrows returns suddenly and pierces the king's eye blinding it. The execution attempts initially fail until he is successfully martyred by beheading. In an interesting twist in the legend, the king applies some of the martyr's blood to his blinded eye which is immediately healed. The king then becomes a believer in the Christian God and orders any person who blames the Christian God or Saint Christopher to be put to the sword.

=== Other legendary accounts ===
According to the medieval Irish Passion of St. Christopher, "This Christopher was one of the Dog-heads, a race that had the heads of dogs and ate human flesh." The German bishop and poet Walter of Speyer portrayed St. Christopher in his Vita et passio sancti Christopher martyris as a giant of a cynocephalic species in the land of the Chananeans who ate human flesh and barked. Eventually, Christopher meets the infant Jesus, regrets his former behavior and receives baptism. He is further rewarded with a human appearance, whereupon he devotes his life to Christian service as an athlete of God and one of the soldier saints.

Some Eastern Orthodox communities, particularly in south-eastern Europe, saw the development of legends in which St. Christopher was initially a handsome man rather than the ugly dog-headed saint of the traditional stories. An unpublished copy of the life of St. Christopher dated to the 13th century in the library of the Great Lavra monastery on Mount Athos recounts that this good-looking St. Christopher came from a ridge of rocky hills resembling dog heads named Cynoscephale located near the ancient city of Scotussa in Thessaly, Greece. This new detail in the story proposes an alternative explanation for why the earlier traditions described the saint as having the head of a dog. According to a folk tradition in Cyprus, the martyr led a solitary life and was God-fearing and handsome, which attracted local women. Wanting to avoid temptation, St. Christopher prayed to God to disfigure him upon which he was given his dog head.

== Veneration and patronage ==
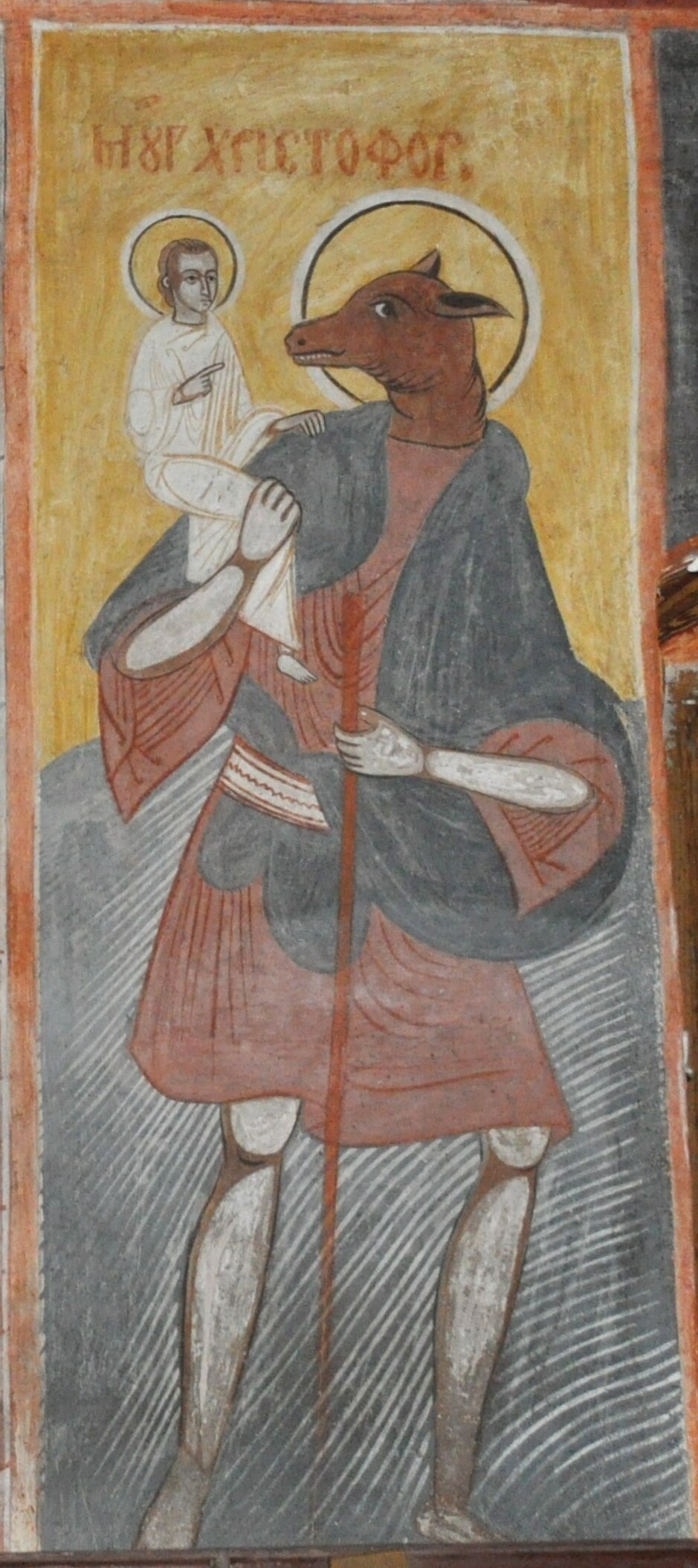
Dog-headed St. Christopher carrying the Infant Jesus (1806), Fresco in Nașterea Domnului Church, Sărata, Romania

=== Eastern Orthodox liturgy ===
The Eastern Orthodox Church remembers Christopher as the "Great Martyr Christopher" on a feast day on 9 May. The liturgical reading and hymns refer to his imprisonment by Decius who tempts Christopher with prostitutes before ordering his beheading. The Kontakion in the Fourth Tone (hymn) reads:

Thou who wast terrifying both in strength and in countenance, for thy Creator's sake thou didst surrender thyself willingly to them that sought thee; for thou didst persuade both them and the women that sought to arouse in thee the fire of lust, and they followed thee in the path of martyrdom. And in torments thou didst prove to be courageous. Wherefore, we have gained thee as our great protector, O great Christopher.

=== Roman Catholic liturgy ===
The Roman Martyrology remembers him on 25 July. The Tridentine calendar commemorates him on the same day only in private Masses. His commemoration was of relatively late date (around 1550). By 1954 his commemoration was extended to all Masses, but it was dropped in 1970 from the general calendar and restricted to particular calendars of the Roman rite.

=== Relics ===
The Museum of Sacred Art at Saint Justine's Church (Sveta Justina) in Rab, Croatia, claims a gold-plated reliquary holds the skull of St. Christopher. According to church tradition, a bishop showed the relics from the city wall in 1075 in order to end a siege of the city by an Italo-Norman army.

The Cathedral of St. James in Šibenik holds a relic which is claimed to be the incorrupt leg of the saint. It was brought over in 1484 from Constantinople through Corfu and originally intended to be transferred to Korčula. The feast day of Saint Christopher is celebrated on 27 July in Šibenik.

Greek Orthodox churches in Grevena, Filothei, and Siatista claim to hold relics of the saint.

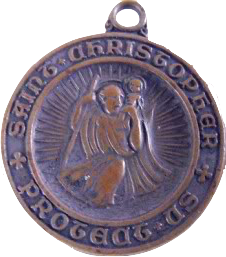
A bronze St. Christopher medallion

=== Medals and holy cards ===
Devotional medals with St. Christopher's name and image are commonly worn as pendants, especially by travelers, to show devotion and as a request for his blessing. Miniature statues are frequently displayed in automobiles. In French a widespread phrase for such medals is Regarde St Christophe et va-t-en rassuré ("Look at Saint Christopher and go on reassured", sometimes translated as "Behold Saint Christopher and go your way in safety"). Saint Christopher medals and holy cards in Spanish carry the phrase Si en San Cristóbal confías, de accidente no morirás ("If you trust St. Christopher, you won't die in an accident").

=== General patronage ===
St. Christopher was a widely popular saint, especially revered in the Roman Catholic Church by people, athletes, mariners, ferrymen, and travelers. The Roman Catholic Church regards the saint as one of the Fourteen Holy Helpers, a small group of saints believed to be particularly effective, especially against various diseases. He holds patronage of things related to travel and travelers—against lightning and pestilence—and patronage for archers; bachelors; boatmen; soldiers; bookbinders; epilepsy; floods; fruit dealers; fullers; gardeners; a holy death; mariners; market carriers; motorists and drivers; sailors; storms; surfers; toothache; mountaineering; and transportation workers.

Because certain traditions believed that gazing on the saint offered protection against sudden death, images of the saint were placed on the gates of cities, bridges and at the entrance of churches (typically on the northern wall opposite the porch).

=== Patronage of places ===
Christopher is the patron saint of many places, including: Baden, Germany; Barga, Italy; Brunswick, Germany; Mecklenburg, Germany; Rab, Croatia; Roermond, the Netherlands; Saint Christopher's Island (Saint Kitts); Toses, Catalonia, Spain; Mondim de Basto, Portugal; Agrinio, Greece; Vilnius, Lithuania; Riga, Latvia; Havana, Cuba; San Cristóbal, Dominican Republic; Paete, Laguna, Philippines; and Tivim, Goa, India.

==== Toponomy ====
Numerous places are named for the saint, including Saint Christopher Island, the official name of the Caribbean island of Saint Kitts, and St. Christopher Island in Antarctica. Many places are named after the saint in other languages, for example Saint-Christophe is a common French place name. Similarly, San Cristóbal is a place name in many Spanish-speaking or Spanish-influenced countries, and the São Cristóvão is in use throughout the Lusophone world.

=== Iconography ===
In the iconography of Western Christianity, he is usually depicted from the late Middle Ages as a soldier in the army, wearing armor, in uniform, or as a bearded giant with a child on his shoulder and a staff in one hand. From the Northern Renaissance at the end of the fifteenth century the saint is most often depicted with a fluttering pink or reddish cloak.

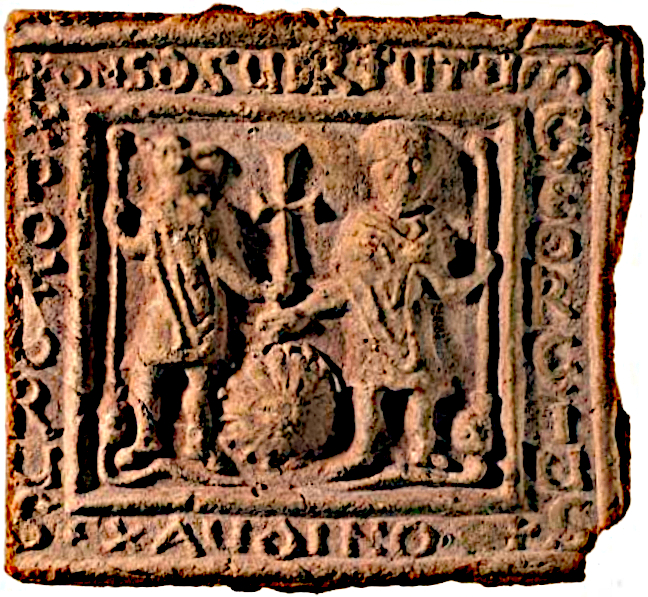
Terracotta Icon of Saints Christopher and George found in Vinica

In Eastern Orthodox Church art, the saint is variously depicted as a young man, a martyr in a red himation with a cross in his hand or a warrior on horseback. In addition, there are also depictions of the saint as a man with the head of an animal, most often a dog, but also a lamb or horse. The roots of the dog-head iconography lie in the early sources for the Christopher legends which clearly describe the protagonist as a cynocephalus, i.e a person with the head of a dog. It is not clear when this type of representation started as most early Christian artworks were destroyed during the 8th and 9th century Byzantine Iconoclasms. On a terracotta icon dated to the 5th or 6th century found at Vinicko Kale, Vinica, North Macedonia (Archaeological Museum of North Macedonia) St. Christopher and St. George are presented at full length, wearing tunics and a mantle. Both saints are holding spears, which pierce a snake (dragon) with a man-like head at their feet. The two saints appear to be represented as warrior martyrs and dragon slayers. St. Christopher is depicted with the head of a dog which demonstrates that this iconography appeared almost contemporaneously with the spread of the cult of St. Christopher in the East itself. The dog-headed depiction of St. Christopher on the Vinica icon shows the influence of Egyptian statues of people with animal heads and, in particular, the depictions of the Graeco-Egyptian God Hermanubis, who is the product of the syncretism of Hermes from Greek mythology and Anubis from Egyptian mythology.

Images of St. Christopher with a dog's head appeared in Russian icon painting from the second half of the 16th century and became very popular in Russia. After a Synod of the Russian Church held in 1722 banned the dog-head imagery, St. Christopher was only allowed to be depicted in an anthropomorphic form. During the following centuries the iconography of the saint as a warrior with a dog-head continued, however, within the traditionalist Old Believers environment and in other Orthodox churches not subject to the Russian Church's Synod. The ban on the Old Believers' practices was lifted in 1971. The facial expression of the dog-headed saint was initially aggressive as he would typically be shown baring his teeth. The expression was gradually softened, presumably in order to create a serene, meek and gentle face, reminiscent of a lamb, which was closer to what was expected of a Christian.

In the Balkan region there were also a number of representations of the martyr with the head of a lamb. From the 13th century, Byzantine art developed a tradition of depicting the martyr alongside holy doctors. This type of depiction was also adopted in the Eastern Orthodox churches.

== Gallery ==
Saint Christopher in art

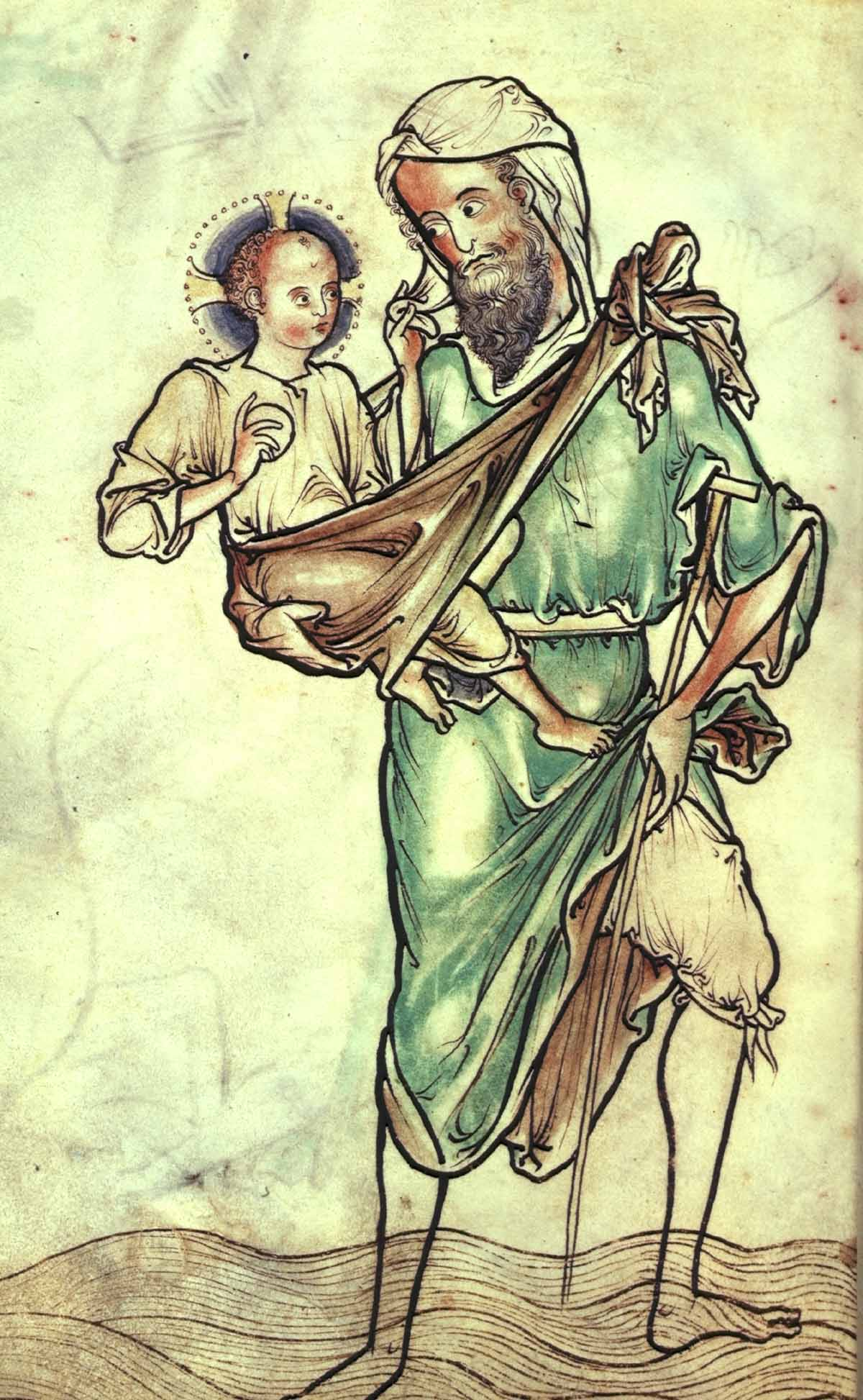
St. Christopher, from the Westminster Psalter, c. 1250

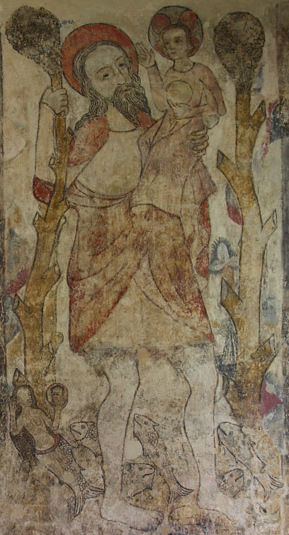
St. Christopher, St Botolph's Church, Northamptonshire, England, 14th century

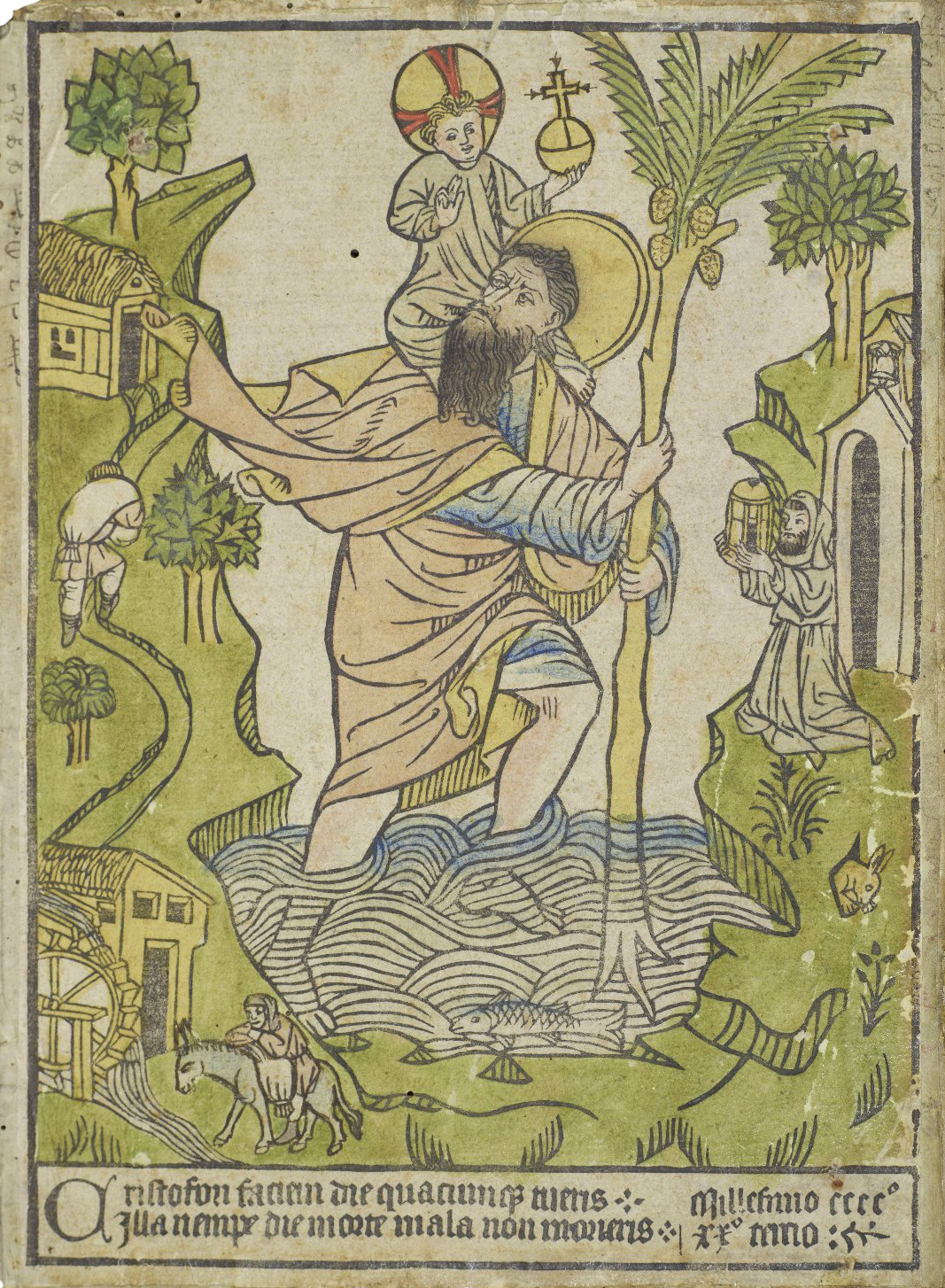
St. Christopher, earliest dated woodcut in Europe, 1423, Buxheim

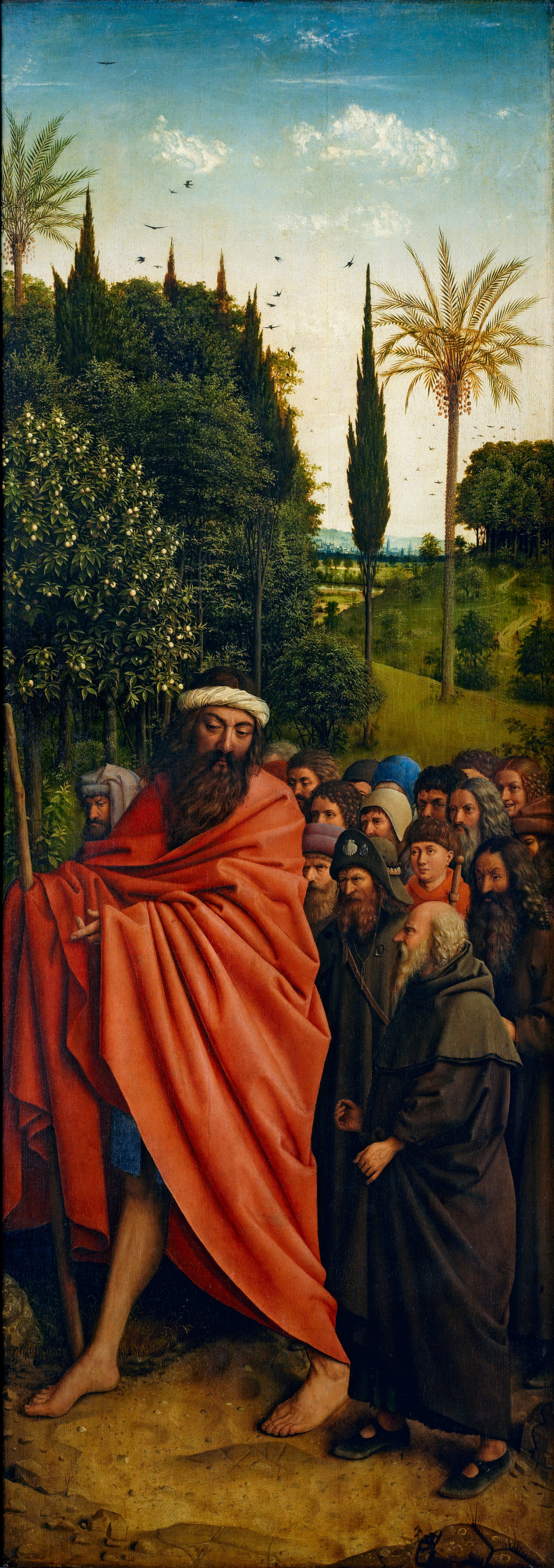
St Christopher and the pilgrims, right panel of the Ghent Altarpiece, c. 1432, Jan and Hubert van Eyck

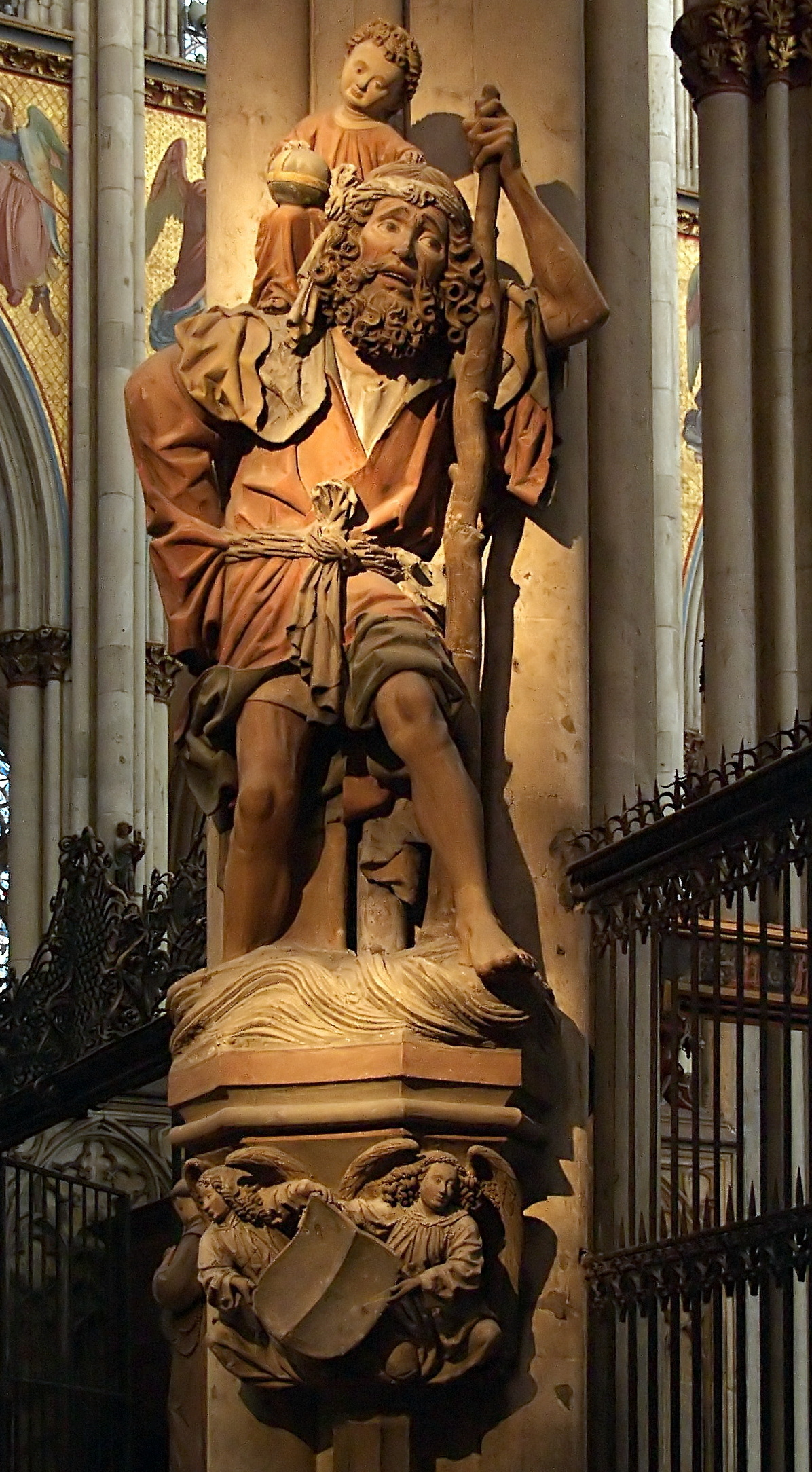
Saint Christopher by Master Tilman, c. 1480

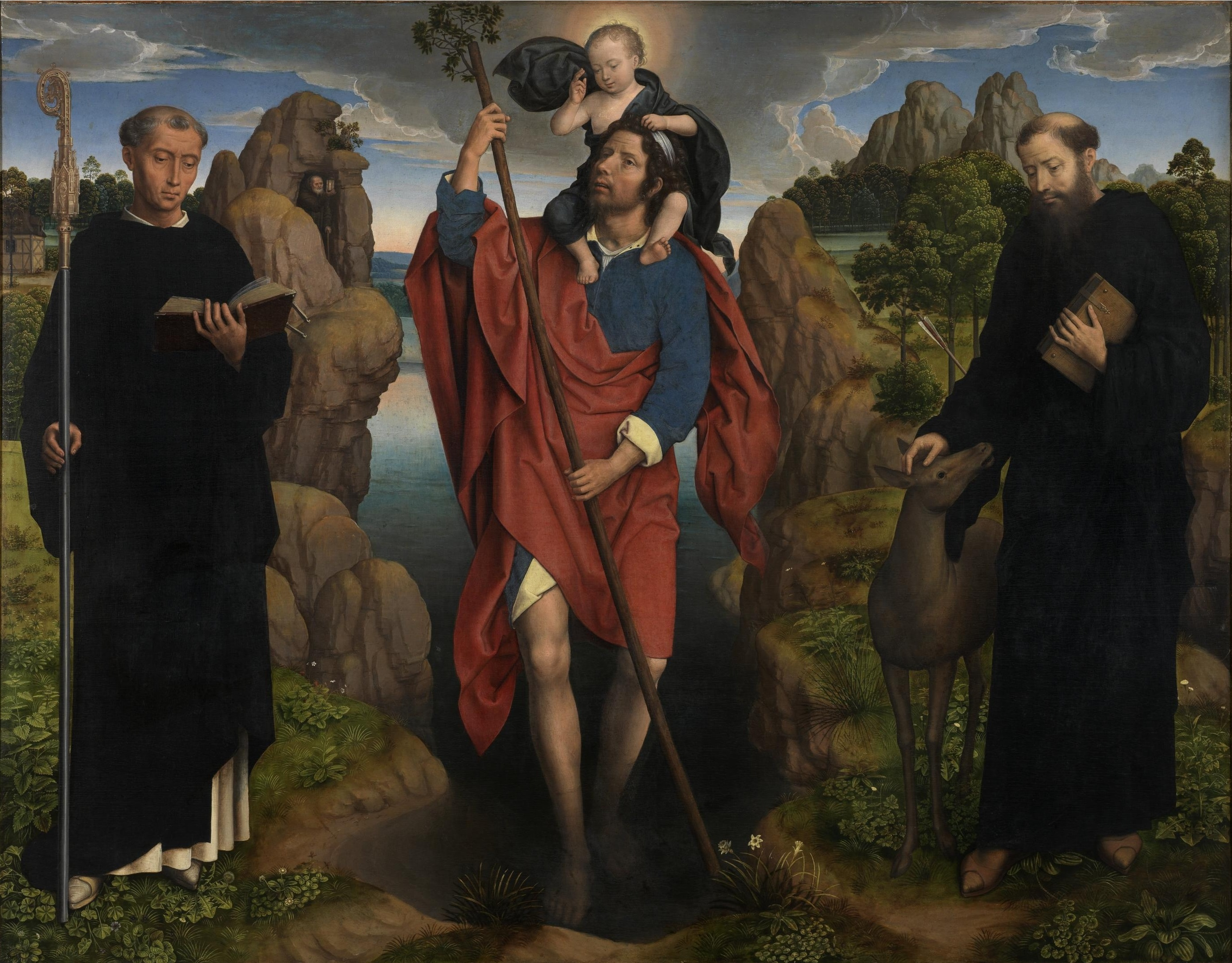
St. Christopher with Saints Maurus and Giles by Hans Memling, 1484

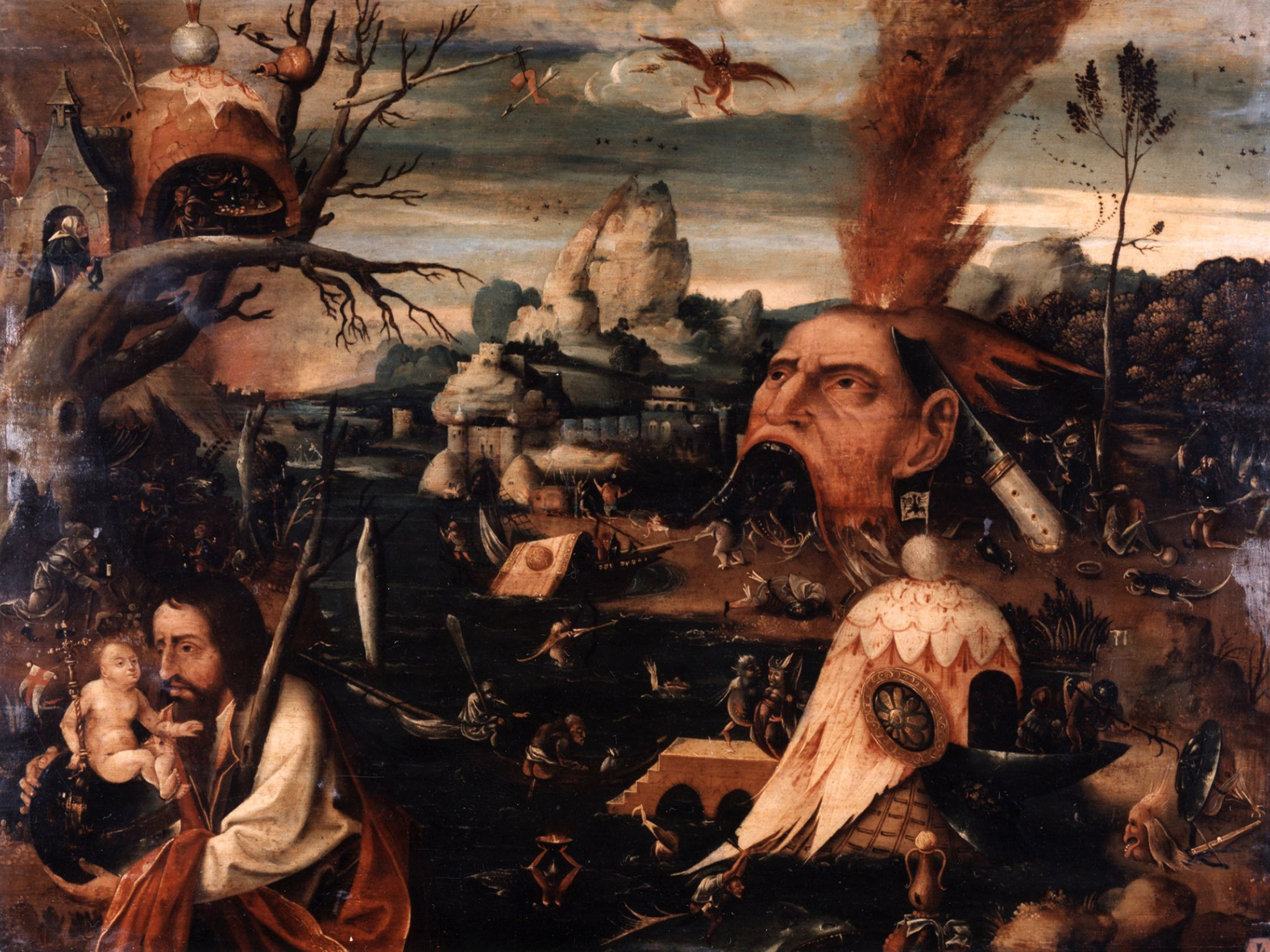
Saint Christopher in a landscape with devilry, Anonymous Antwerp master, 1500–1550

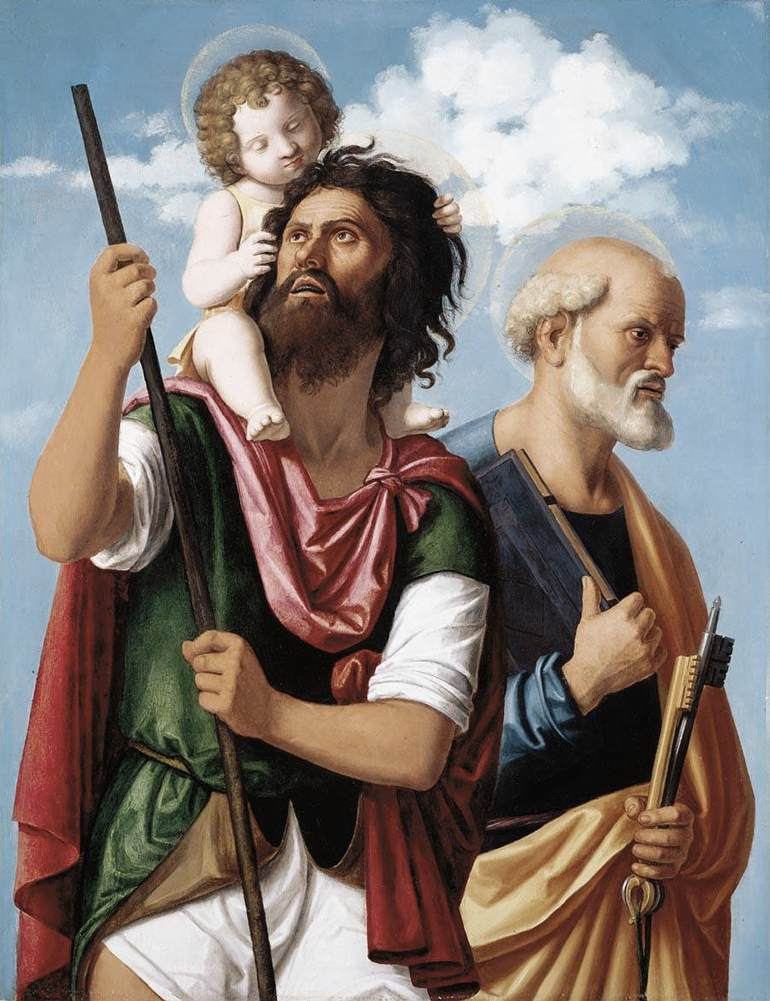
Saint Christopher with the Infant Jesus and St Peter by Giovanni Battista Cima da Conegliano, c. 1505

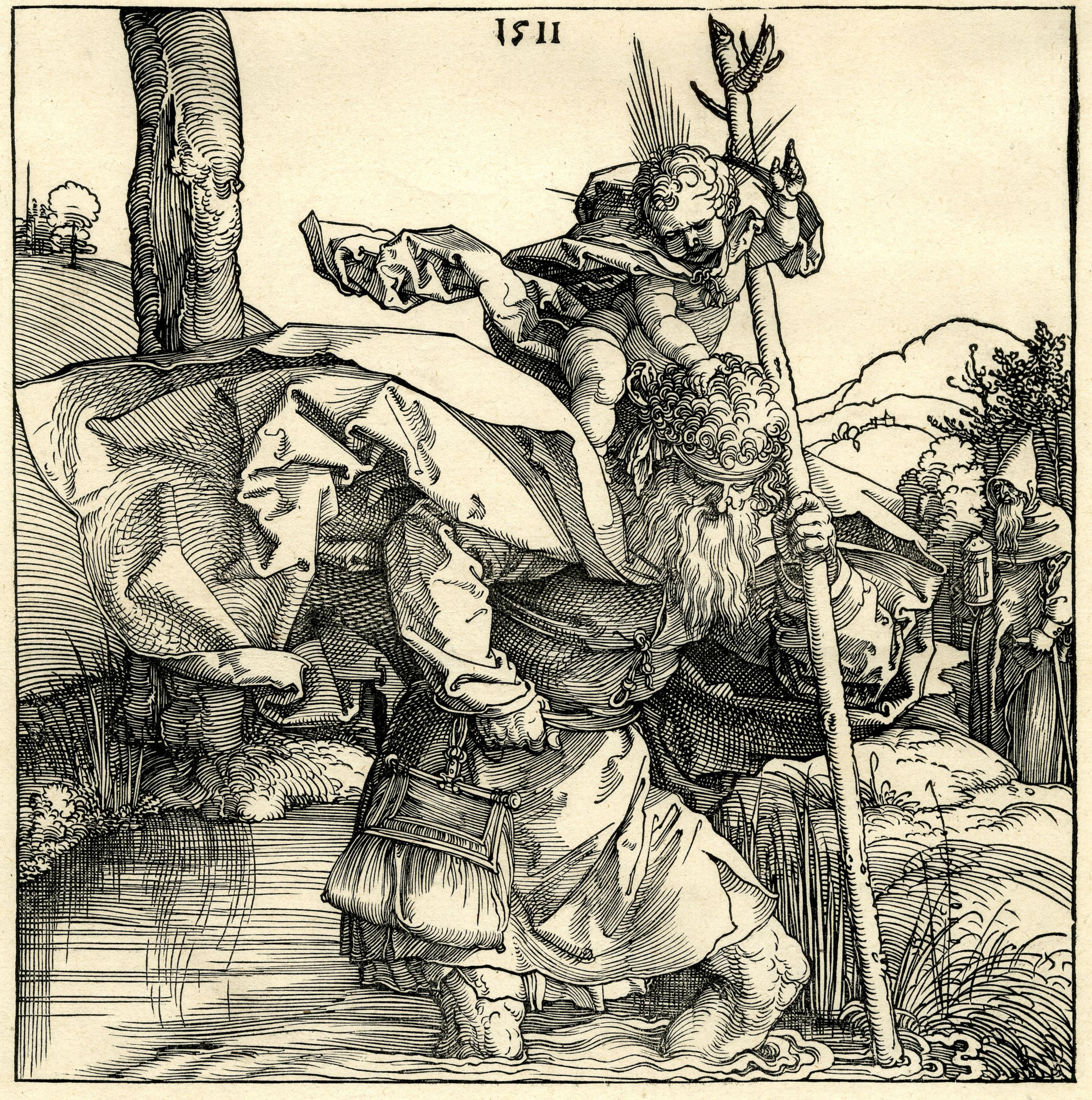
Saint Christopher by Albrecht Dürer, 1511

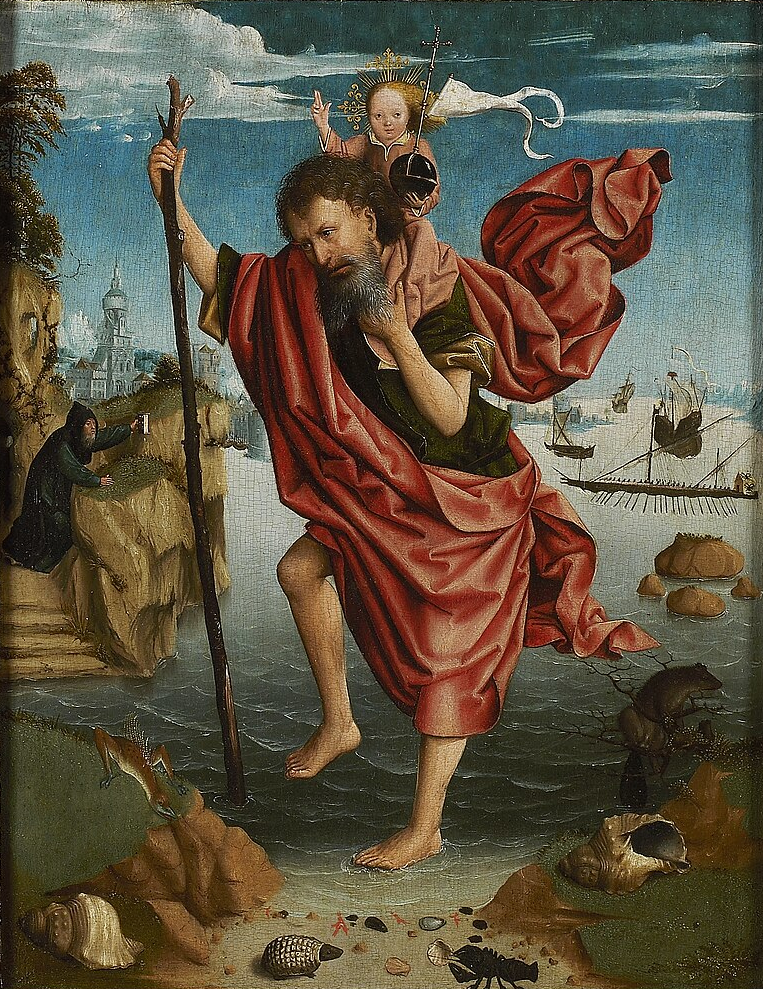
St. Christopher carrying the Infant Jesus by the Master of the Legend of the Magdalen, 1510s

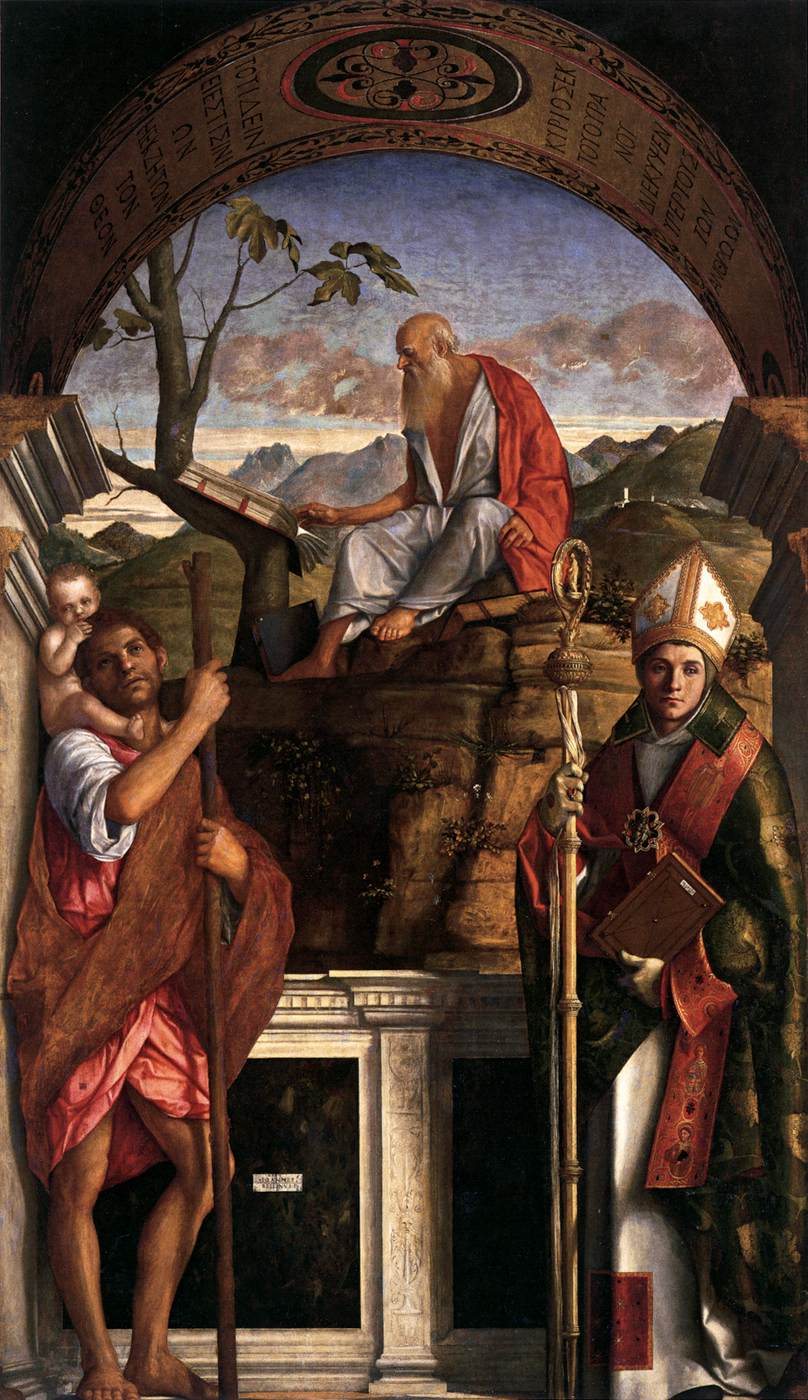
Saints Christopher, Jerome and Louis of Toulouse by Giovanni Bellini, 1513

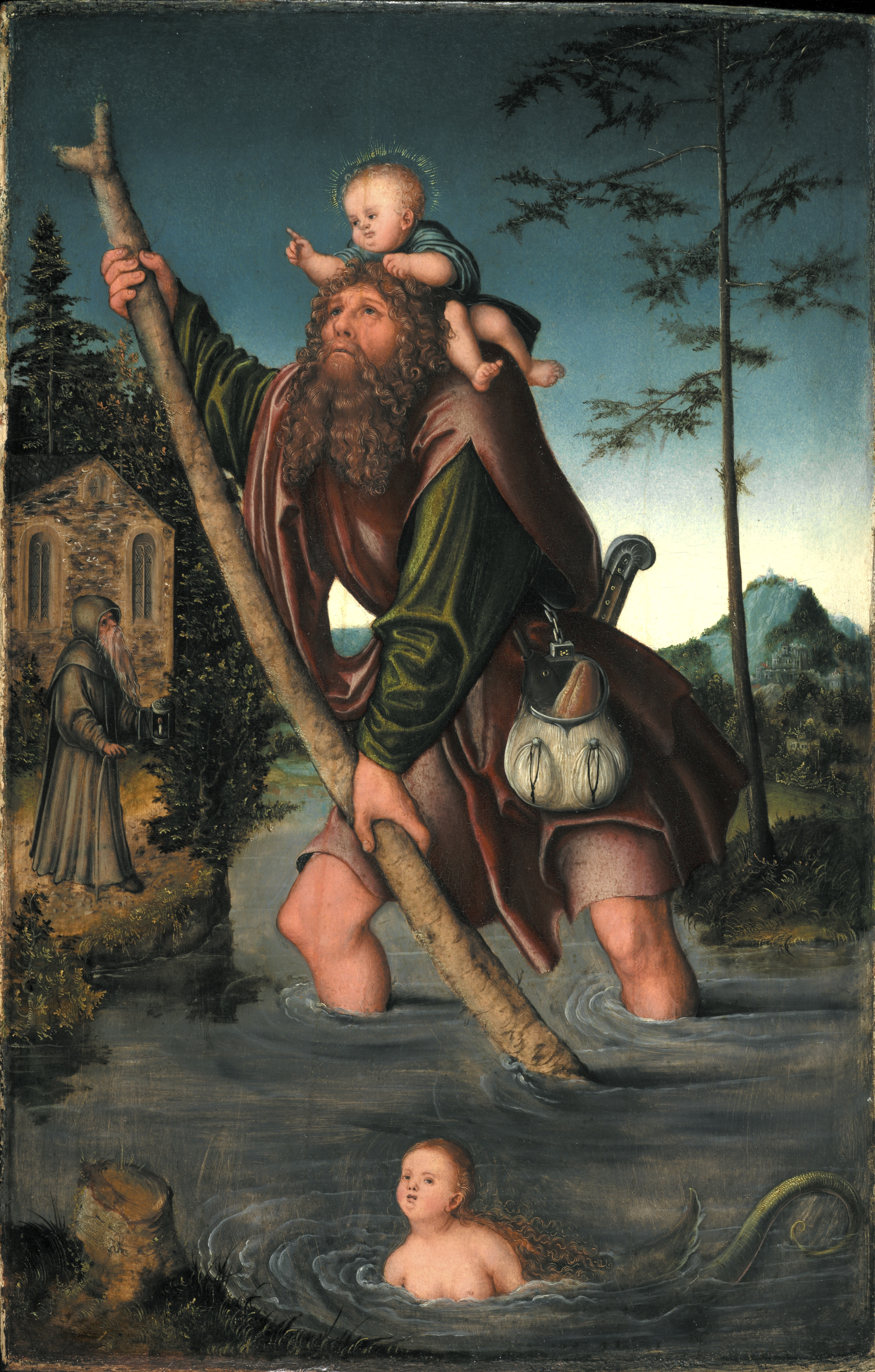
St. Christopher Carrying the Infant Jesus by Lucas Cranach the Elder, c. 1519

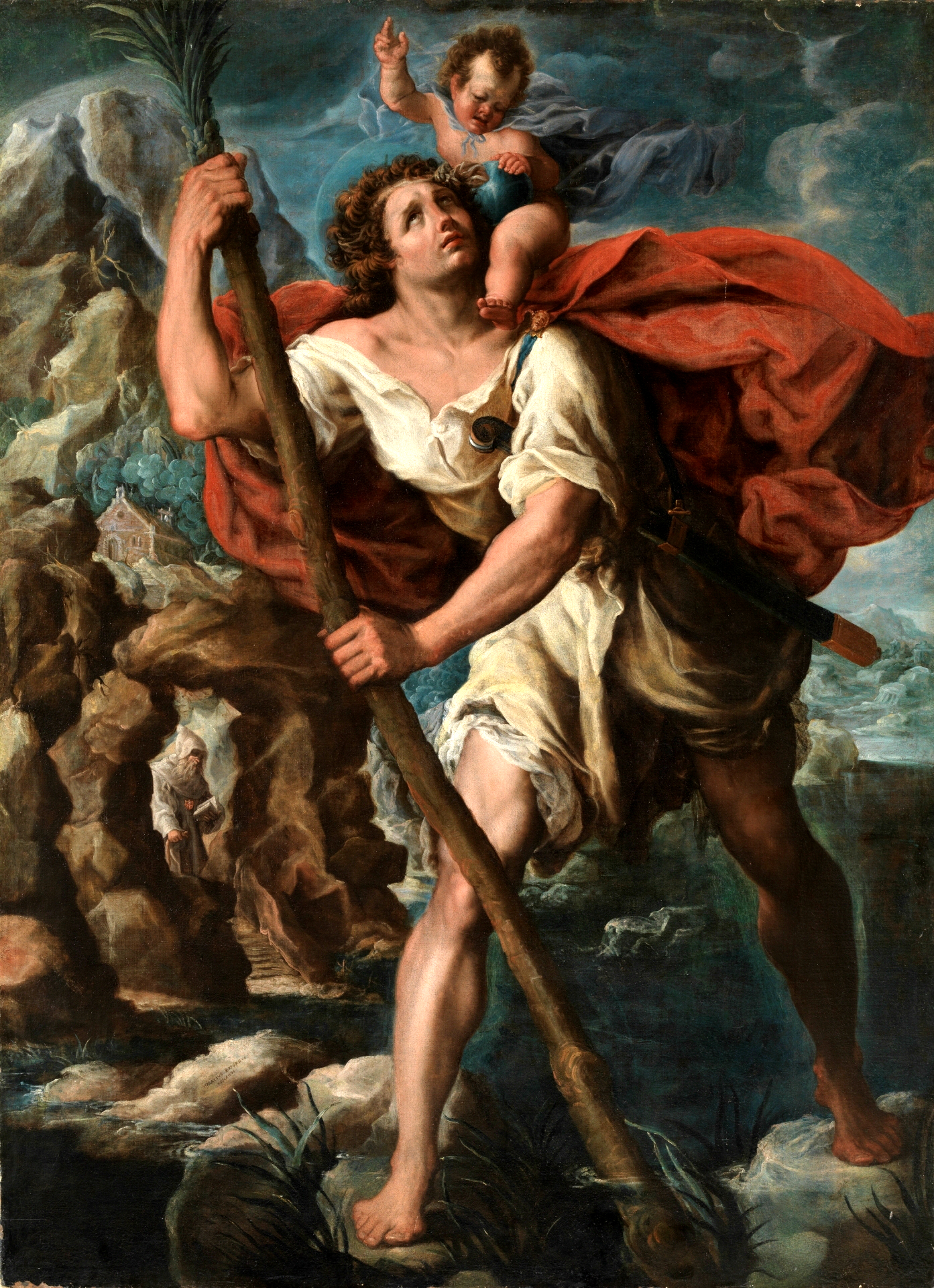
St. Christopher by Orazio Borgianni, c. 1600

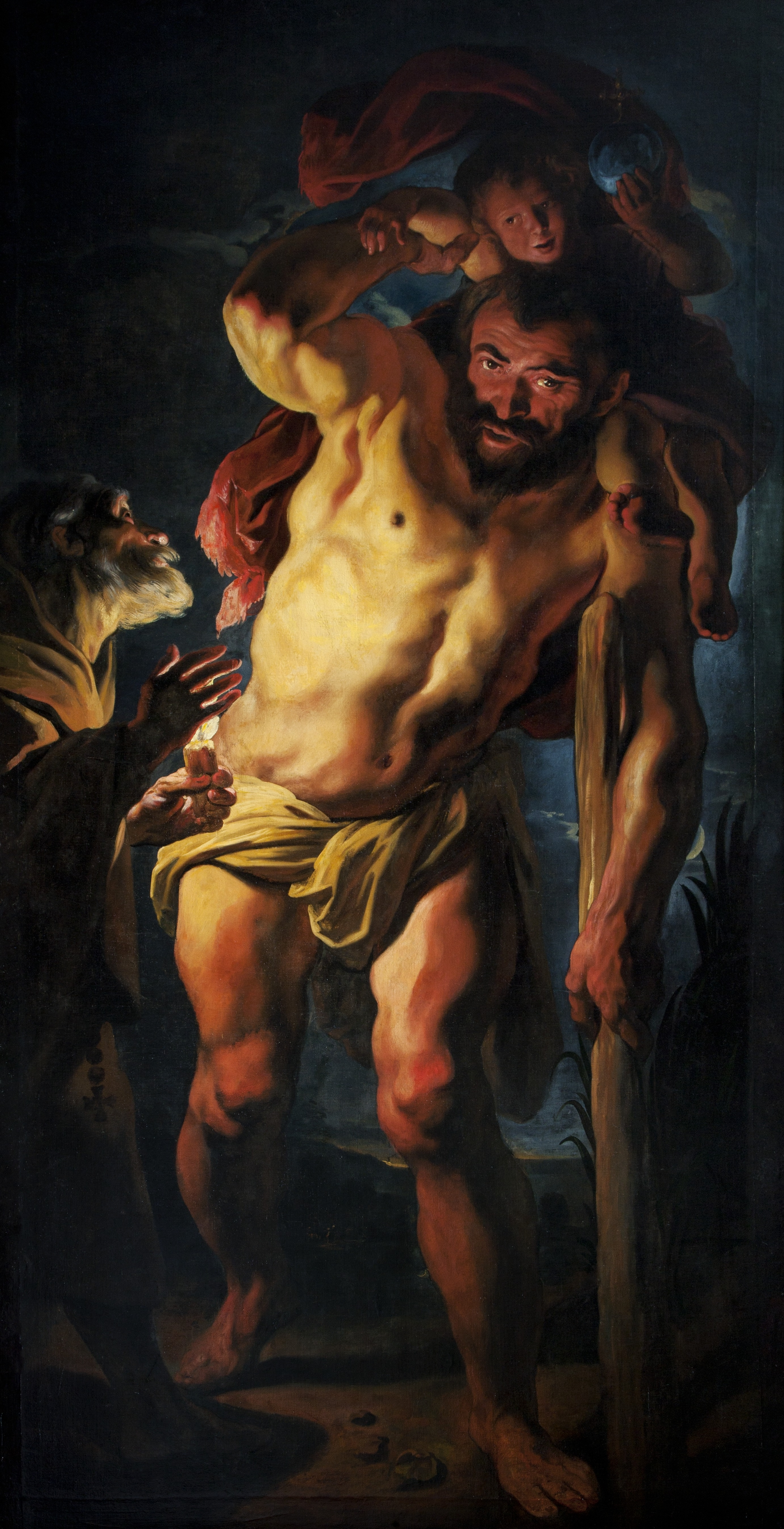
St. Christopher Carrying the Infant Jesus by Jacob Jordaens, c. 1625–1630

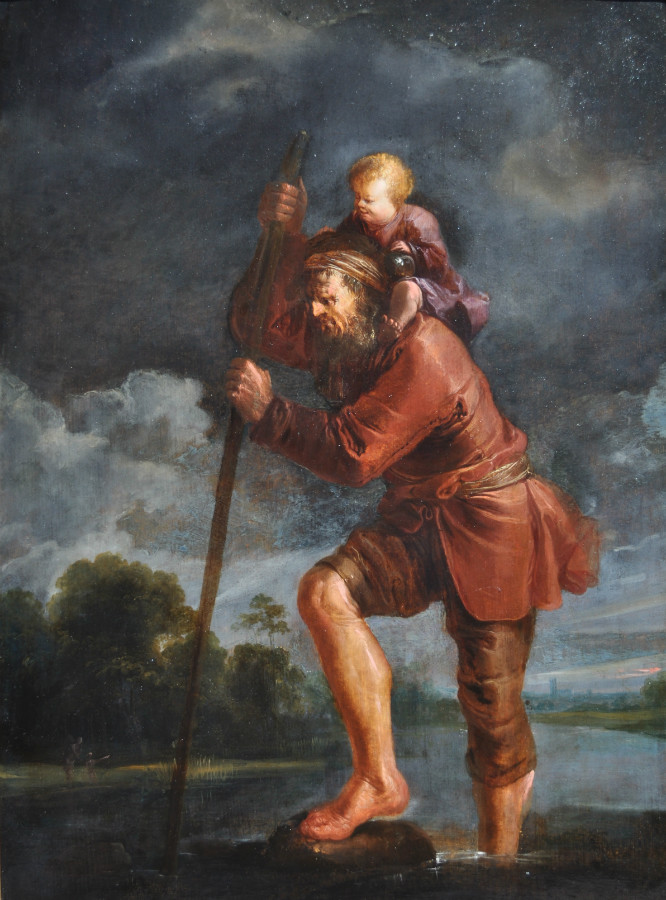
Saint Christopher carrying the Infant Jesus by Jan van de Venne, c. 1631–1651

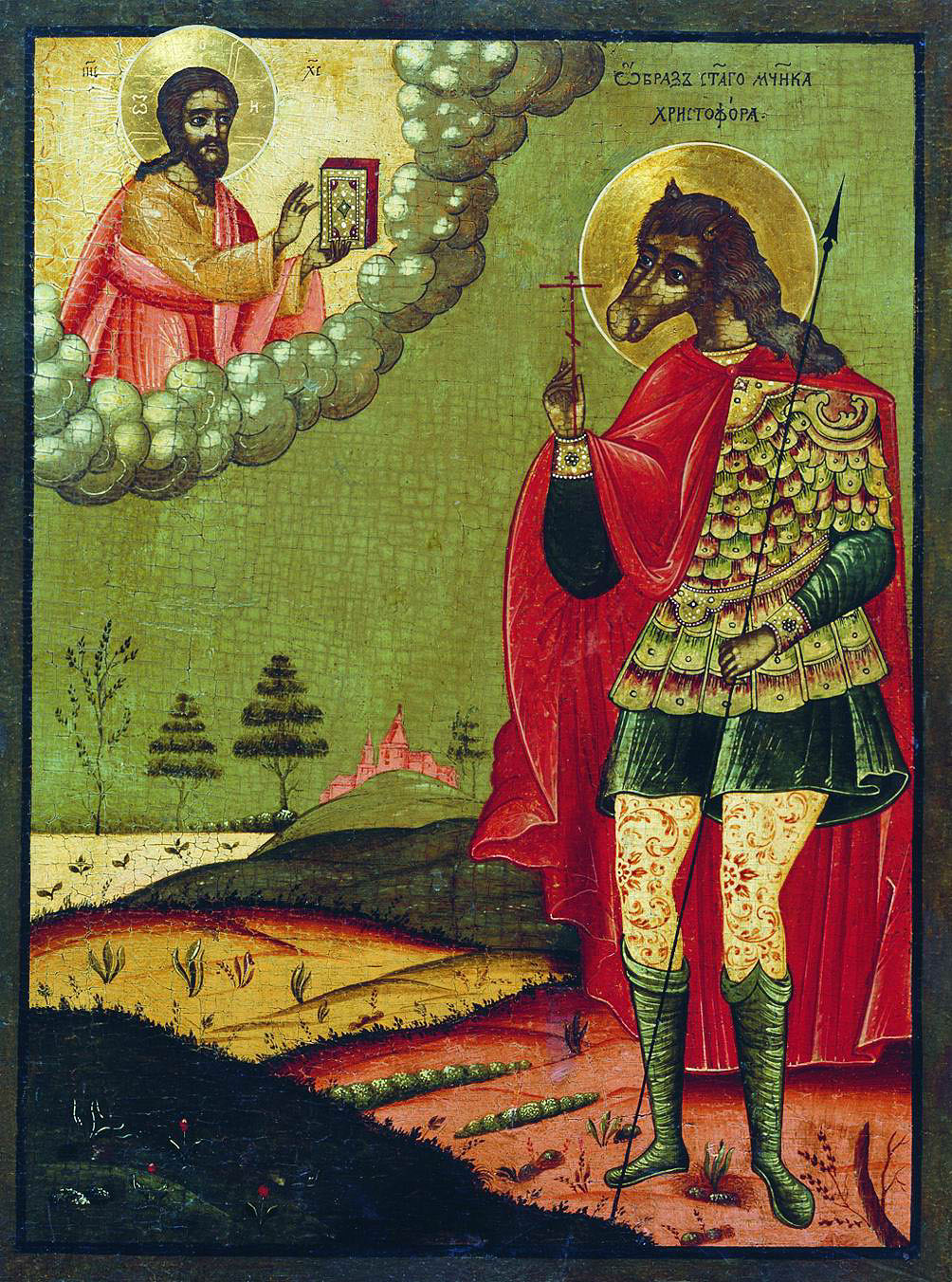
Saint Christopher, Russian icon, 18th century

Fresco from Panagia tou Araka, 1192

Mosaic from Hosios Loukas, 11th century
