= Woman as a Wise Virgin =

Painting by Sebastiano del Piombo

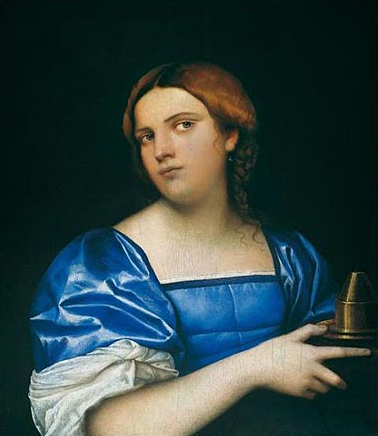
Woman as a Wise Virgin (c. 1510) by Sebastiano del Piombo

Woman as a Wise Virgin is a circa 1510 oil on canvas painting by Sebastiano del Piombo, now in the National Gallery of Art in Washington.

It shows its model as one of the wise virgins from the parable of the Wise and Foolish Virgins. Its model also appears in Salome with the Head of John the Baptist and as Mary Magdalene in St John Chrysostom Altarpiece, both of a similar date - she may have been a lover of the artist.

The work was recorded as being owned by Jacobus van Veerle and his wife Jan in Antwerp in 1650. It was later recorded in Edward White's collection in London in 1870 and - via a Christie's auction and with Colnaghi as an intermediary - then passed to Sir Francis Cook at Doughty House in Richmond upon Thames. His descendants eventually sold it in 1947 to the Samuel H. Kress Foundation, who donated it to its present owner in 1952.
