= San Giovanni Grisostomo, Venice =

Church in Venice, Italy

Coordinates: 45°26′21″N 12°20′14″E

Church of San Giovanni Grisostomo
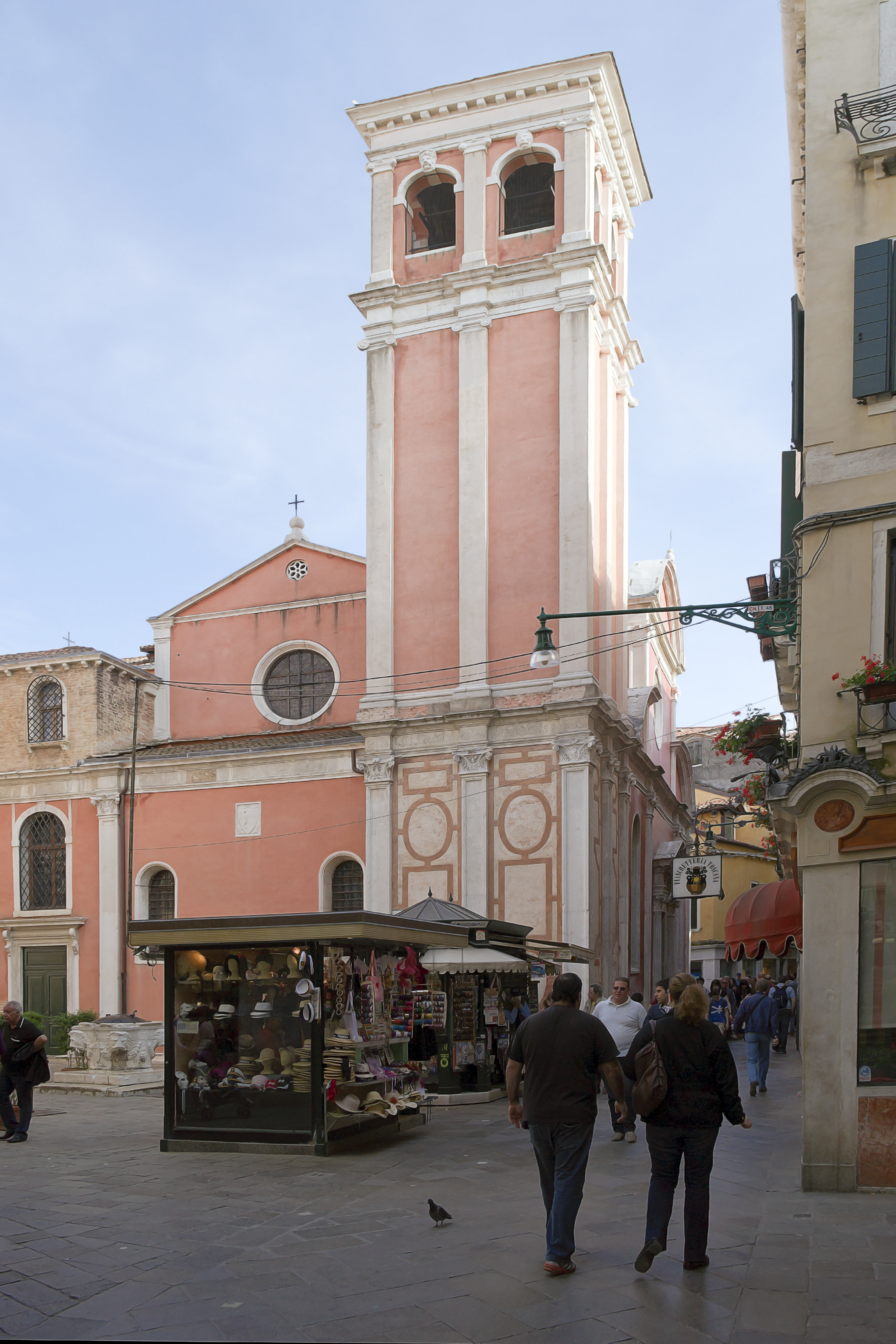

- Location within Venice Location within Italy

Religion
- Affiliation: Roman Catholic
- Province: Venice

Location
- Location: Venice, Italy

Architecture
- Architects: Mauro Codussi & son
- Type: Church
- Style: Renaissance
- Completed: 1525

San Giovanni Grisostomo (English: Saint John Chrysostom) is a small church in the sestiere or neighborhood of Cannaregio, Venice.

The church was founded in 1080, destroyed by fire in 1475, then rebuilt starting in 1497 by Mauro Codussi and his son, Domenico. Construction was completed in 1525. The bell tower dates from the late 16th century. The interior is based on a Greek cross design.

Behind the façade are hung two canvasses, formerly organ doors, by Giovanni Mansueti depicting Saints Onuphrius, Agatha, Andrew and John Chrysostom. Onuphrius was the co-titular patron saint who was revered by the confraternity of the Tentori (dyers of fabrics, covers, and sheets). In 1516, a relic of the saint, his finger, was donated to this church.

The chapel on the right has the painting Saints Christopher, Jerome and Louis of Toulouse (1513) by Giovanni Bellini. On the left rear the chapel of the Rosary or Madonna della Grazie has an altarpiece of Saints John Chrysostom, John the Baptist, John the Evangelist, Theodore, Mary Magdalene, Lucy and Catherine by Sebastiano del Piombo, commissioned by Caterina Contarini. On the wall of the apse is a series of canvases on the life of Saint John Chrysostom and Christ. On the high altar is a relief of the Deposition from the Cross. To the left is the chapel built for Giacomo Bernabò, with sculptural design by Codussi. The marble altarpiece of the Coronation of the Virgin (1500–1502) was completed by Tullio Lombardo.

Ceiling: God the Father, fresco by Giuseppe Diamantini.

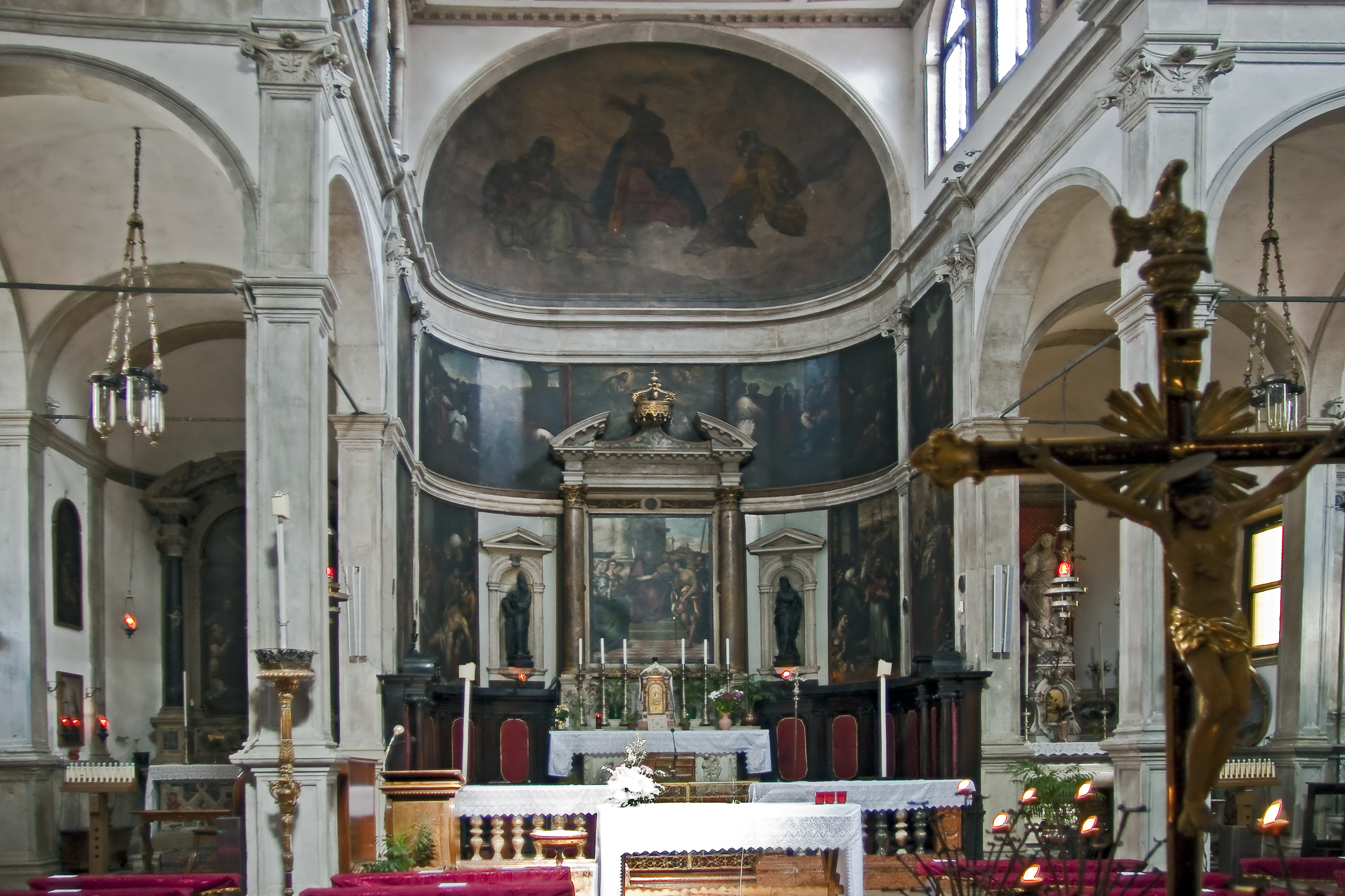
Internal view

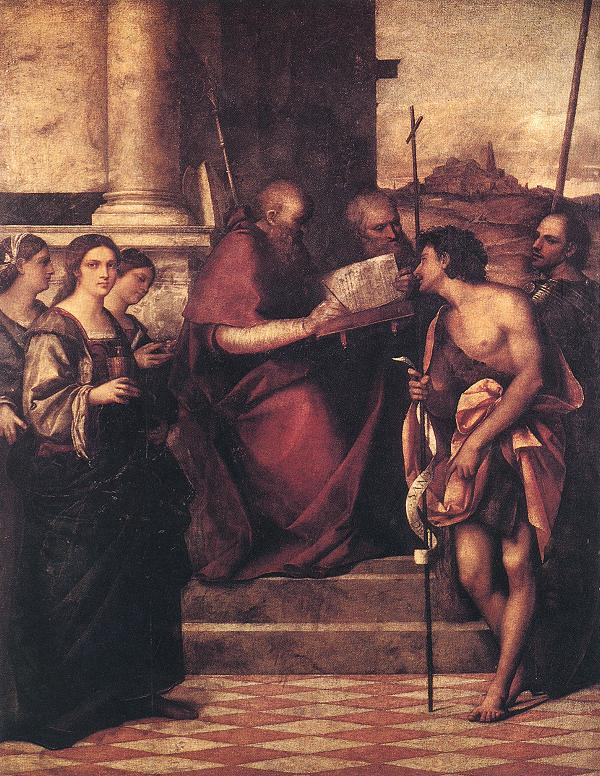
Altarpiece by Sebastiano del Piombo

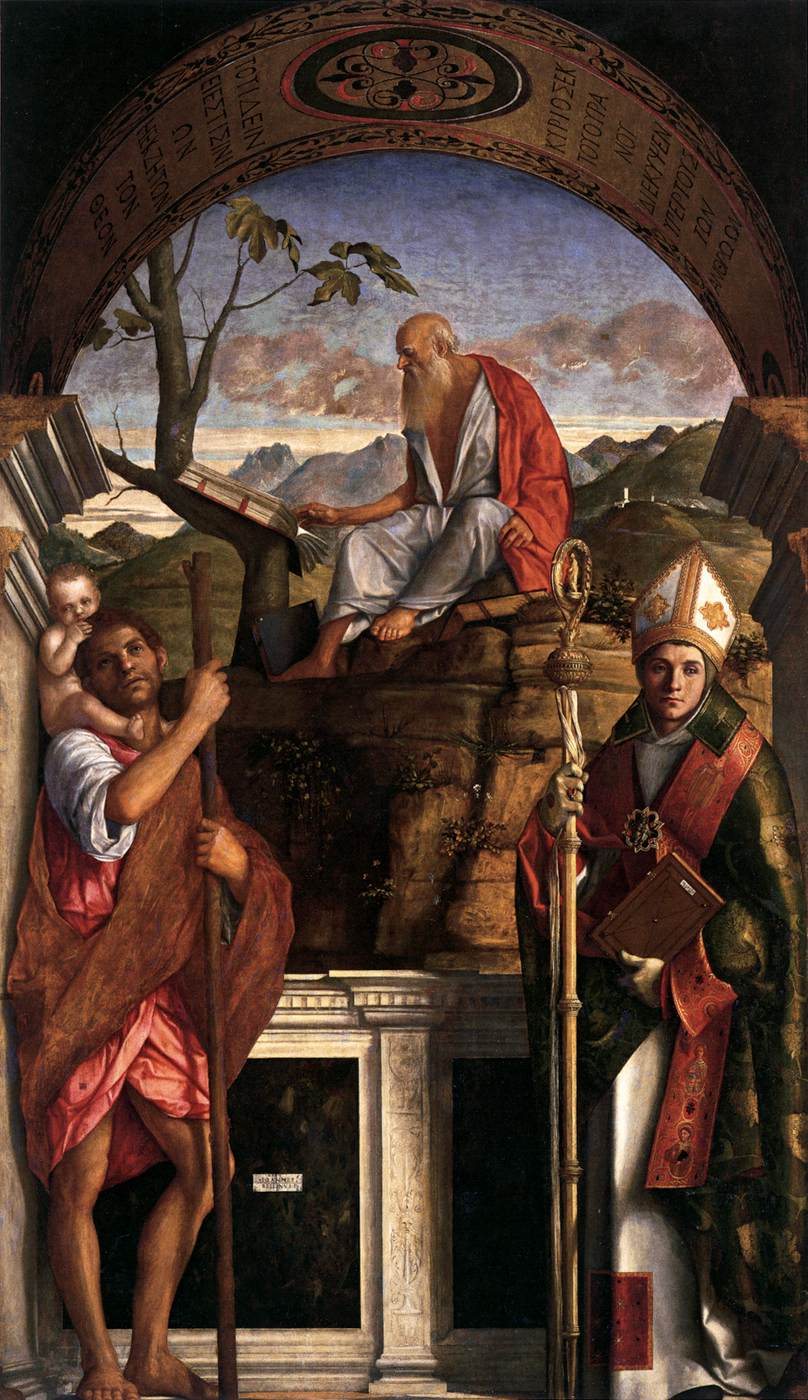
Bellini: Saints Christopher, Jerome and Louis of Toulouse

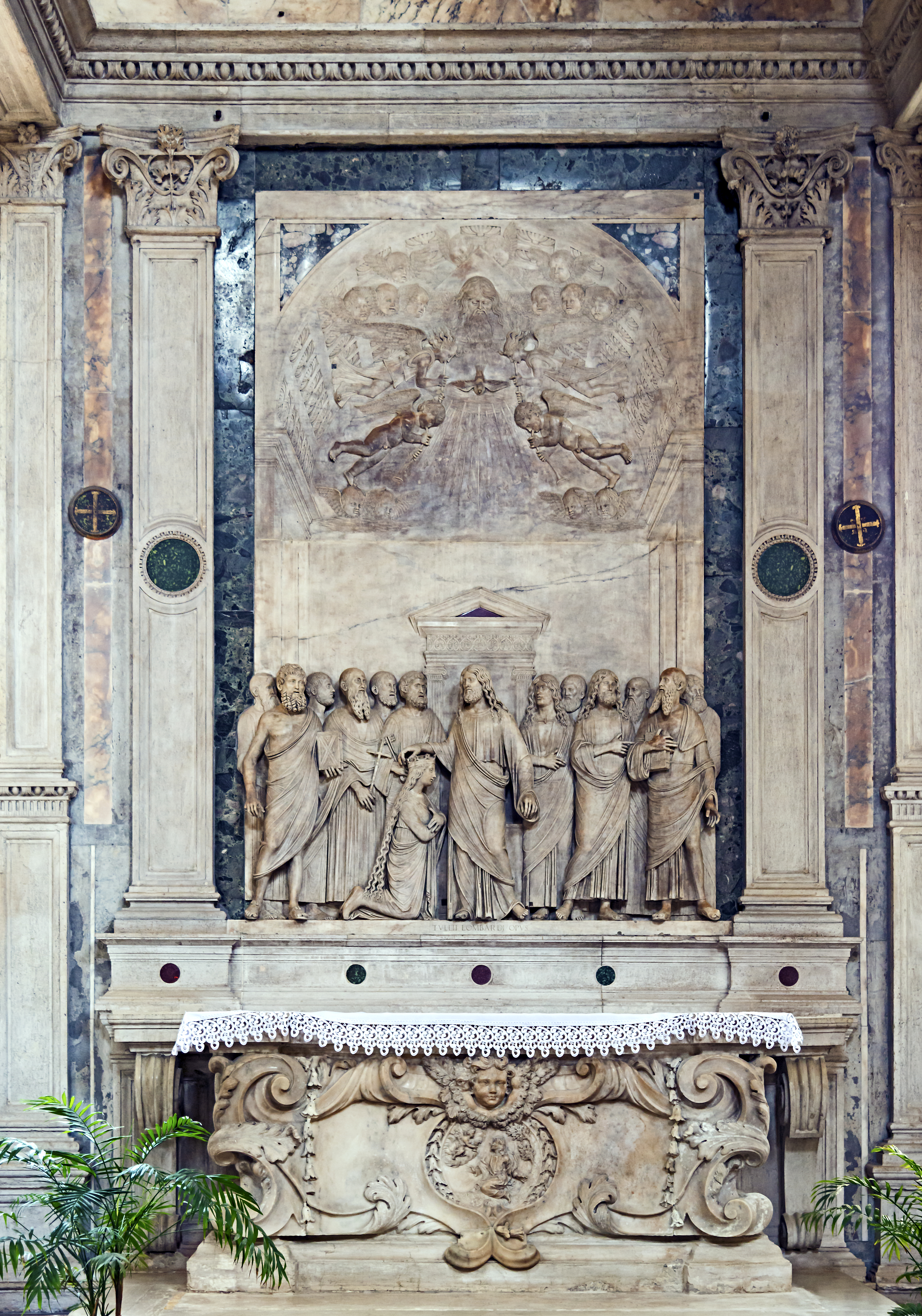
Coronation of the Virgin Tullio Lombardo

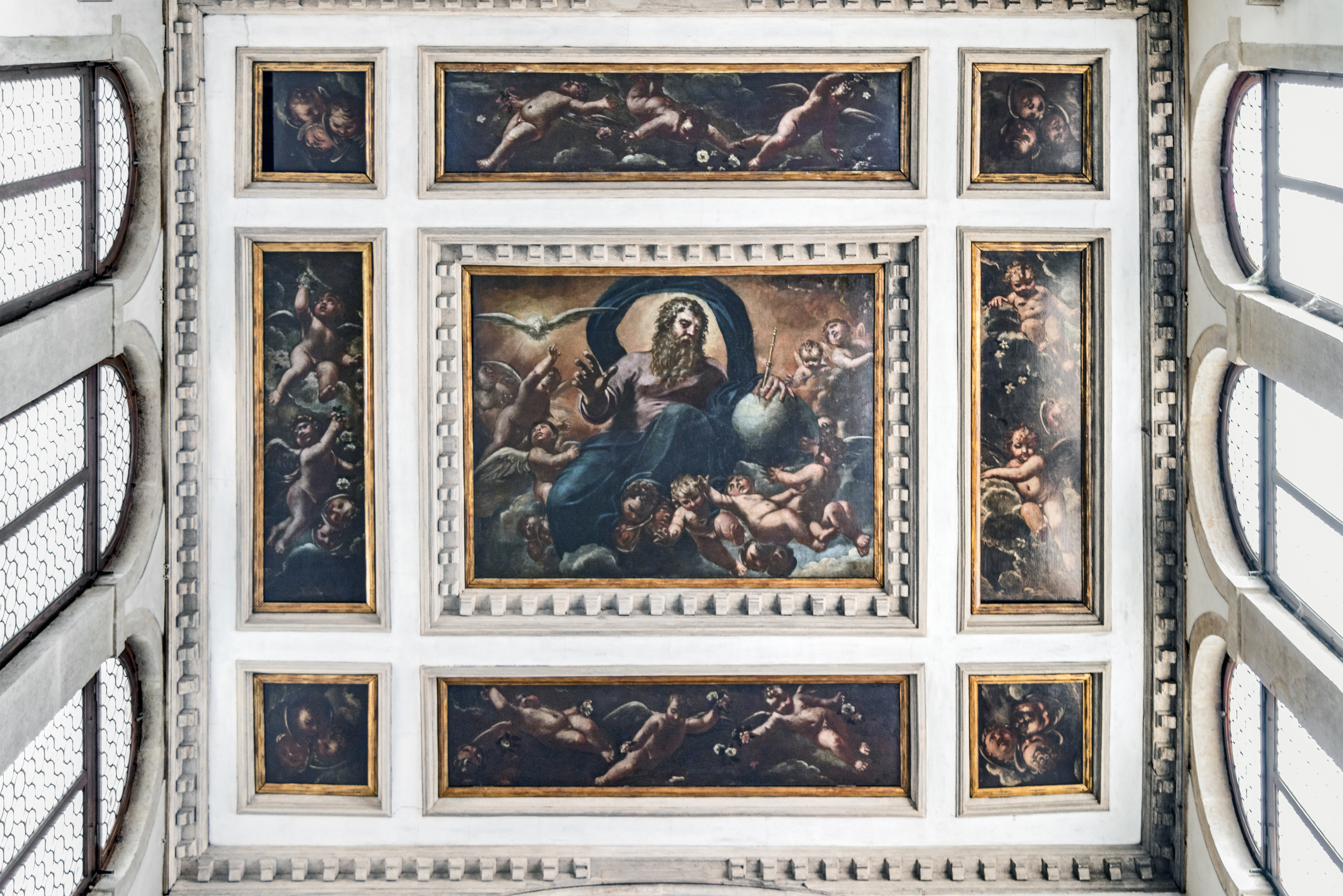
God the Father, fresco by Giuseppe Diamantini

== See also ==
- Late medieval domes
- Italian Renaissance domes
- 16th-century Western domes
