= Saint John Chrysostom Altarpiece =

Painting by Sebastiano del Piombo

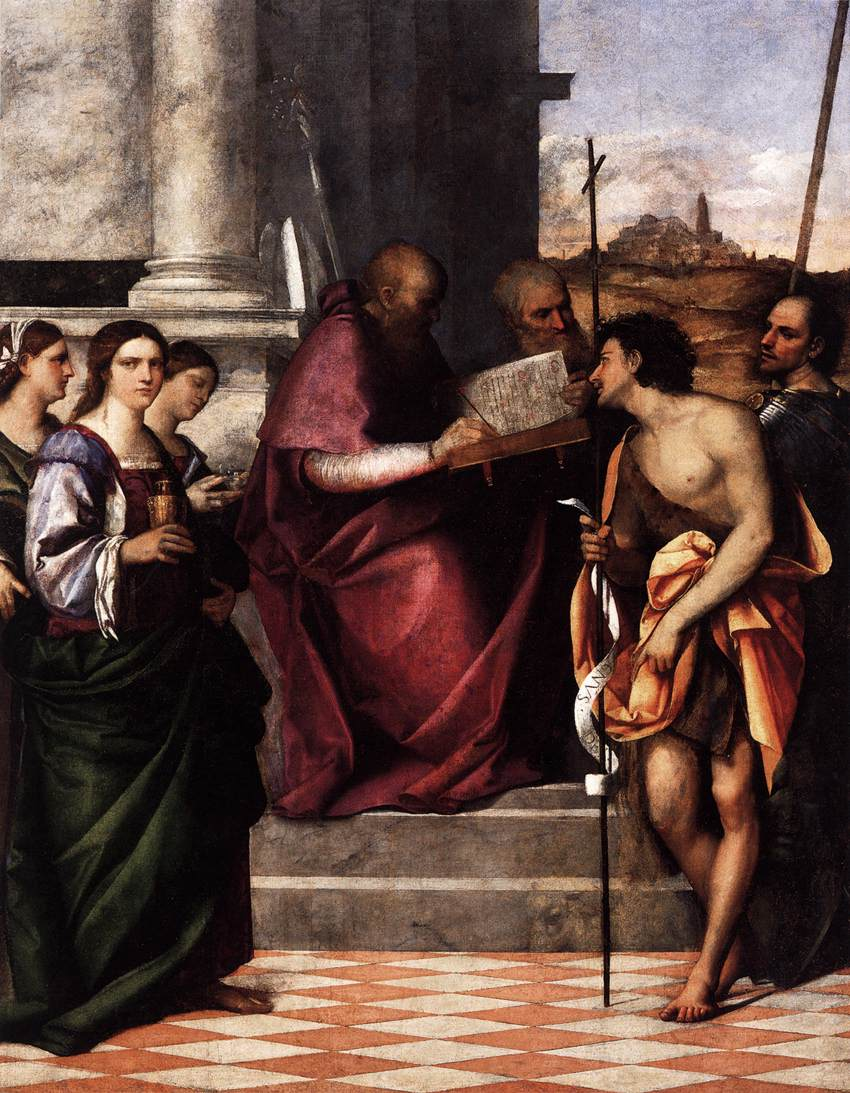
Saint John Chrysostom Altarpiece (c. 1510–1511) by Sebastiano del Piombo

The Saint John Chrysostom Altarpiece is an oil painting on canvas of 1510–1511 by Sebastiano del Piombo in the Venetian church of San Giovanni Grisostomo. It belongs to the sacra conversazione genre.

The painting was commissioned in the will of Caterina Contarini Morosini (dated 13 April 1509), to be produced after her husband Nicolò's death; he died in May 1510. The will did not mention the artist's name, though Vasari's 1550 Lives of the Artists attributed the painting in passing to Giorgione. However, he corrected this error in the 1568 edition of the work (Giorgione himself would not have had time to produce such a large work between Nicolò's death in May 1510 and his own death five months later), and attributed it to Sebastiano.

To the left are Saints Catherine of Alexandria, Mary Magdalene and Lucy and to the right are Saints John the Baptist and Liberale, while in the centre are seated Saints John Chrysostom and Nicholas of Bari. The model for Mary Magdalene is also to be found in Sebastiano's Salome with the Head of John the Baptist (London) and Woman as a Wise Virgin (Washington).
