= Salome with the Head of John the Baptist (Sebastiano del Piombo) =

Painting by Sebastiano del Piombo

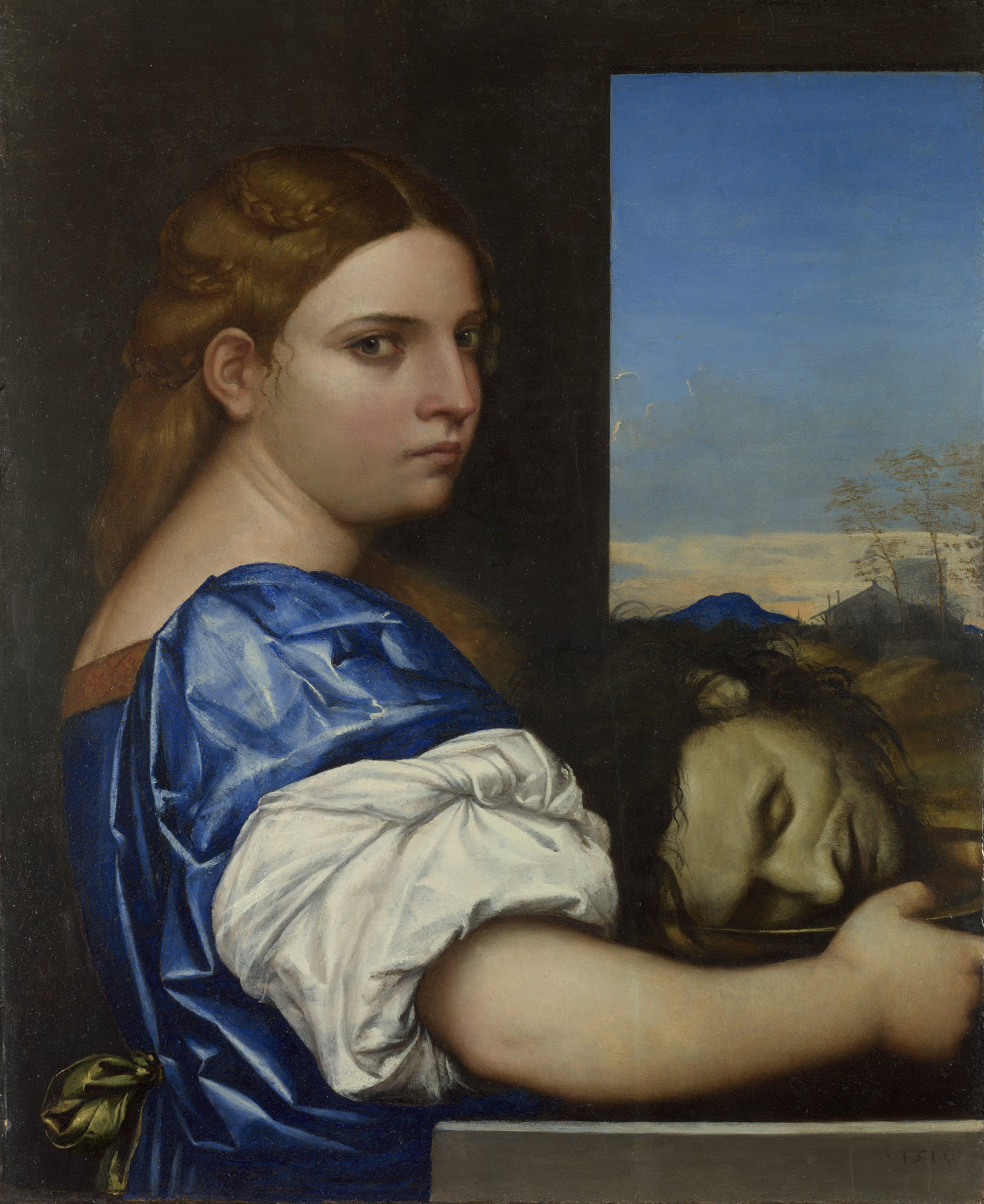
Salome with the Head of John the Baptist (c. 1510) by Sebastiano del Piombo

Salome with the Head of John the Baptist or The Daughter of Herodias is a circa 1510 oil on panel painting by Sebastiano del Piombo, now in the National Gallery, London, to which it was left by George Salting in 1910. The work could also show Judith with the head of Holofernes, though the presence of a vase is more likely to confirm it as Salome. The painting's model was also shown in the artist's St John Chrysostom Altarpiece as Mary Magdalene and in Woman as a Wise Virgin, both of a similar date.
