= Saints Christopher, Jerome and Louis of Toulouse =

Painting by Giovanni Bellini

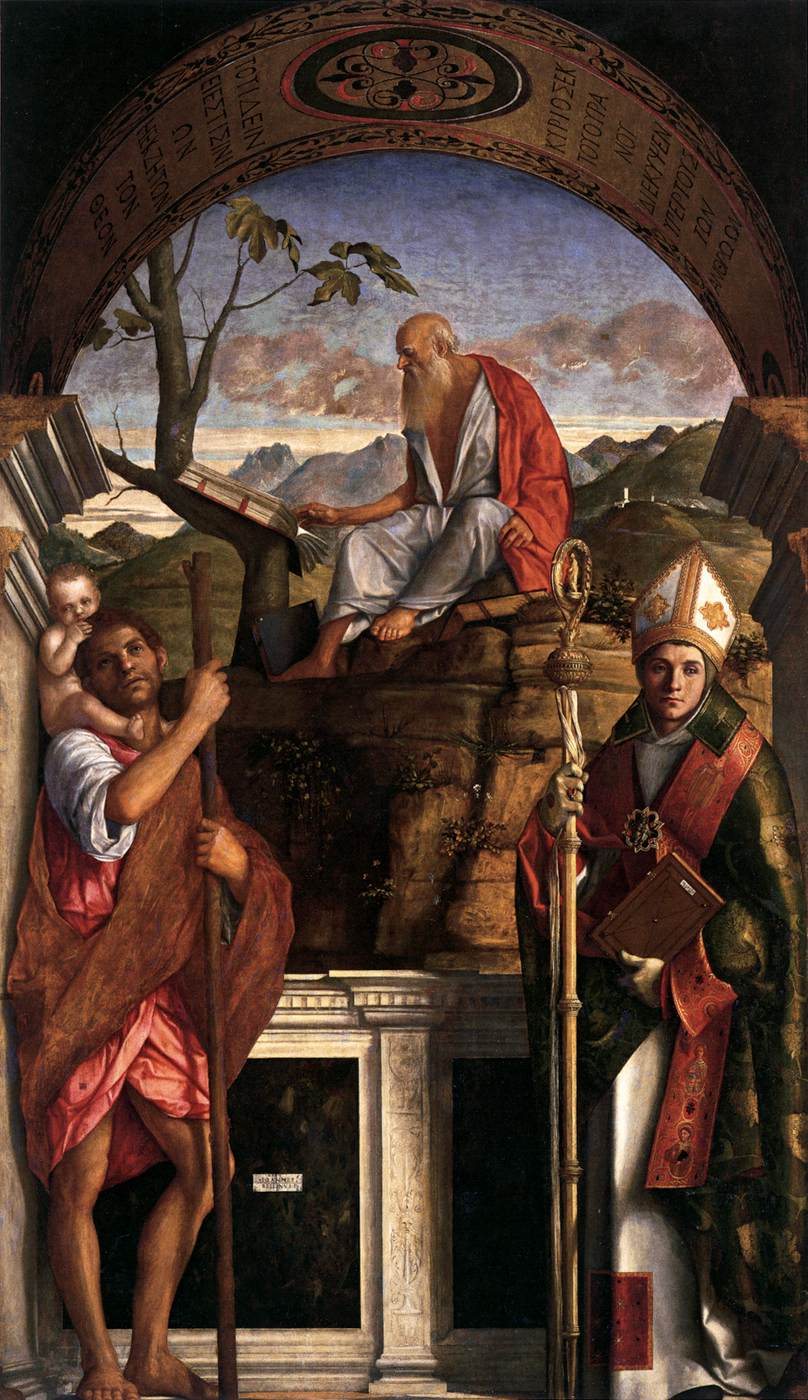
- Artist: Giovanni Bellini
- Year: 1513
- Medium: Oil on panel
- Dimensions: 300 cm × 185 cm (120 in × 73 in)
- Location: San Giovanni Crisostomo, Venice

Saints Christopher, Jerome and Louis of Toulouse is an oil-on-panel painting by the Italian Renaissance artist Giovanni Bellini, executed in 1513, and housed in the church of San Giovanni Crisostomo, Venice.

== History ==
The painting dates to Bellini's late career, when he had adopted Giorgione's tonalism. It had been commissioned in 1494 by the Venetian merchant Giorgio Diletti. It is however signed and dated 1513, but it is not known why there were some twenty years between the commissioning and the execution.

== Description ==
The layout is that of the Holy Conversation typical of the Venetian tradition, largely owed to works by Bellini himself, with an arch opening to a landscape in the background, and three figures of saints. Instead of the usual throne with the Virgin, there is St. Jerome, portrayed as a hermit, on a rock, while reading the Bible. Below, separated by a parapet where is the cartouche with the signature, are St. Christopher and a Saint bishop.

The latter had been originally identified as St. Augustine based on text on the book (De civitate Dei), which was later revealed to be apocryphal, as it is not placed on the front cover. Basing on the presence of lilies on the cloak, those of the House of Anjou, the character has been recognized as St. Louis of Toulouse.

The saints were perhaps chosen depending from Neoplatonic themes, with St. Louis symbolizing the contemplative and liturgic life, and St. Christopher symbolizing preaching. According to this view, Jerome would thus be the highest point of spiritual life. The arch above him is a symbol of the Catholic church, and has a Greek inscription of the Psalm 14, referring to St. Jerome as the sage mentioned in it. The use of Greek derives from San Crisostomo's role as church of the Greek-speaking Venetians.

== See also ==
- List of works by Giovanni Bellini

== Sources ==
- Olivari, Mariolina (2004). "Giovanni Bellini". Pittori del Rinascimento (in Italian). Florence: Scala.
