= Portrait of Andrea Doria (Sebastiano del Piombo) =

Painting by Sebastiano del Piombo

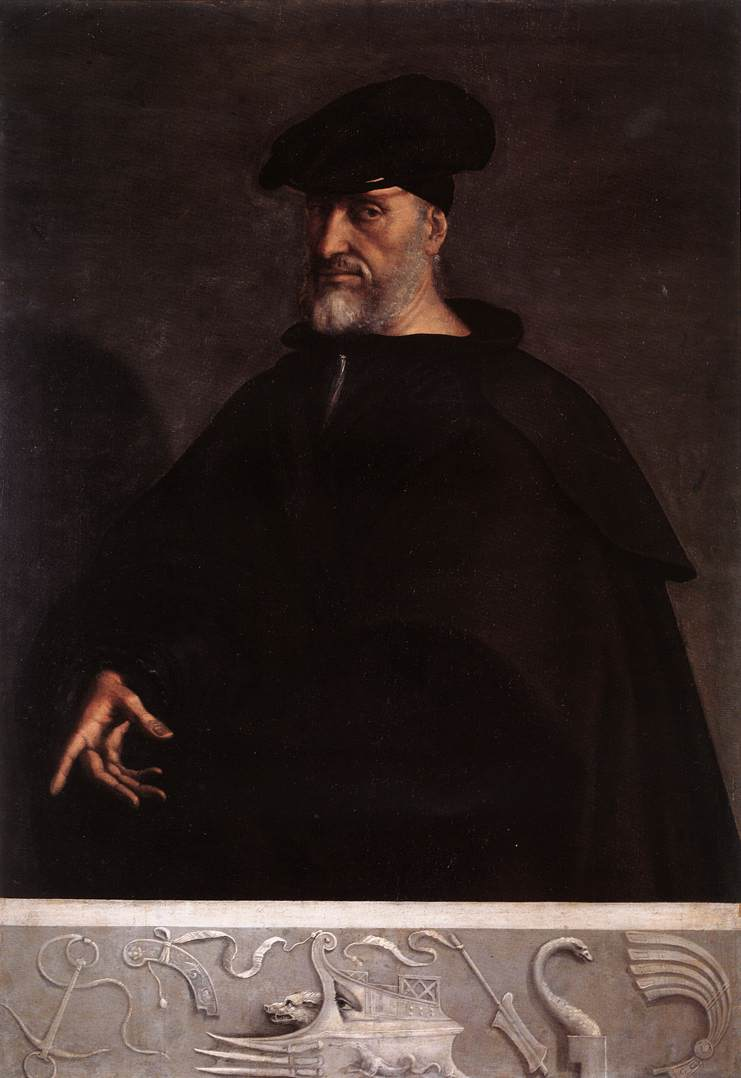
- Artist: Sebastiano Del Piombo
- Year: c. 1526
- Medium: Oil on panel
- Dimensions: 153 cm × 107 cm (60 in × 42 in)
- Location: Doria Pamphilj Gallery, Rome

The Portrait of Andrea Doria is a painting finished c. 1526 by the Italian High Renaissance painter Sebastiano Del Piombo. It was painted after Sebastiano had fully mastered his Roman style. The painting depicts Andrea Doria, a famed naval commander from Genoa. Doria had rescued the city from French control and was made a prince as a reward. The naval symbols on the relief at the bottom of the painting emphasize Doria's rank of Admiral. The imitation antique relief at the bottom of the painting was likely included at the wishes of the patron.

It is housed in the Doria Pamphilj Gallery of Genoa.
