= Saint Dorothy (painting) =

Painting by Sebastiano del Piombo

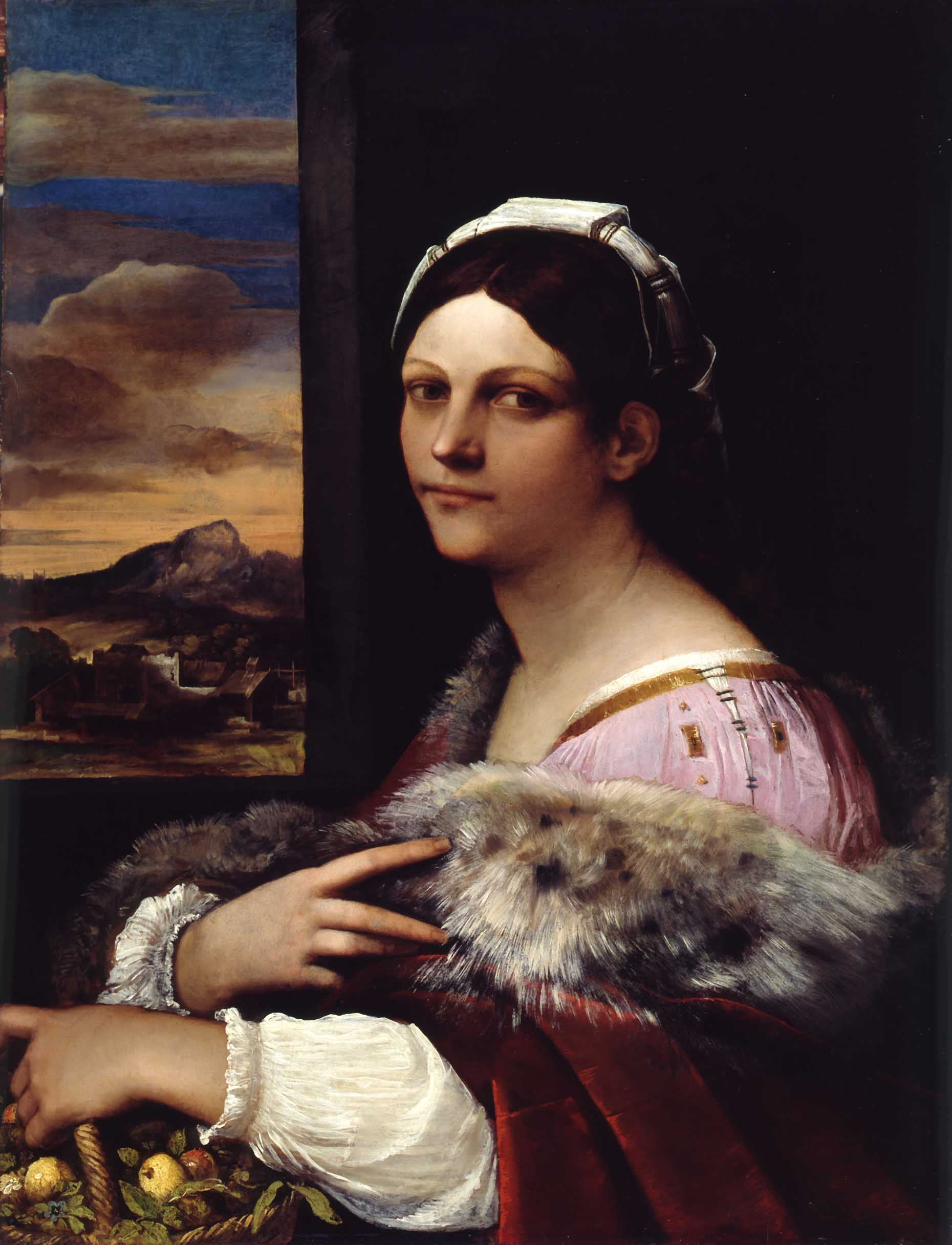
Saint Dorothy (c. 1512) by Sebastiano del Piombo

Saint Dorothy (Italian; La Dorotea) or Young Roman Woman with a Fruit Basket is a circa 1512 oil on panel painting by Sebastiano del Piombo, now in the Gemäldegalerie, Berlin. A basket is an attribute of saint Dorothy, hence its first title.

It was painted during the artist's stay in Rome after he was summoned there in August 1511 to take part in Agostino Chigi's decoration of the Villa Farnesina. Long misattributed to Raphael, its correct attribution was revived on 16 July 1835 by the art historian Gustav Friedrich Waagen, the Gemäldegalerie's first curator.

== Bibliography ==
- David Alan Brown e.a., Bellini, Giorgione, Titian, and the Renaissance of Venetian Painting (catalogue of the exhibition at the National Gallery of Art, Washington, 18.06-17.09.2006 and the Kunsthistorisches Museum, Vienna 17.10.2006-07.01.2007), New Haven, Yale University Press, 2006 ISBN 978-0300116779
- (in Italian) Claudio Strinati and Bernd W. Lindemannnel (editors), Sebastiano del Piombo (1485-1547).(catalogue of the exhibition in Rome, 8 February - 18 May 2008 and Berlin, 28 June-28 September 2008), Milano, Federico Motta, 2008 ISBN 978-88-7179-576-8
