= Sebastiano del Piombo =

Italian painter (c. 1485 – 1547)

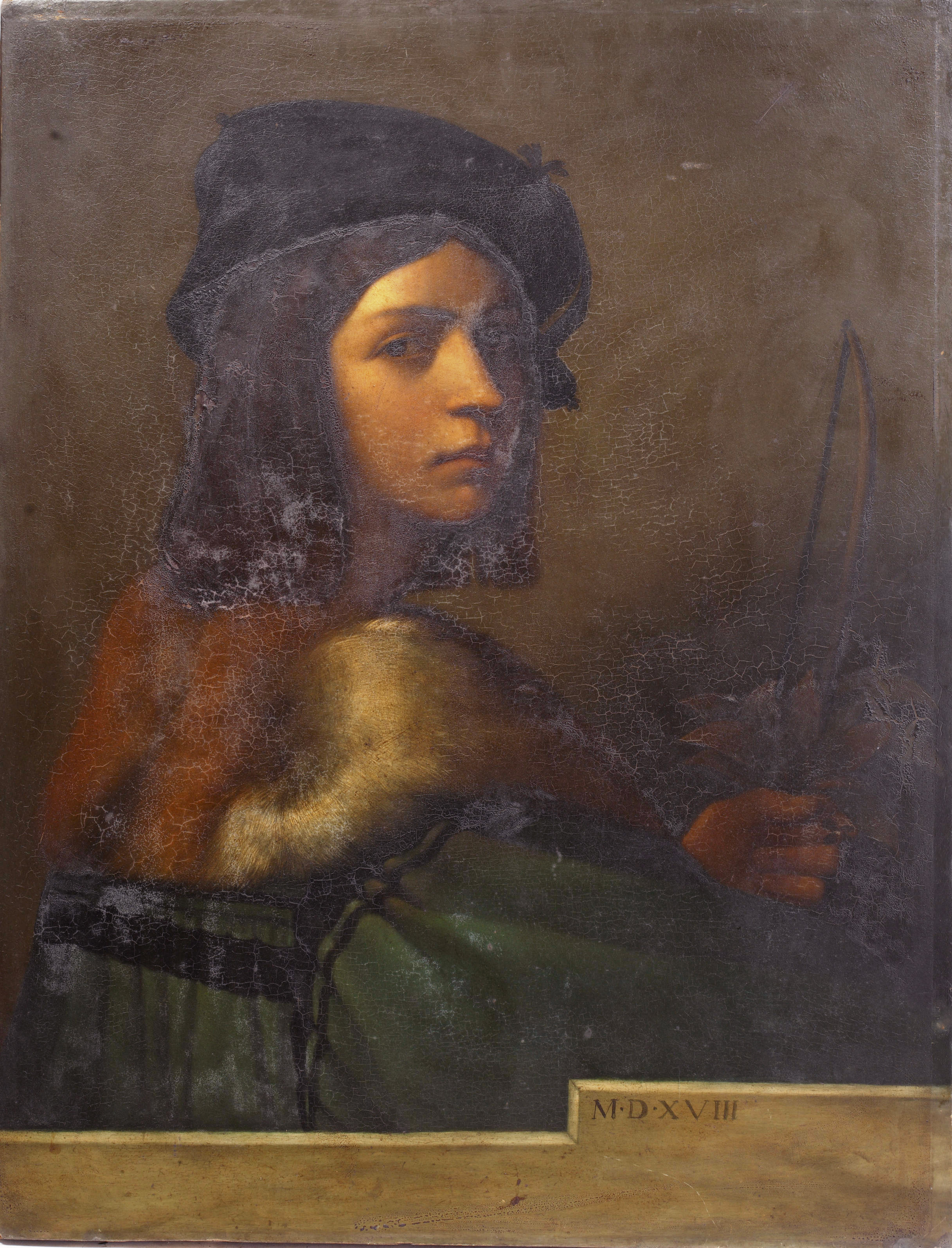
- Copy of The Violinist, sometimes claimed to be a self portrait
- Born: Sebastiano Luciani c. 1485; Probably Venice, Italy
- Died: 21 June 1547 (aged 61–62); Rome, Papal States
- Education: Giovanni Bellini, probably Giorgione
- Known for: Painting
- Movement: High Renaissance

Sebastiano del Piombo (Italian: [sebaˈstjaːno del ˈpjombo]; c. 1485 – 21 June 1547) was an Italian painter of the High Renaissance and early Mannerist periods, famous as the only major artist of the period to combine the colouring of the Venetian school in which he was trained with the monumental forms of the Roman school. He belongs both to the painting school of his native city, Venice, where he made significant contributions before he left for Rome in 1511, and that of Rome, where he stayed for the rest of his life, and whose style he thoroughly adopted.

Born Sebastiano Luciani, after coming to Rome he became known as Sebastiano Veneziano or Viniziano ("Sebastian the Venetian"), until in 1531 he became the Keeper of the Seal to the Papacy, and so got the nickname del Piombo ("of the Lead") thereafter, from his new job title of piombatore. Friends like Michelangelo and Ariosto called him Fra Bastiano ("Brother Bastian").

Never a very disciplined or productive painter, his artistic productivity fell still further after becoming piombatore, which committed him to attend on the pope most days, to travel with him and to take holy orders as a friar, despite having a wife and two children. He now painted mostly portraits, and relatively few works of his survive compared to his great contemporaries in Rome. This limited his involvement with the Mannerist style of his later years.

Having achieved success as a lutenist in Venice when young, he turned to painting and trained with Giovanni Bellini and Giorgione. When he first went to Rome, he worked alongside Raphael and then became one of the few painters to get on well with Michelangelo, who tried to promote his career by encouraging him to compete for commissions against Raphael. He painted portraits and religious subjects in oils, and, once he was established, avoided the large fresco schemes that took up so much of the time of Raphael and Michelangelo. His earlier career in both Venice and Rome was somewhat overshadowed by the presence of clearly greater painters in the same city, but after the death of Raphael in 1520, he became Rome's leading painter. His influence on other artists was limited by his lack of prominent pupils and relatively little dissemination of his works in print copies.

== Venice ==
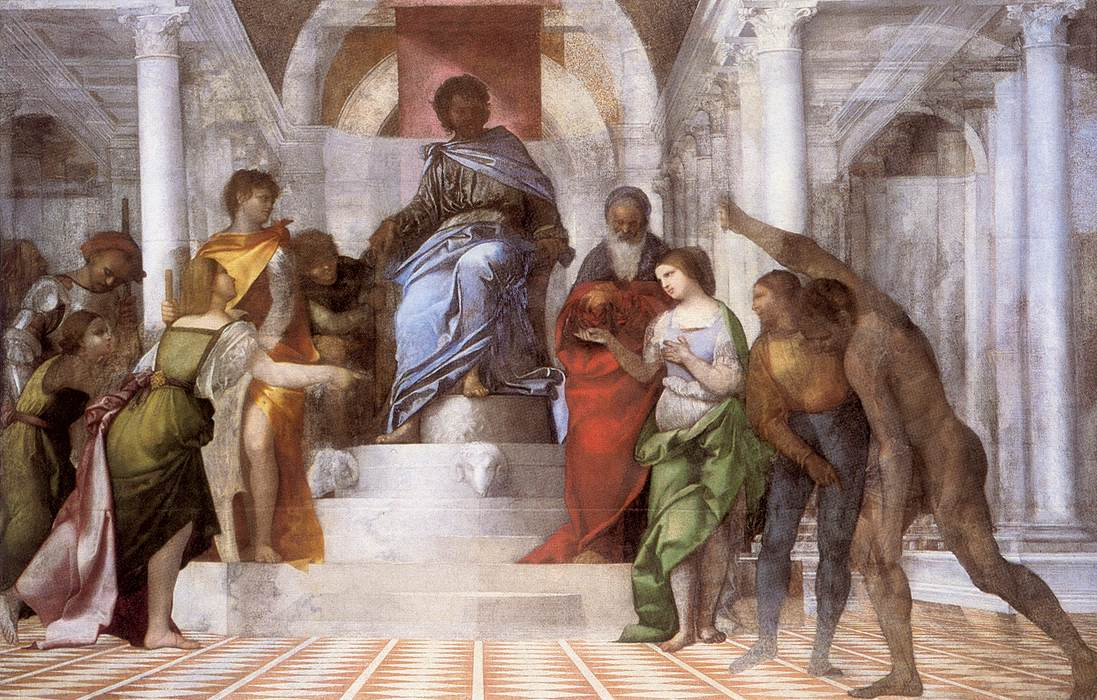
The Judgment of Solomon, 1508–1510, now usually attributed to Sebastiano.

Sebastiano del Piombo was probably born in Venice, though there is no certainty as to his background. His birthdate is extrapolated from Vasari's statement that he was 62 at his death in 1547. That he was first known as a musician and singer may suggest an upper-middle-class background; the extent to which his playing on the lute and other instruments was professional is unclear. Like his contemporary Raphael, his career was marked by his ability to get on well with both other artists and patrons. He began to train as a painter at a relatively late age, probably 18 or 20, so around 1503–1505, becoming a pupil of Giovanni Bellini and probably afterwards of Giorgione, both of whose influence is apparent in his works; Vasari's mention of their relationship is rather vague: "si acconciò con Giorgione".

No signed or firmly documented works survive from his period painting in Venice, and many attributions are disputed. As with other artists, some of Sebastiano's works have long been confused with Giorgione's. Like Titian, he may have completed work left unfinished at Giorgione's death in 1510; Marcantonio Michiel says he finished The Three Philosophers. The earliest significant work attributed to him is a portrait of a girl in Budapest, of about 1505.

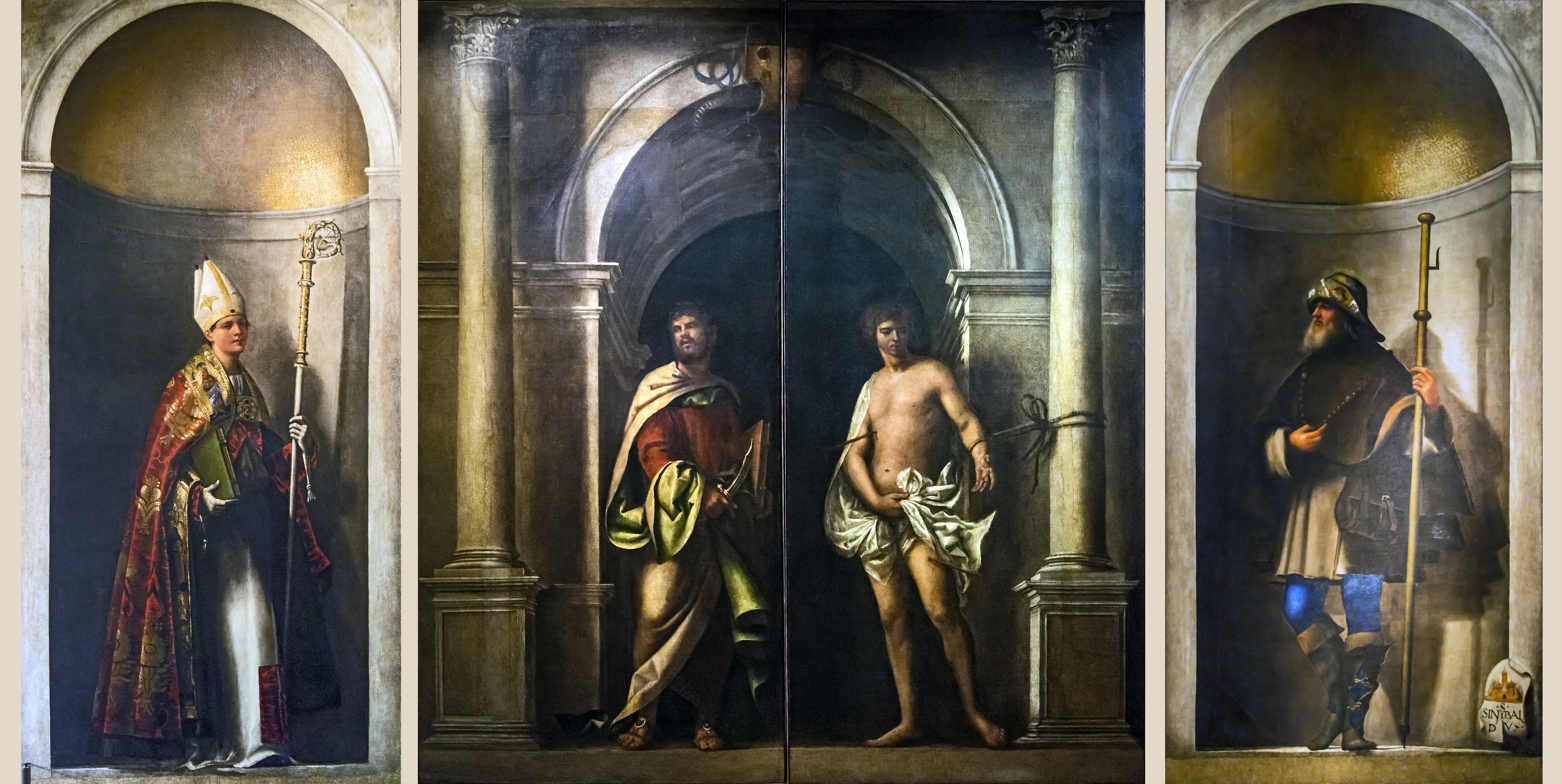
Organ-shutters of San Bartolomeo, Venice, now displayed with outside pair at centre.

He is now usually assigned the unfinished and reworked Judgement of Solomon now at Kingston Lacy. This dramatic and imposing picture, "one of the masterpieces of Venetian narrative painting", was also long attributed to Giorgione; it may have been abandoned about 1508, though the estimated dates vary in the period 1505–1510. After extensive restoration in the 1980s, removing later overpainting, the painting is now left with traces of the three different compositions visible; still more can be seen with infra-red reflectography. Still over 2 × 3 metres, it seems originally to have been even larger, with some 40 cm lost along the left edge. There are two versions of the elaborate architectural background, which was a recurrent interest of Sebastiano's Venetian period. The last setting is in a basilica, which may reflect a "more learned" picture intended for a building holding courts of justice. The figure at the front of the executioner, left without clothes or the baby, is clearly drawn from classical sculpture.

Four standing figures of saints in niches on the organ-shutters of San Bartolomeo, Venice, now in the Gallerie dell'Accademia in Venice, date from c. 1508–1509, and are "very Giorgionesque", especially the pair on the insides. They were painted at the same time as Giorgione's frescos for the Fondaco dei Tedeschi (now lost) just by the church, which was the German's church in Venice, and at this time also held Albrecht Dürer's Madonna of the Rose-Garlands of 1506. The outside pair of shutters also show what Sebastiano had learnt from Bellini. Their technique has developed "from the earlier smooth surface to the application of paint in heavy brushstrokes", and the figure of Saint Sebastian shows awareness of classical sculpture.

The main altarpiece for San Giovanni Crisostomo, Venice of 1510–1511 shows the patron saint, Saint John Chrysostom reading aloud at a desk, a Mary Magdalene looking out at the viewer, and two other female and three male saints. The organ-shutters for the church were also painted. The style shows developments "towards a new fullness of form and breadth of movement" that may have been influenced by the Florentine painter Fra Bartolommeo, who was in Venice in 1508. Aspects of the composition were also innovative, and later copied by Venetian painters, including even Titian.

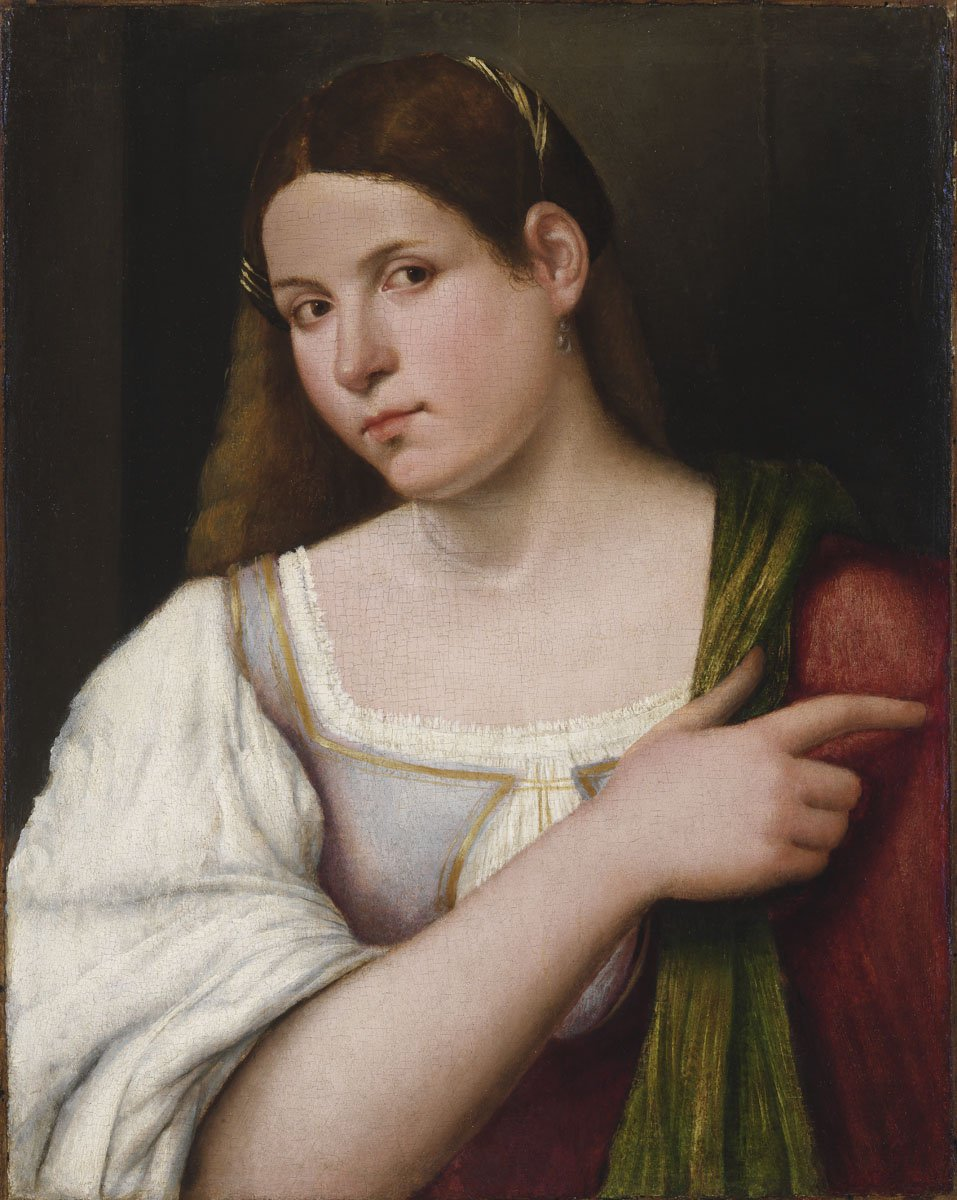
Portrait of a Girl in Budapest, c. 1505, one of his earliest paintings.

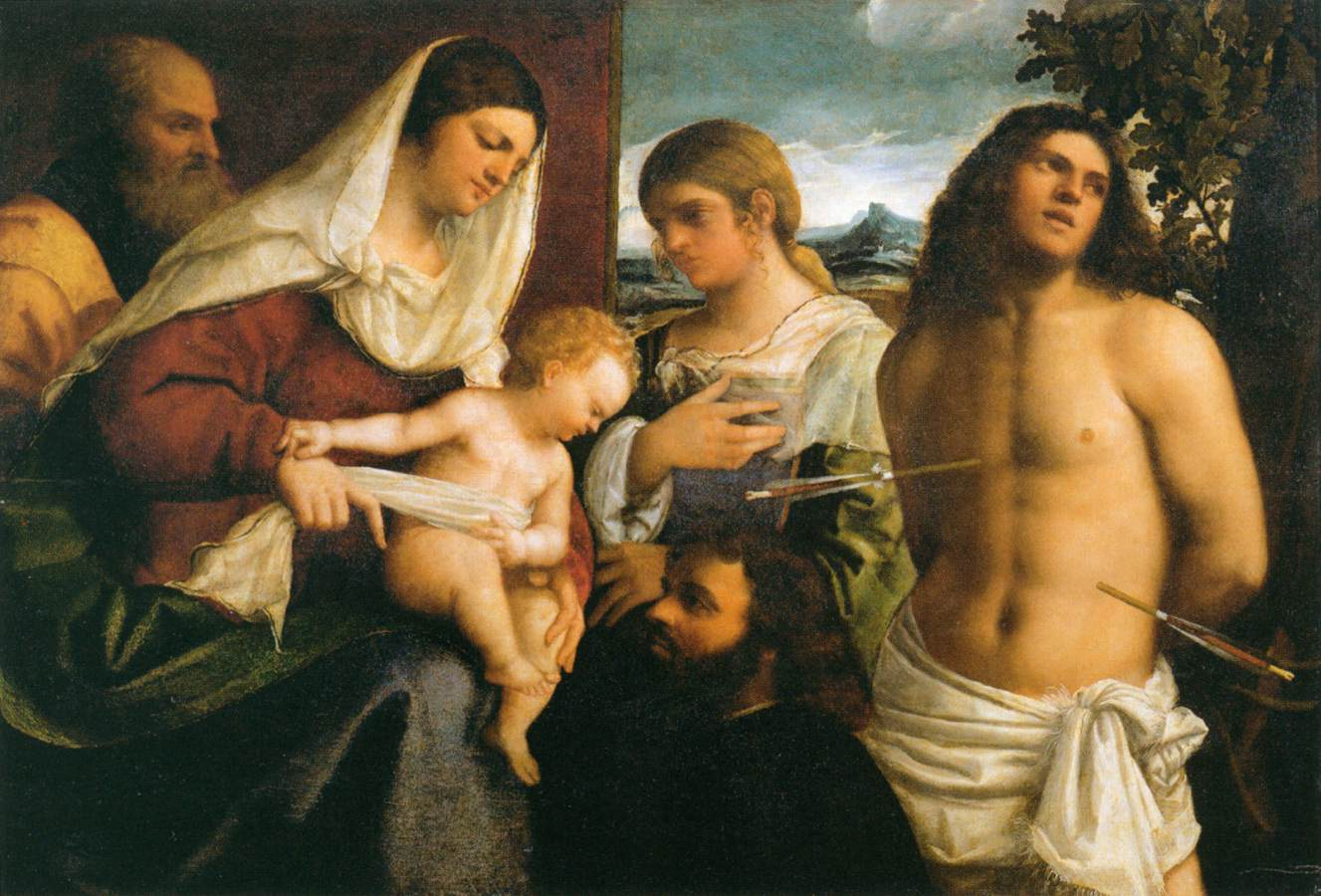
Sacra conversatione, c. 1507, Louvre

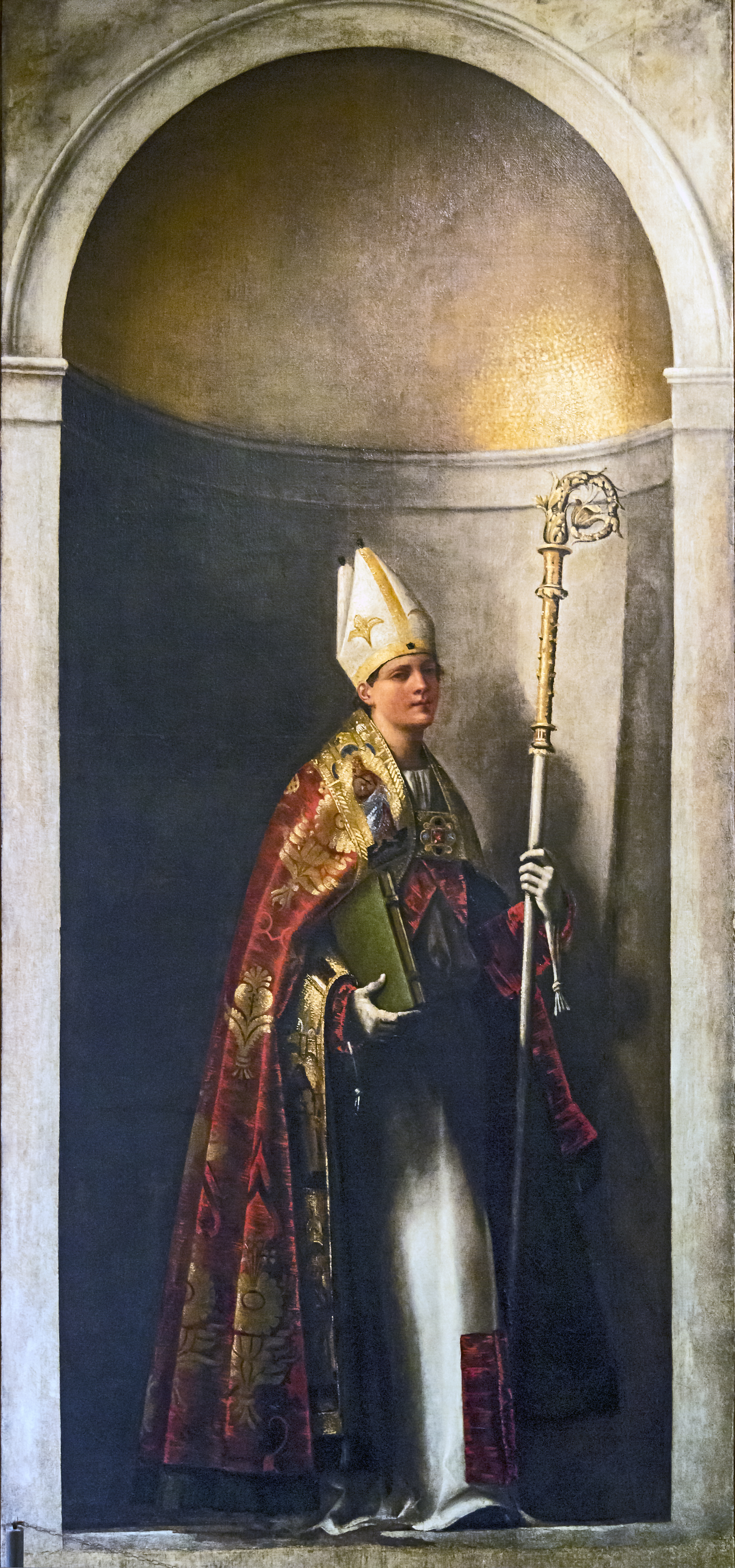
Saint Louis of Toulouse, from the inside of the organ-shutters of San Bartolomeo, Venice.

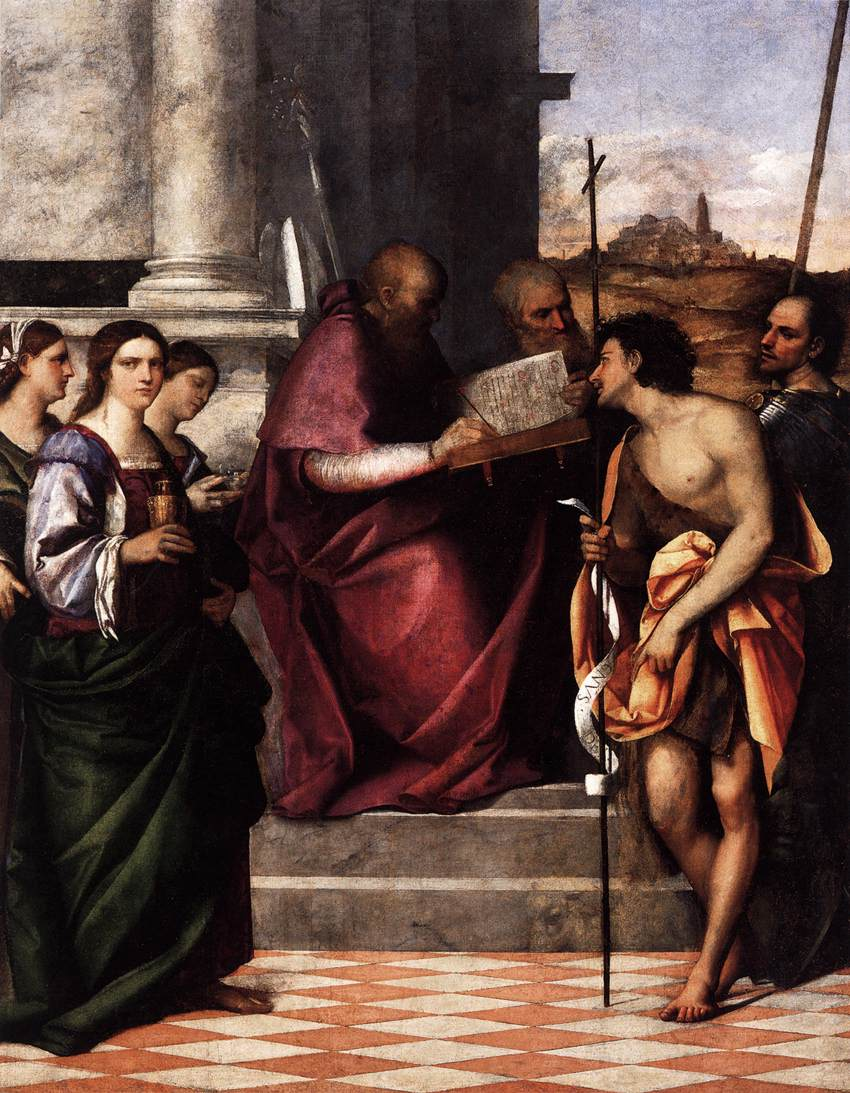
Altarpiece at San Giovanni Crisostomo, Venice, 1510–11

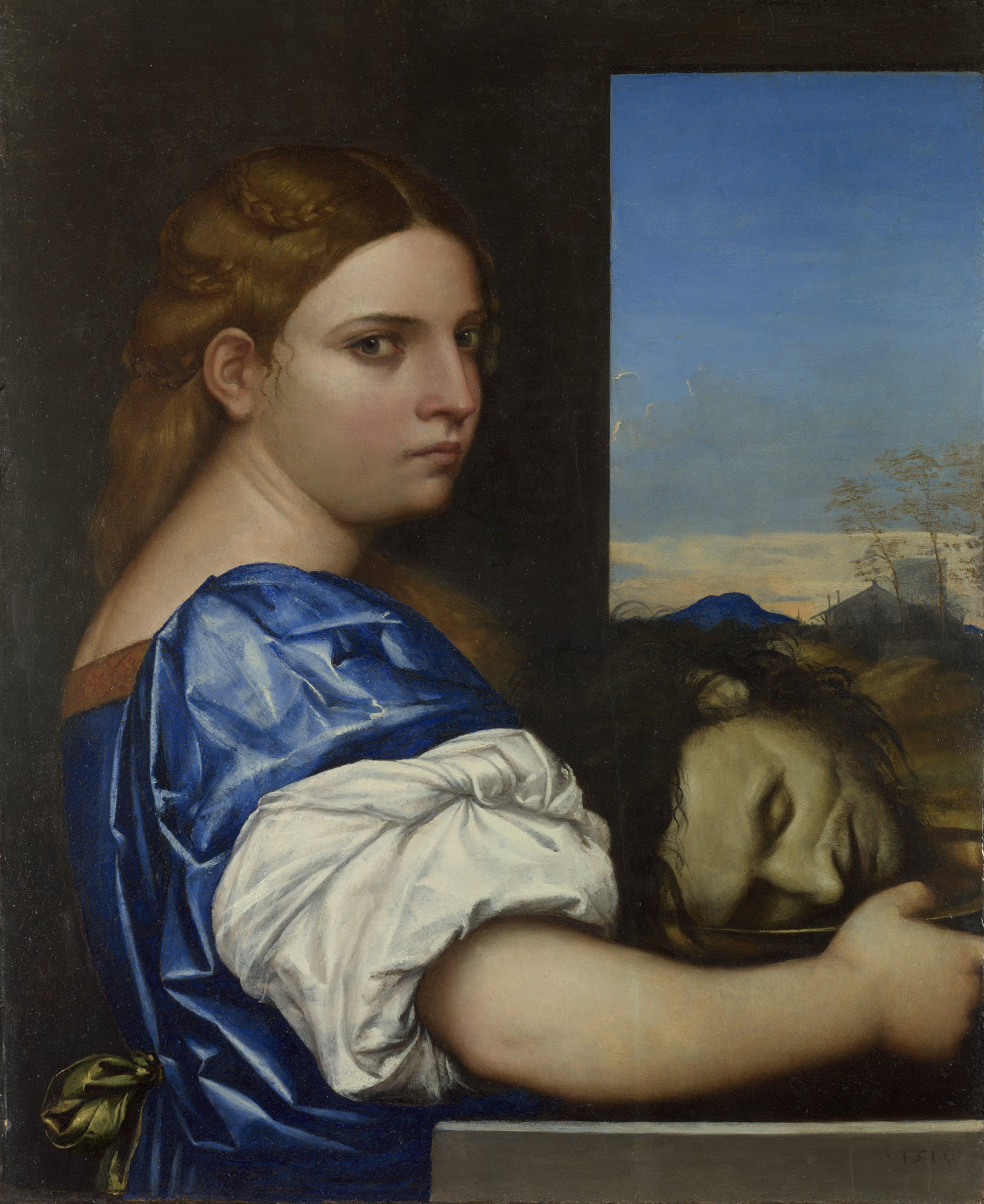
Salome, or Judith, 1510

== Rome ==
=== 1511–1520 ===
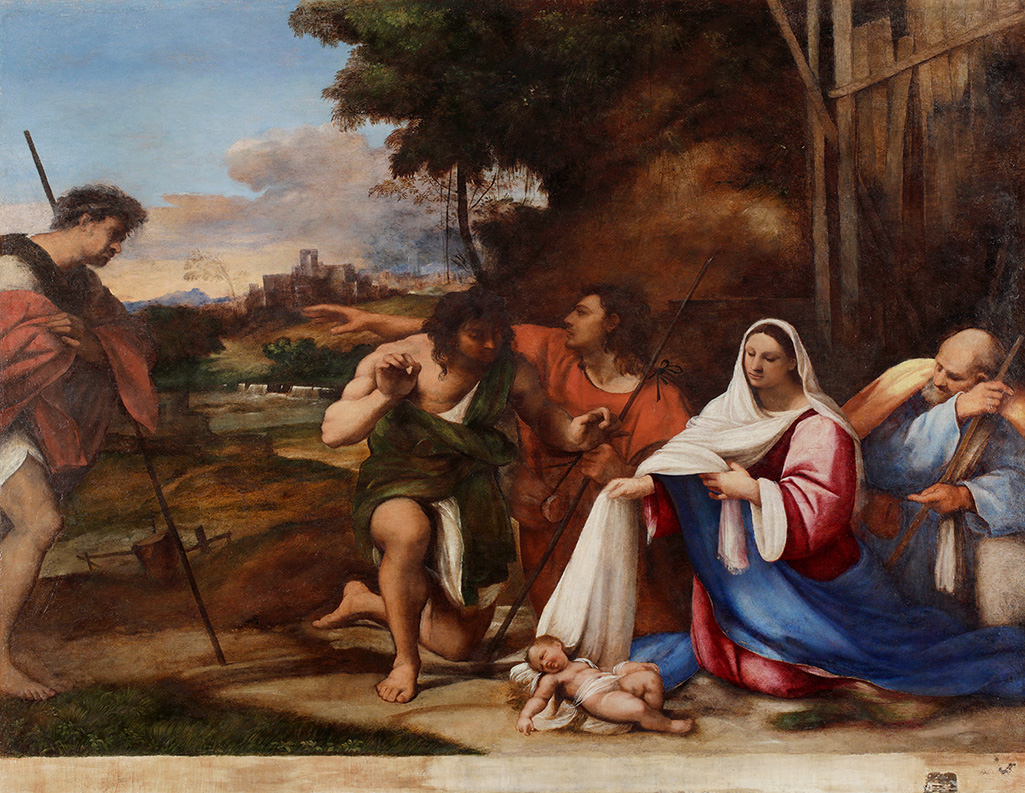
Adoration of the Shepherds, 1511–12, Fitzwilliam Museum, perhaps Sebastiano's first Roman easel painting.

In 1511 the Papal banker Agostino Chigi was the richest man in Rome, and a generous patron of the arts. Early in the year he was sent to Venice by Pope Julius II to buy Venetian support for the papacy in the War of the League of Cambrai. When he returned to Rome after a stay of some six months, he brought Sebastiano with him; Sebastiano was to remain based in Rome for the rest of his life. Sebastiano began by painting mythological subjects in lunettes in the Sala di Galatea in Chigi's Villa Farnesina, under a ceiling just done by Baldassarre Peruzzi. In these he already shows an adaption to Roman style, especially that of Michelangelo, whose Sistine Chapel ceiling had just been completed. Probably the next year, he added a large Polyphemus. It is possible that Raphael's famous Galatea of 1514, which is in the next bay and now dominates the room, replaced a fresco by Sebastiano. A larger cycle on the lower walls was apparently intended, but abandoned, for reasons that are not clear.

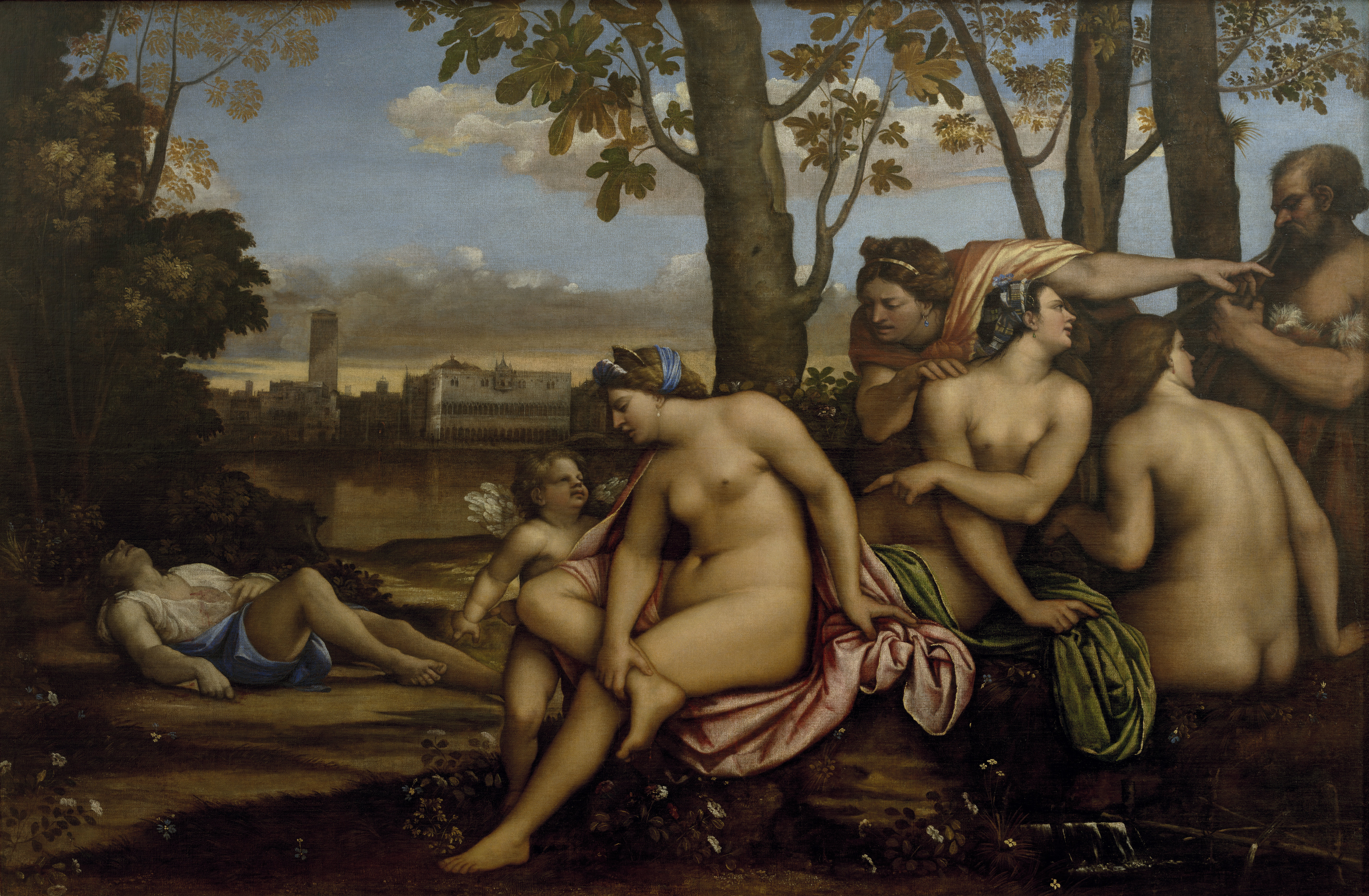
Death of Adonis, Uffizi, c. 1512–13

Sebastiano had also been producing easel paintings from soon after his arrival, showing the development of his new style. A Death of Adonis in the Uffizi dates to about 1512–13, and shows that he "had achieved a working dialectic of Roman and Venetian classical styles", in which he "enlarged the proportion of his figures into an almost bulking massiveness, ponderous and sensuously splendid: idealizations, but of sensuous existence".

By about 1515, Sebastiano had befriended and allied himself with Michelangelo, who recruited him "as a kind of deputy for him in painting", he having returned to his backlog of promised projects in sculpture. Michelangelo's intention was for Sebastiano to "contest Raphael's first place" in painting in Rome, using at least in part ideas and designs supplied by Michelangelo, whose rivalry with Raphael had become intense. The intention may have been for a closer relationship than actually resulted, as in 1516 Michelangelo returned to Florence, only returning occasionally to Rome for several years after.

The first result of this collaboration was one of Sebastiano's most important paintings, a Pietà in Viterbo. Here the composition is highly unusual for this common subject (which Michelangelo had famously sculpted in 1498–99), with Christ lying across the bottom of the picture space, at the feet of a Virgin looking up to Heaven, so that the two figures do not actually touch. Though no drawing survives, this was Michelangelo's conception, where "an idea of high tragic power is expressed with extreme simplicity in a structure of severe geometric rigour". The back of the panels have large sketches in charcoal that seem to be by both artists. In 1516 he painted a similar subject, the Lamentation of Jesus (now Hermitage Museum) using his own composition, and showing his awareness of Raphael's handling of groups of figures.

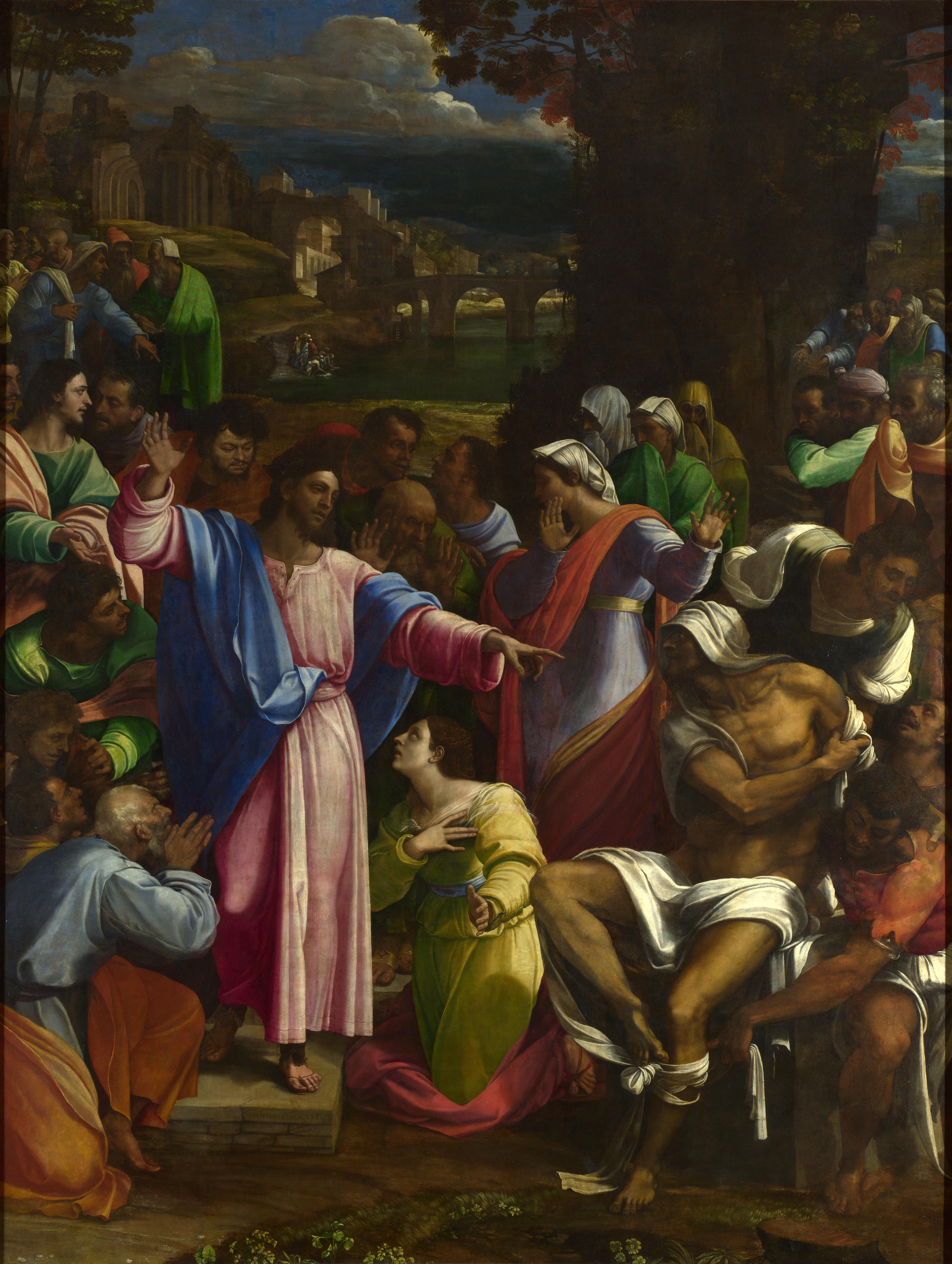
The Raising of Lazarus (1517–1519)

These led a Florentine friend of Michelangelo, Pierfrancesco Borgherini, to commission Sebastiano to decorate a chapel in San Pietro in Montorio in Rome; he no doubt hoped to get significant input from Michelangelo. There is a Michelangelo drawing of 1516 for the Flagellation of Jesus in the British Museum, and other sketches; the final design survives only in a copy by Giulio Clovio after another Michelangelo drawing (Royal Collection). In the event there were a series of interruptions and Sebastiano did not complete the chapel until early 1524. The Flagellation is painted in oil on plaster. This was a method first practiced by Domenico Veneziano, and afterwards by other artists; but according to Vasari only Sebastiano succeeded in preventing the colours eventually blackening.

The last major work of the period was the Raising of Lazarus, now in the National Gallery, London, which was commissioned in 1516 by Cardinal Giulio de Medici, archbishop of Narbonne in southern France, and the future Pope Clement VII, in blatant competition, engineered by Michelangelo, with a painting of the same size by Raphael, the Transfiguration. Both were supposed to hang in Narbonne Cathedral. Michelangelo supplied at least drawings for the figure of Lazarus and the two men supporting him (British Museum), but probably did not do any work on the painting itself, if only because he was only briefly in Rome during the time it was painted. When the two paintings were hung together in the Vatican, just after Raphael's death in 1520, both were praised, but the Raphael generally preferred, as has remained the case ever since.

In the early 1520s Sebastiano completed the Borgherini Chapel with a Transfiguration in the semi-dome above his Flagellation. The combination shows the influence of the Apocalipsis Nova, a contemporary text that prophesied the coming of an "Angelic Pastor" who would bring a new age of peace. Michelangelo was among many reformist Catholics interested in the text. The Flagellation represents "the current, corrupted state of Christianity and the Transfiguration the glorious future to come".

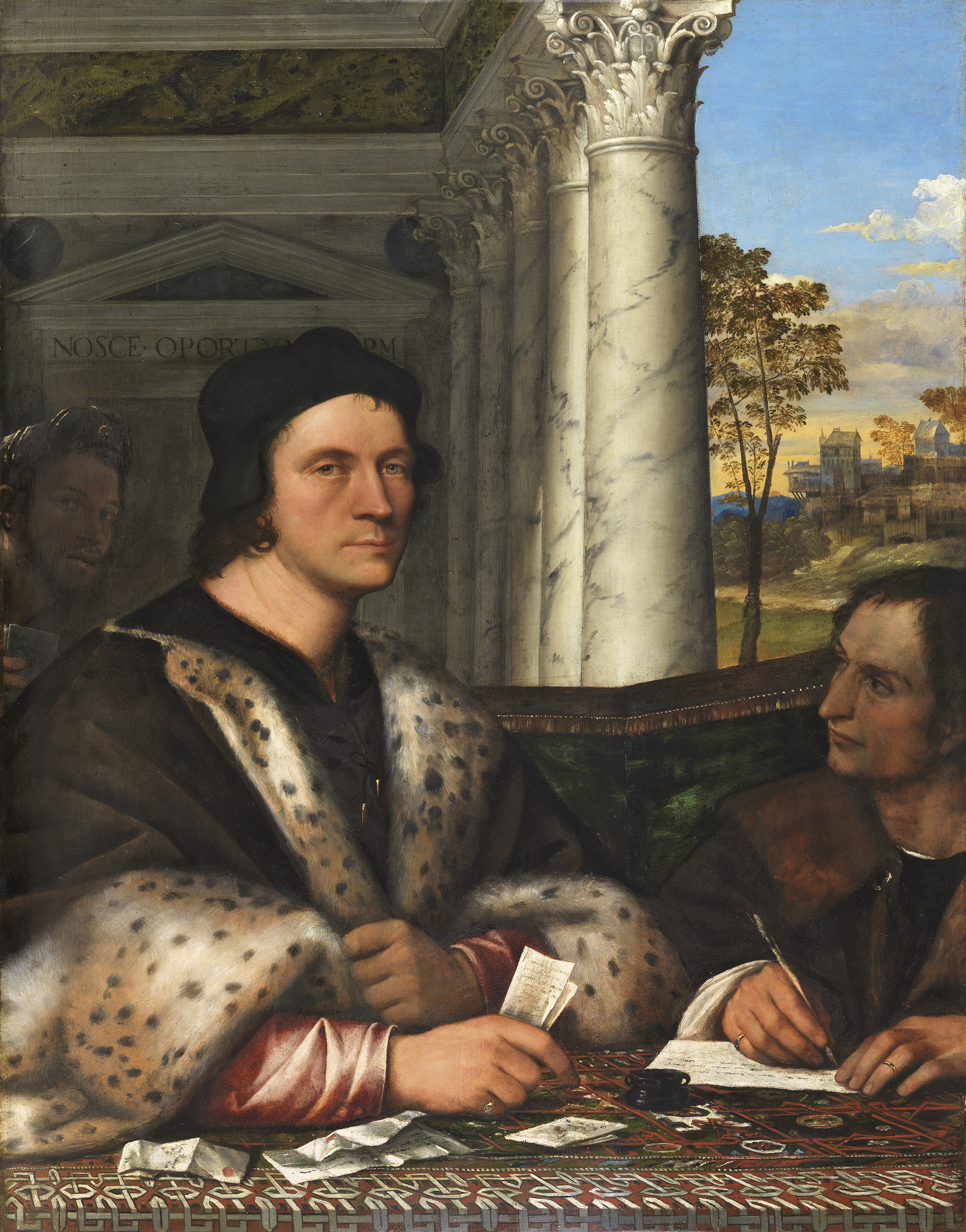
Ferry Carondelet with his Secretaries, 1512

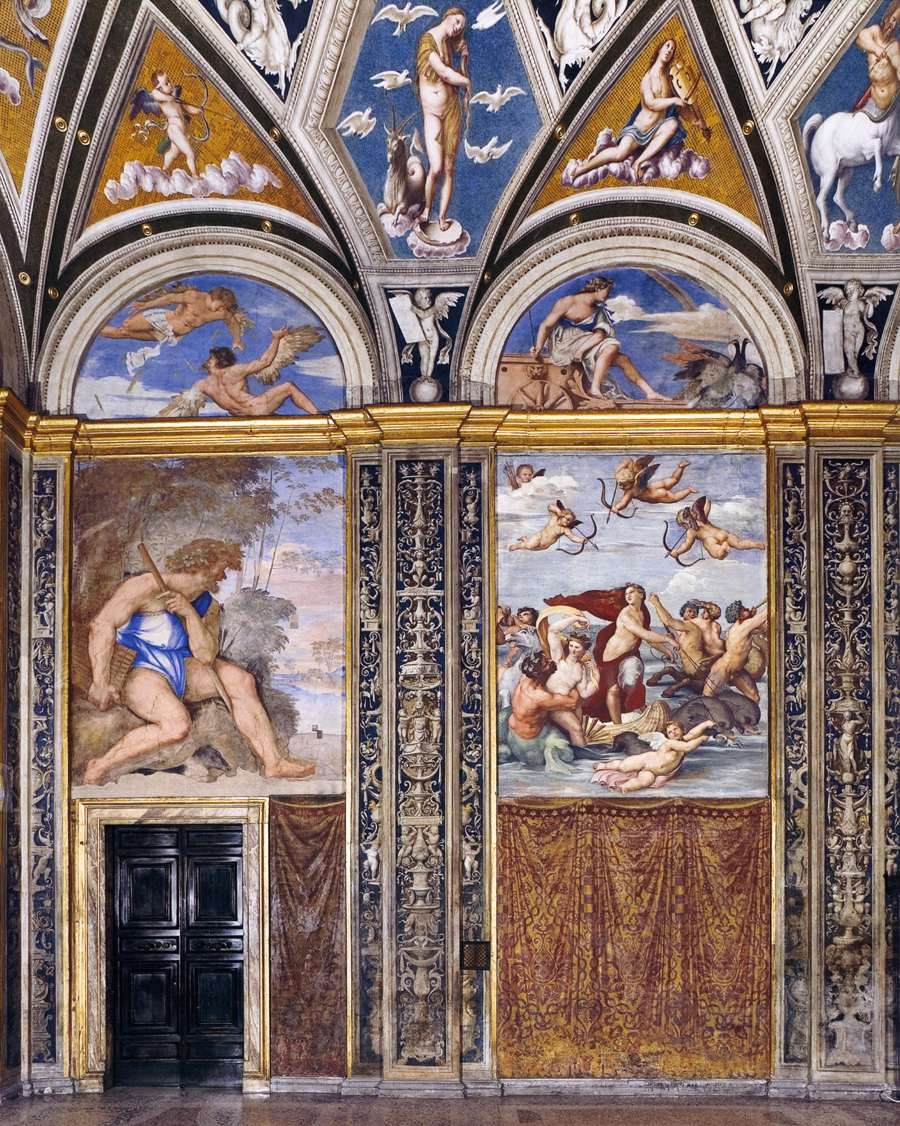
Sebastiano's Polyphemus next to Raphael's Galatea in the Villa Farnesina. Two of his lunettes above.

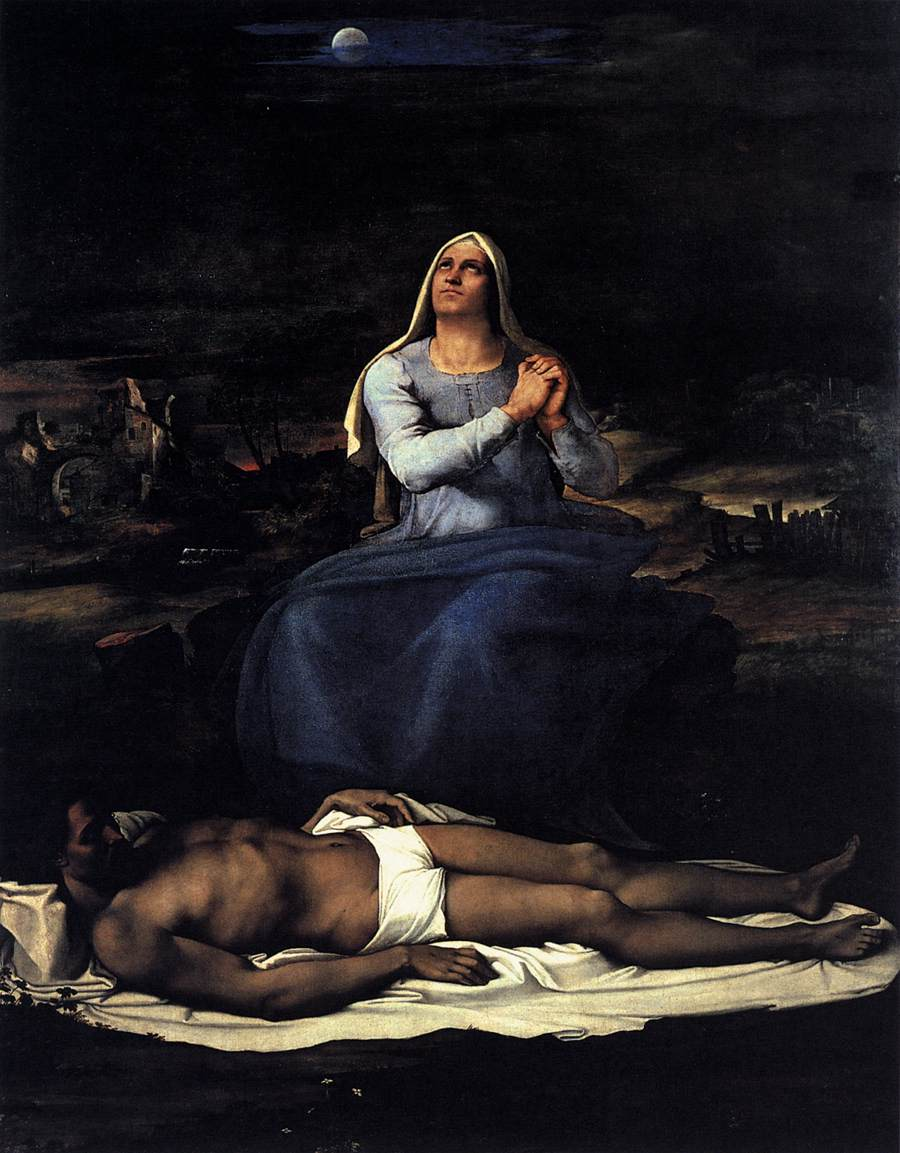
The Viterbo Pietà, c. 1515

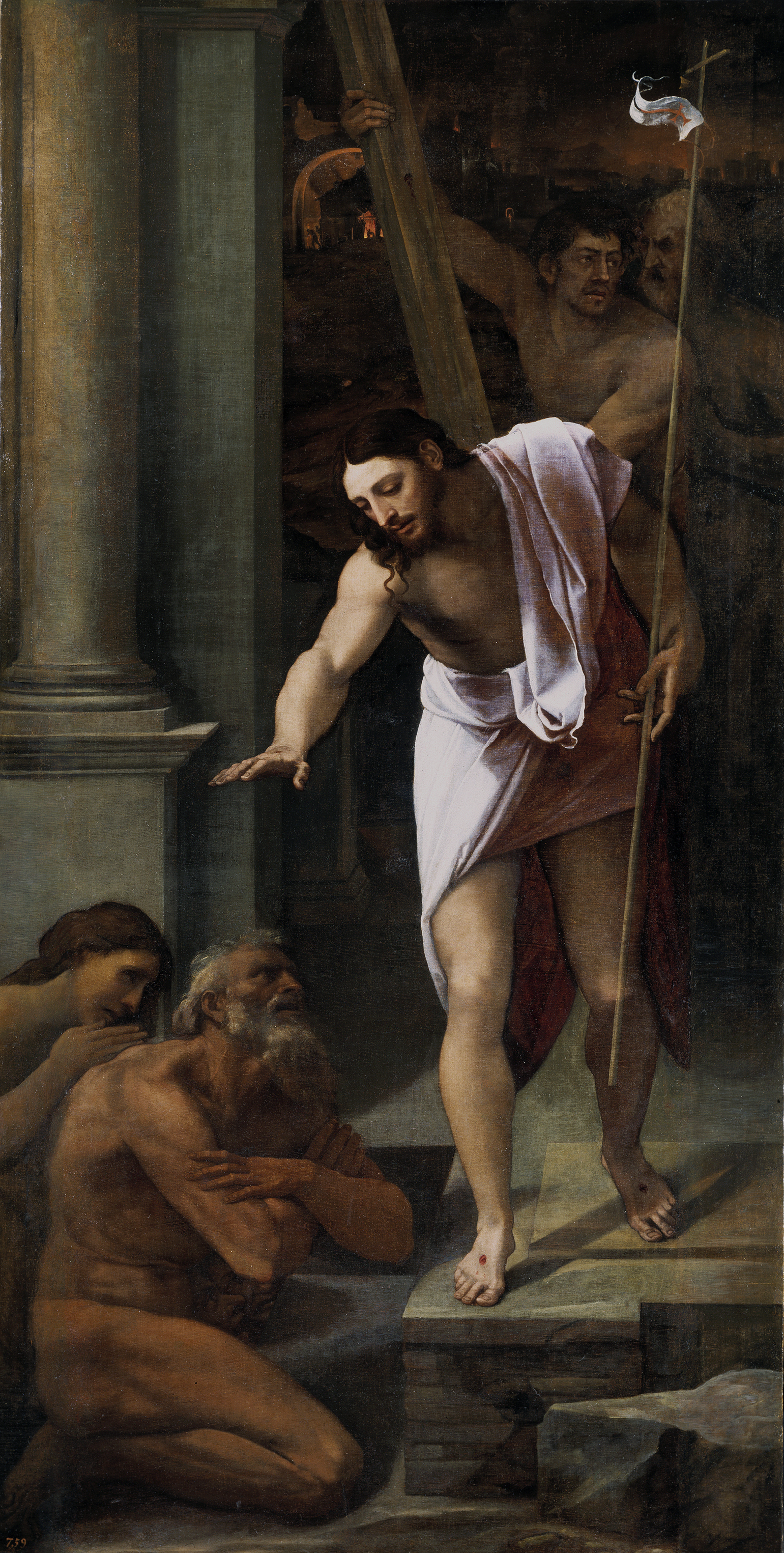
Descent into Limbo, 1516, left wing of a triptych.

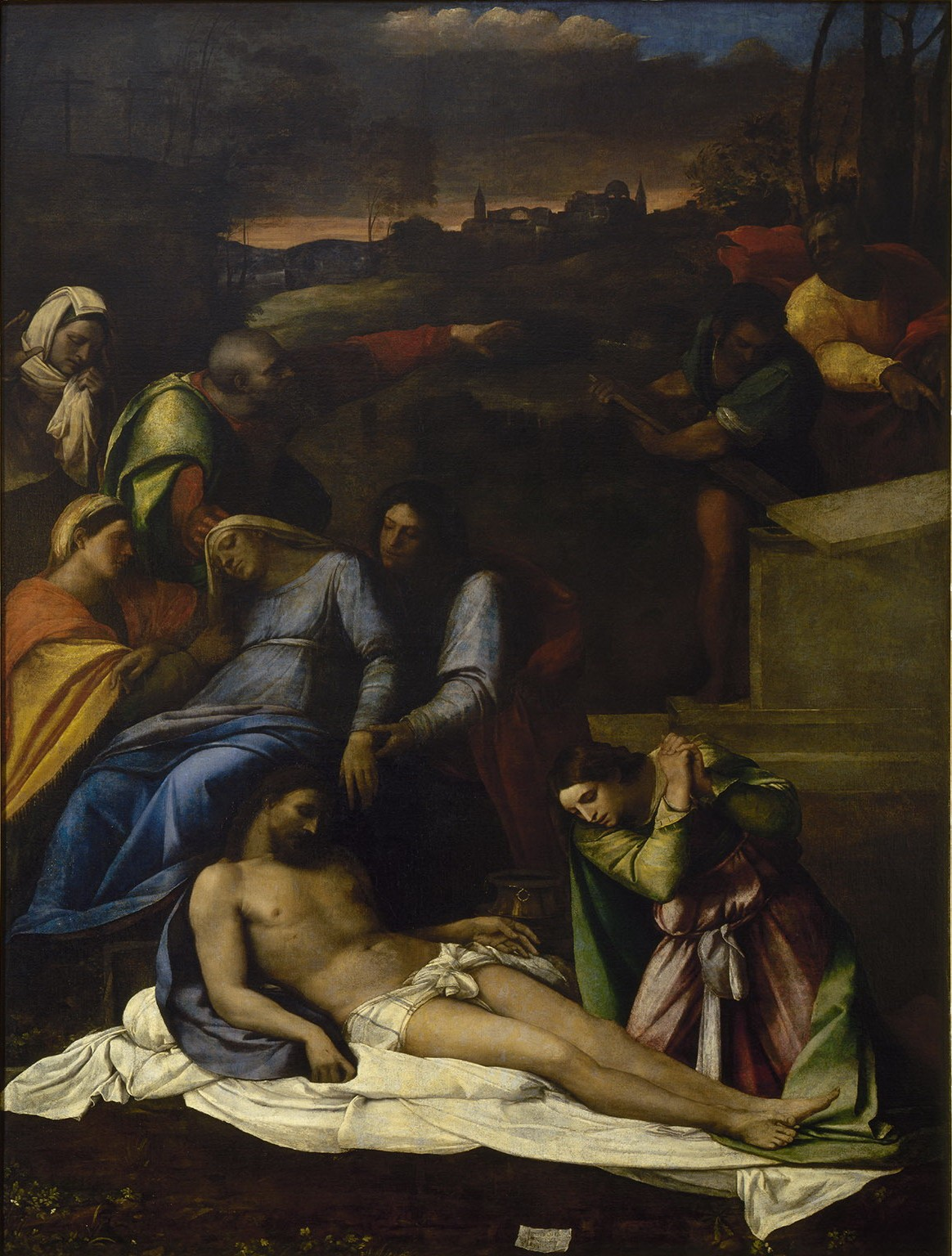
The Hermitage Museum Lamentation of Jesus, 1516, centre part of the triptych.

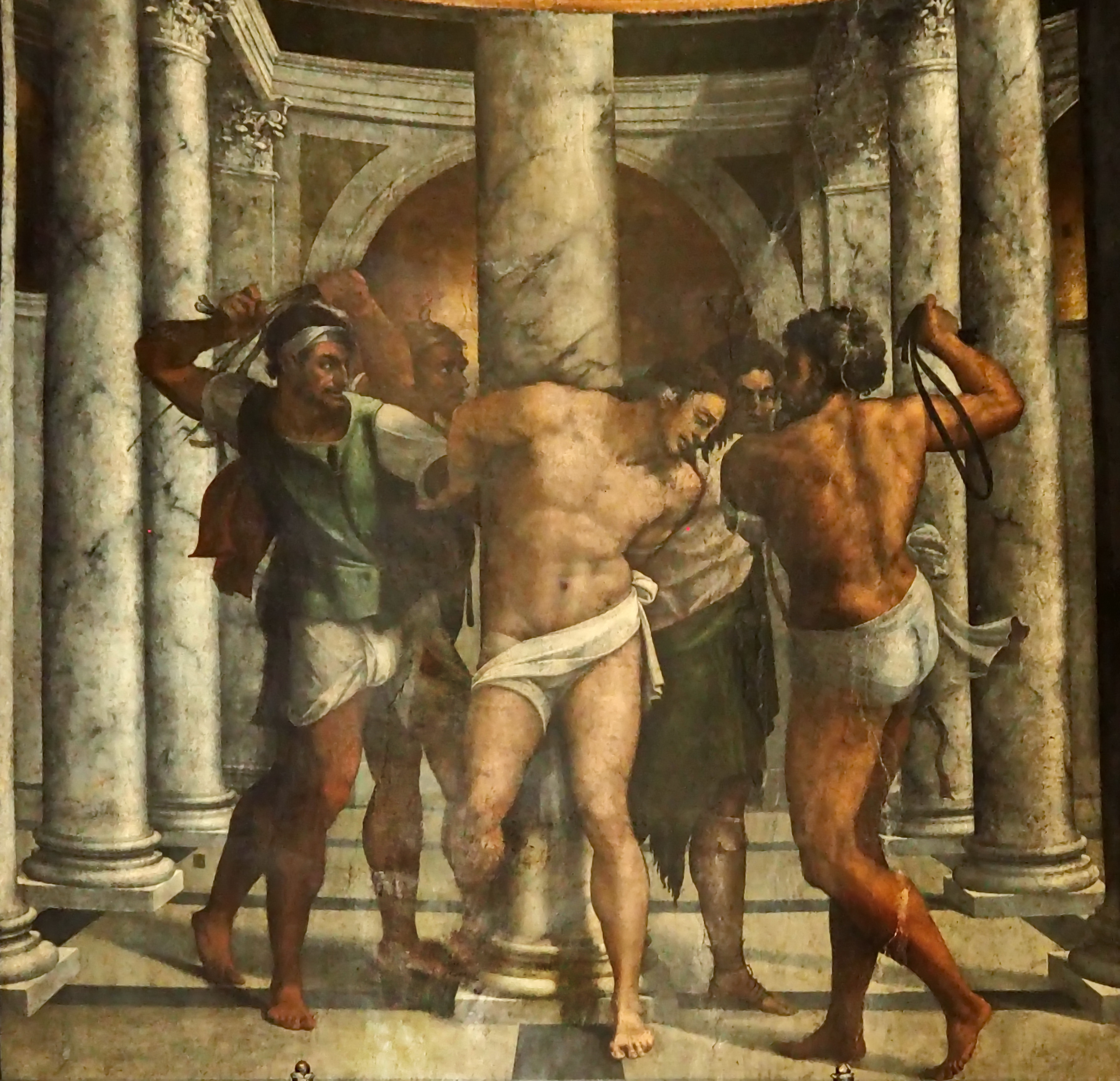
The Flagellation in San Pietro in Montorio, to a drawing by Michelangelo, 1516 or later.

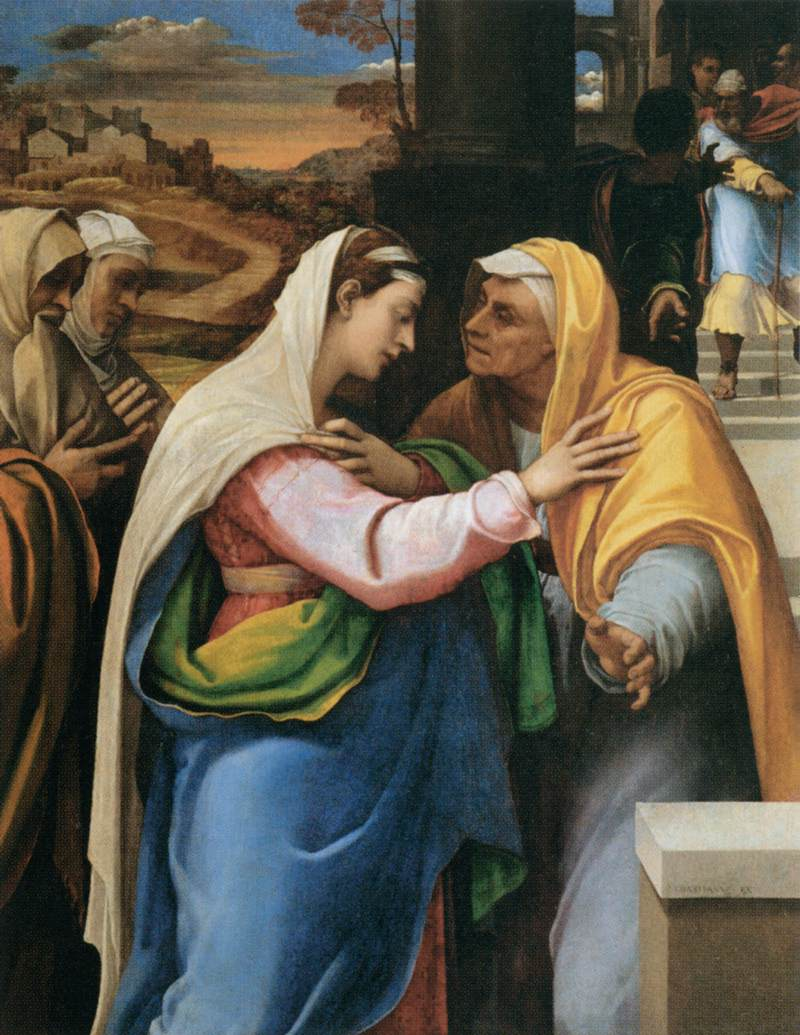
The Louvre Visitation, 1518–19

Portrait of a man, said to be Christopher Columbus, 1519

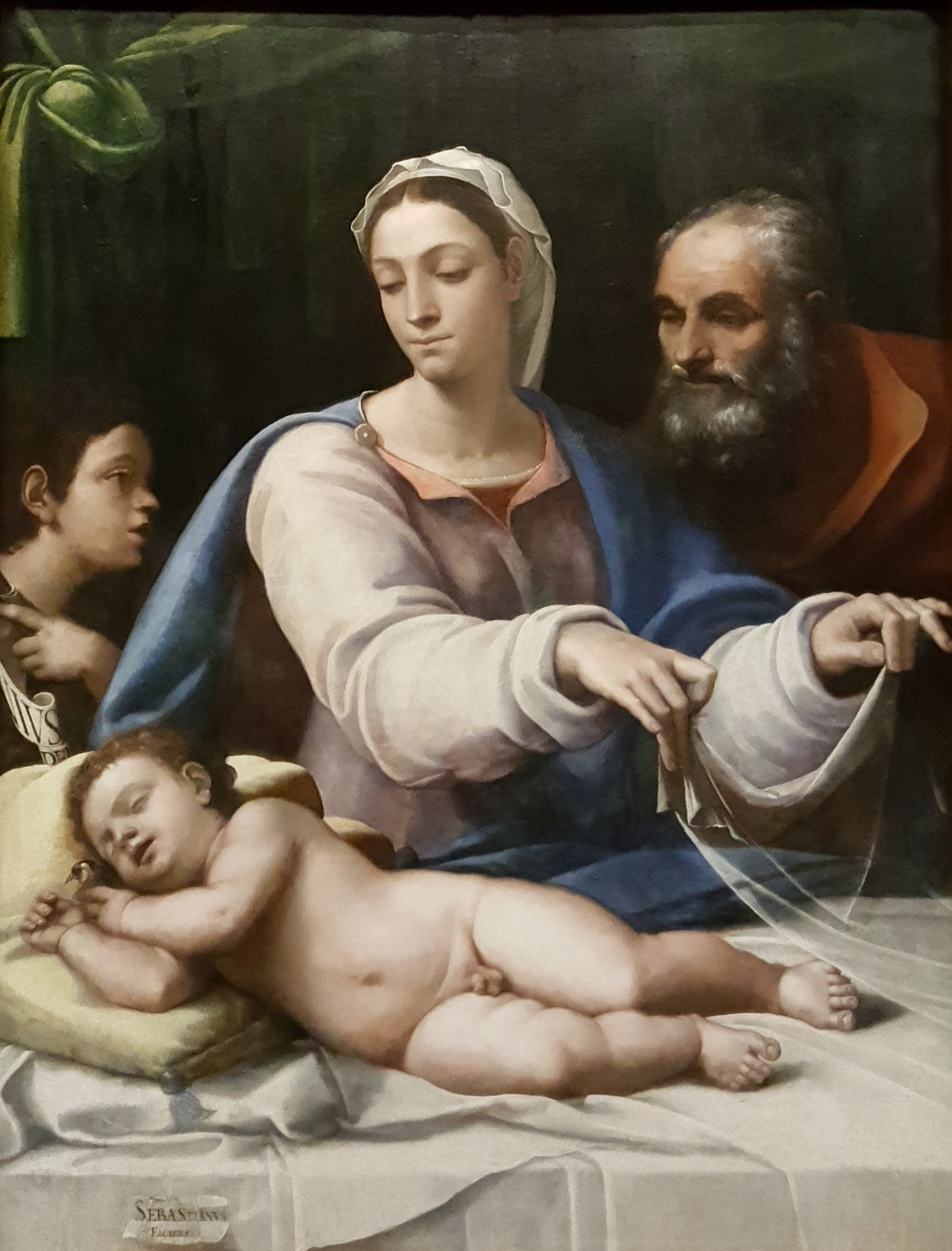
Madonna with the Veil (original version, Olomouc), c. 1525.

=== 1520–1531 ===
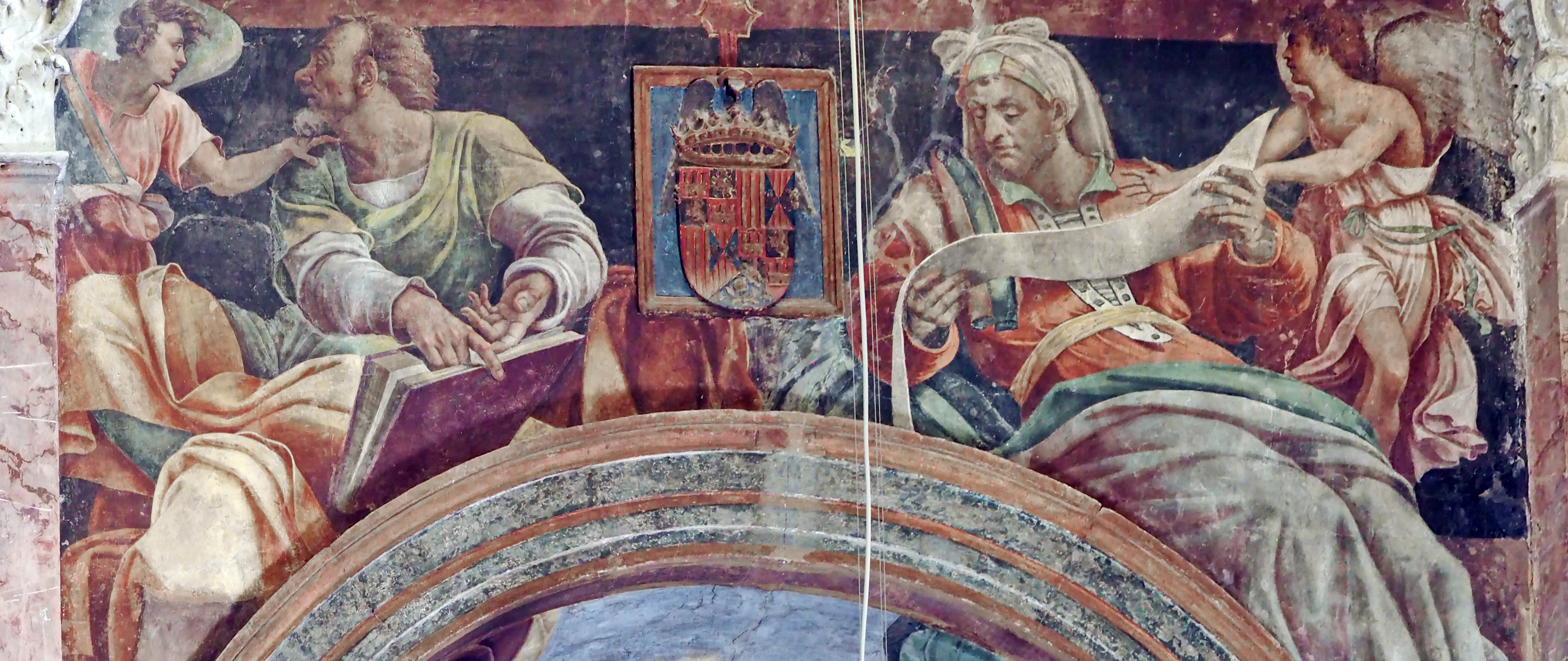
Matthew and Isaiah, over the Transfiguration in San Pietro in Montorio, by 1524

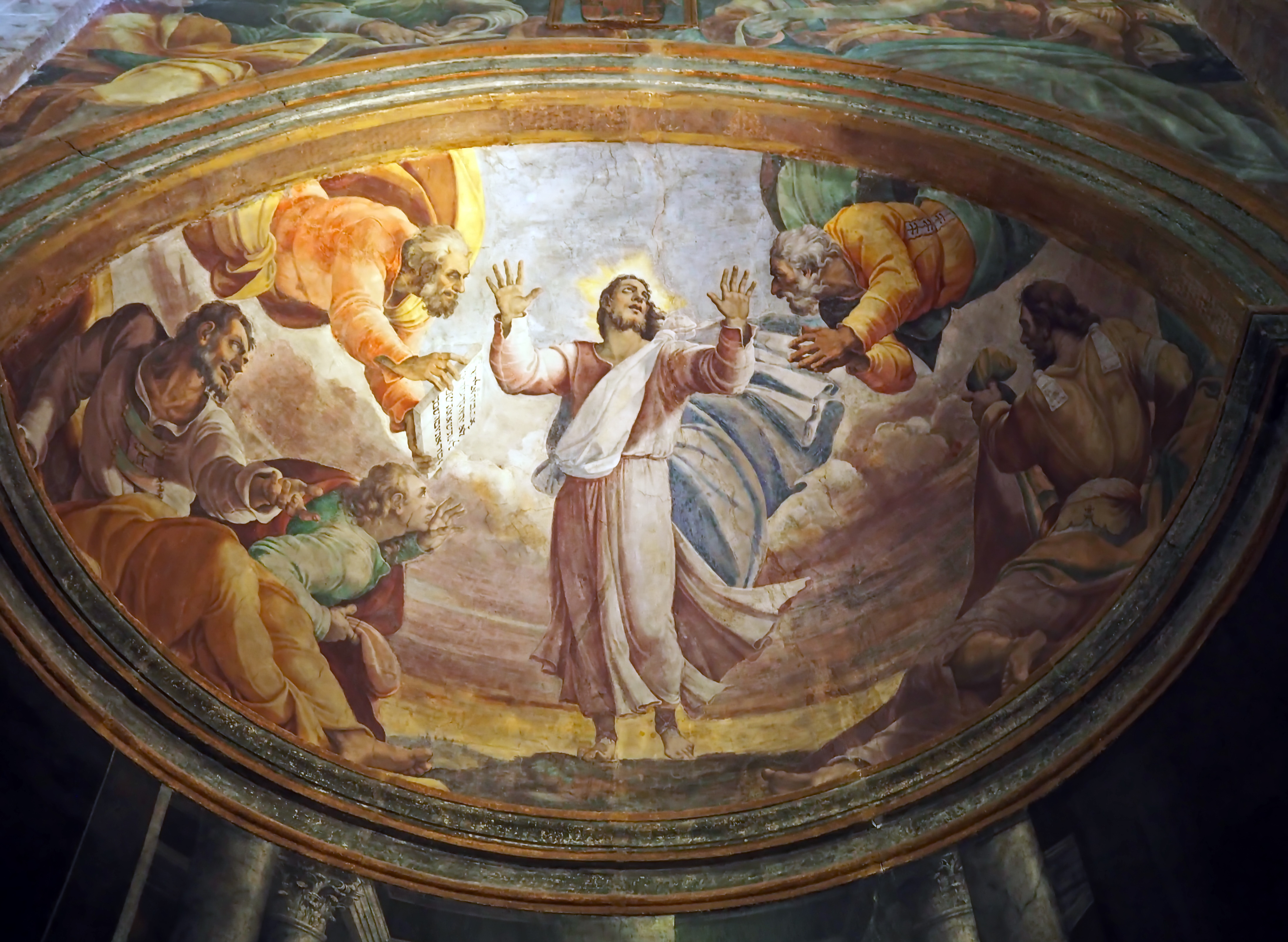
Fresco Transfiguration in San Pietro in Montorio, by 1524.

The death of Raphael in 1520, immediately before the exhibition of the two rival paintings intended for Narbonne, left Sebastiano clearly the leading painter operating in Rome. As his letters show, he immediately attempted to secure for himself the "Sala dei Pontefici", Raphael's next Vatican project, but was frustrated by Raphael's workshop, armed with the master's drawings, and his own inability to enlist Michelangelo's help, as the pope had told him to work exclusively on the long-promised Tomb of Pope Julius II. In the following years Sebastiano mostly avoided very large commissions for churches, and concentrated on portraits, where he had a considerable reputation, and religious easel paintings, such as his Visitation for France (1518–19, now Louvre), and his Madonna of the Veil (c. 1525), a very successful adaptation of Raphael's Madonna di Loreto. To both of these types he brought his refined monumental classicism.

His career in the decade was greatly impacted by outside events. In 1522 there was plague in Rome, and he may have left Rome for a long period; there is little evidence of his activity for over a year. In 1523 Giulio de Medici became Pope Clement VII, and thereafter Sebastiano seems to have been a part of Vatican court life. He painted a number of portraits of the pope, and other paintings for him. In 1527 he seems to have remained with the pope all through the horrors of the Sack of Rome and his nervous retreat to Orvieto, though he seems to have spent time in Venice in 1528 and perhaps 1529, his first known return there since 1511. This catastrophe brought to an end the High Renaissance epoch in Rome, scattering Raphael's workshop and the emerging Roman Mannerists, and largely destroying the confidence of patrons.

In 1531 the death of the previous holder allowed Sebastiano to press Pope Clement for the lucrative office of the "piombatore", which he obtained after promising to pay a fixed sum of 300 scudi annually to the other main contender, Giovanni da Udine, who was also a painter, from Raphael's workshop. To hold the position he had to take vows as a friar, despite having a wife and two children. After this his paintings, which are more often signed than dated, carry signatures such as "F(rater) Sebastianus Ven(etus)".

=== 1532–1547 ===
Sebastiano's artistic output reduced after taking the court role, though possibly not by as much as Vasari suggests. Large projects, even of a single painting, could take many years to complete, as with a Pieta for Spain. This was the last piece where Michelangelo helped him with a drawing. Vasari, probably much influenced by Michelangelo, places great emphasis on Sebastiano's turning away from art for a comfortable life as a well-paid courtier from this point, but may overstate the reality.

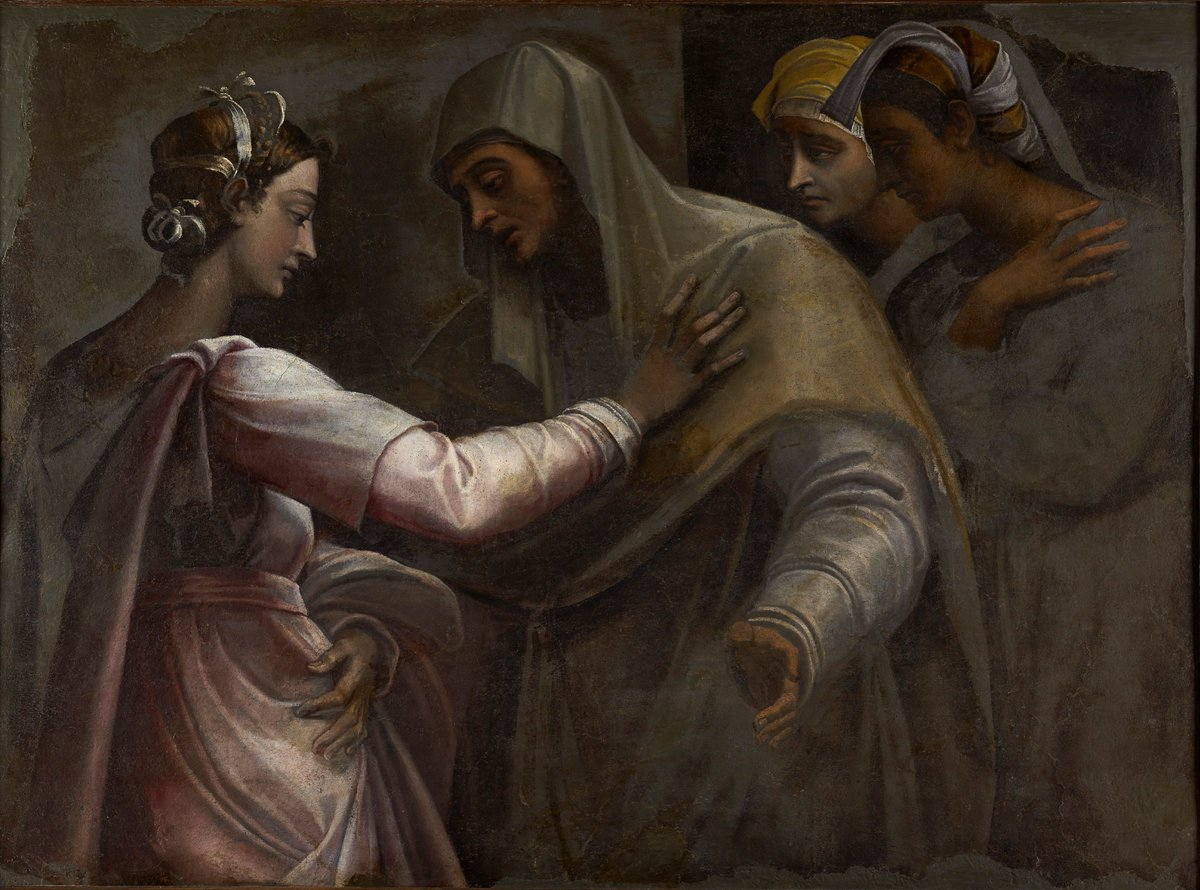
The largest fragment of the Visitation Sebastiano left unfinished; probably one of his last works, 1540s. Alnwick Castle.

His friendship with Michelangelo came to an end in 1534, after a disagreement over the latter's Last Judgment in the Sistine Chapel. Sebastiano encouraged the pope to insist that this picture should be executed in oil on plaster, the technique he had developed and used. The enormous wall was prepared with the smooth plaster needed for this, with Michelangelo apparently acquiescent. There may even have been the idea floated that Sebastiano might do the painting to Michelangelo's designs. Michelangelo may also have tried painting in oils on the smooth surface. It is clear that several months after the idea of using oils first appeared, Michelangelo finally and furiously rejected it, and insisted that the whole wall be re-plastered in the rough arriccio needed as a base for fresco. It was on this occasion that he famously said that oil painting was "an art for women and for leisurely and idle people like Fra Sebastiano".

Two late projects for churches were never finished by Sebastiano. A large altarpiece of the Birth of the Virgin, still in Santa Maria del Popolo, Rome, was begun in the late 1530s but had to be finished after his death by Francesco Salviati. Before his death in 1541, the executor of Agostino Chigi's estate commissioned a large Visitation as a memorial, in Santa Maria della Pace, Rome. It was still half-finished at Sebastiano's death in 1547, and was eventually removed in the 17th century. Fragments with some of the over life-size main figures are at Alnwick Castle, in a style of impressive simplicity, the end point of a "tendency to over-generalize appearances and pictorial structures so that they verged on an effect of geometrical abstraction" that had been increasing apparent in his work since his early years in Rome.

Vasari records that he died after a short illness on 14 June 1547, at the age of 62. His will directed that he be buried very simply in Santa Maria del Popolo, with the savings from not having an elaborate burial given to the poor. After efforts by Daniele da Volterra his remains were moved in 1561 to the predecessor of the Rome Accademia di San Luca.

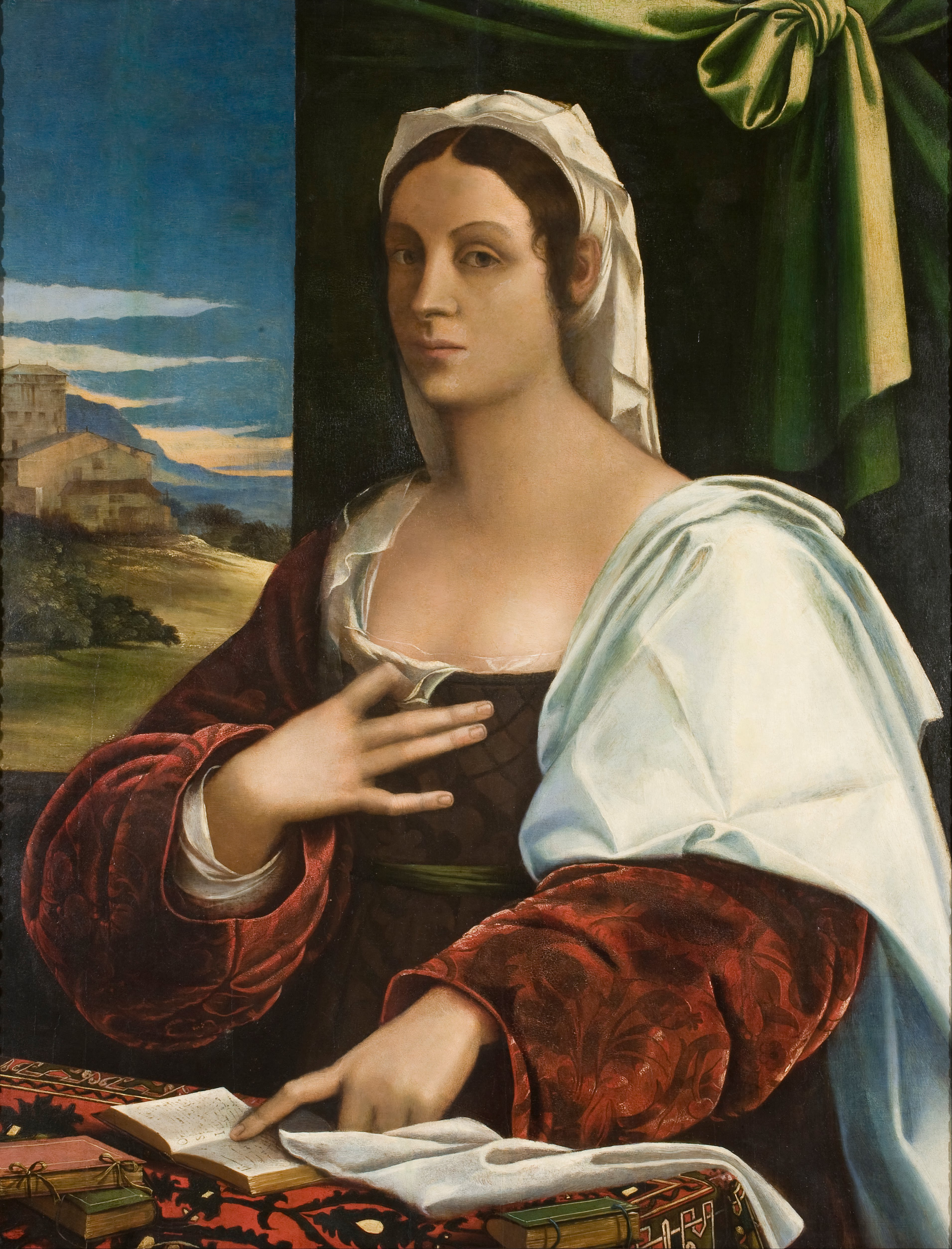
Said to be Vittoria Colonna, by 1525, already showing a very simplified treatment of form.

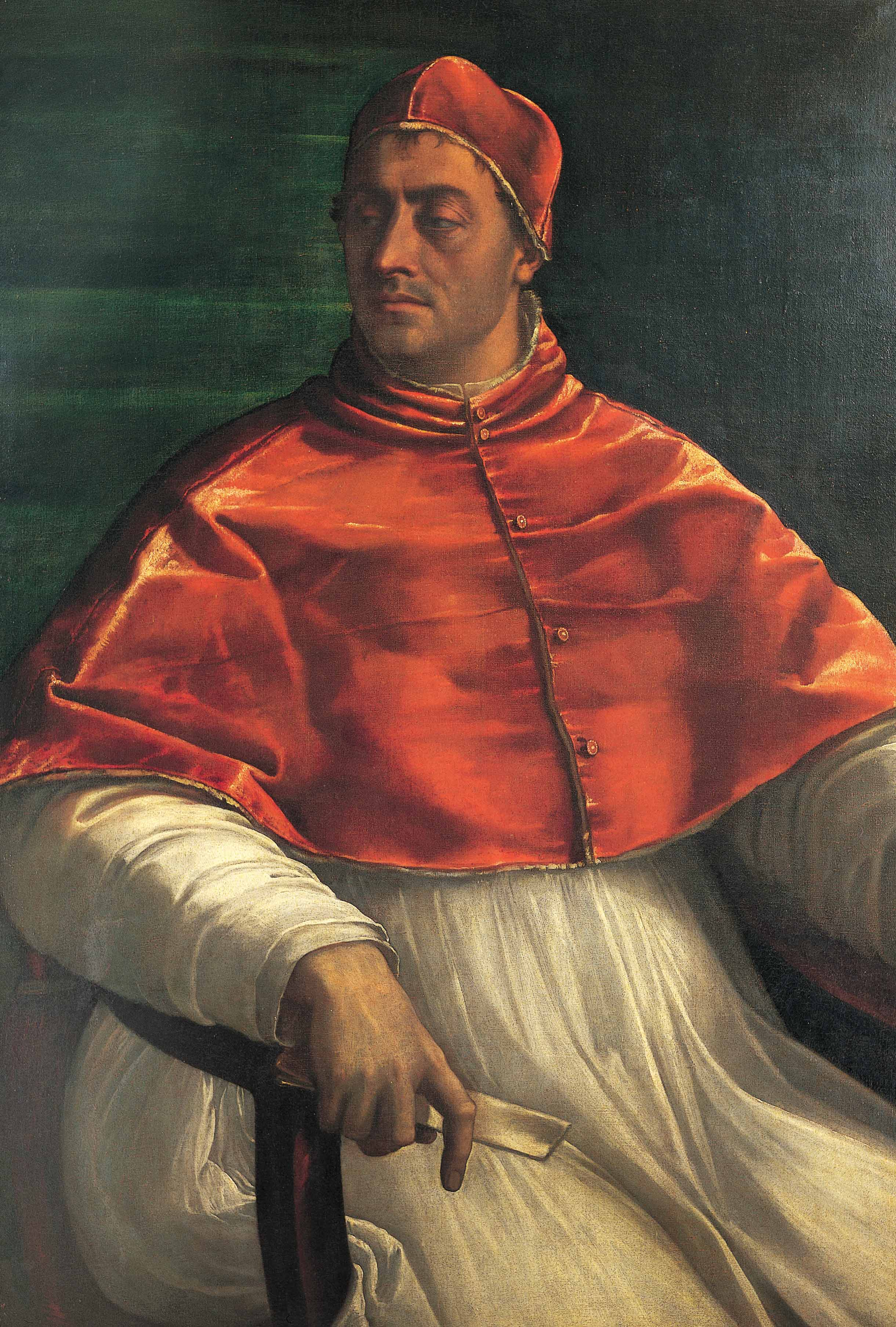
Pope Clement VII, about 1526

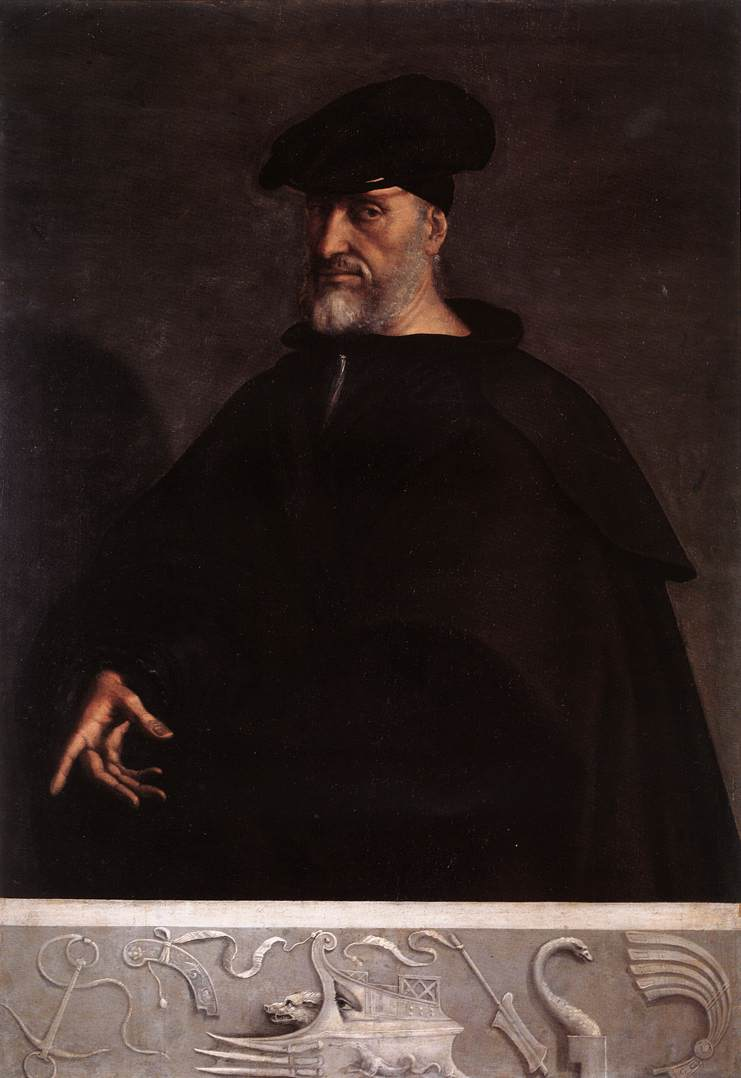
Andrea Doria, 1526

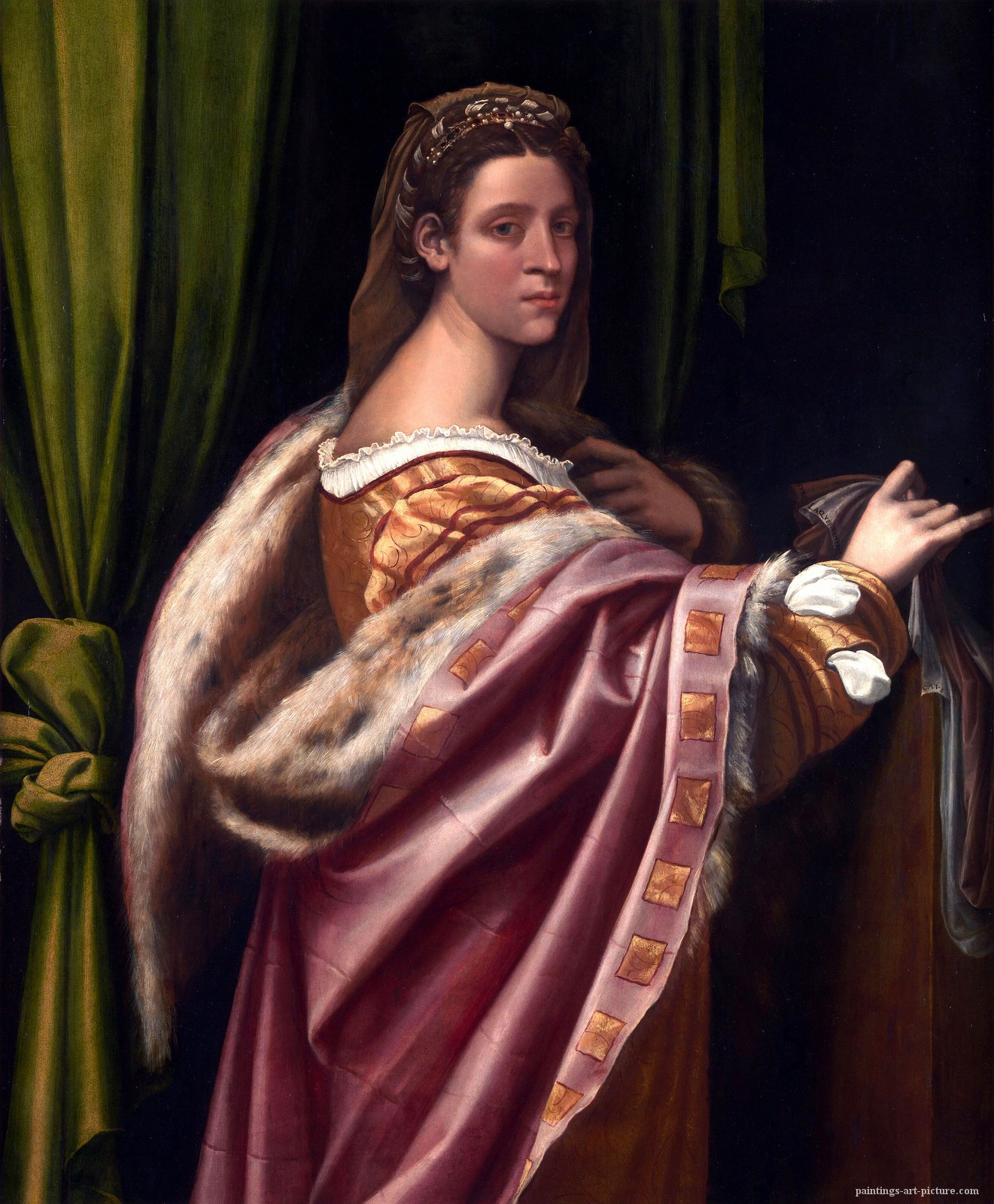
A Lady as Saint Agatha, after 1530, as signed with "F." for "Frate". Probably 1540s.

== Technique ==
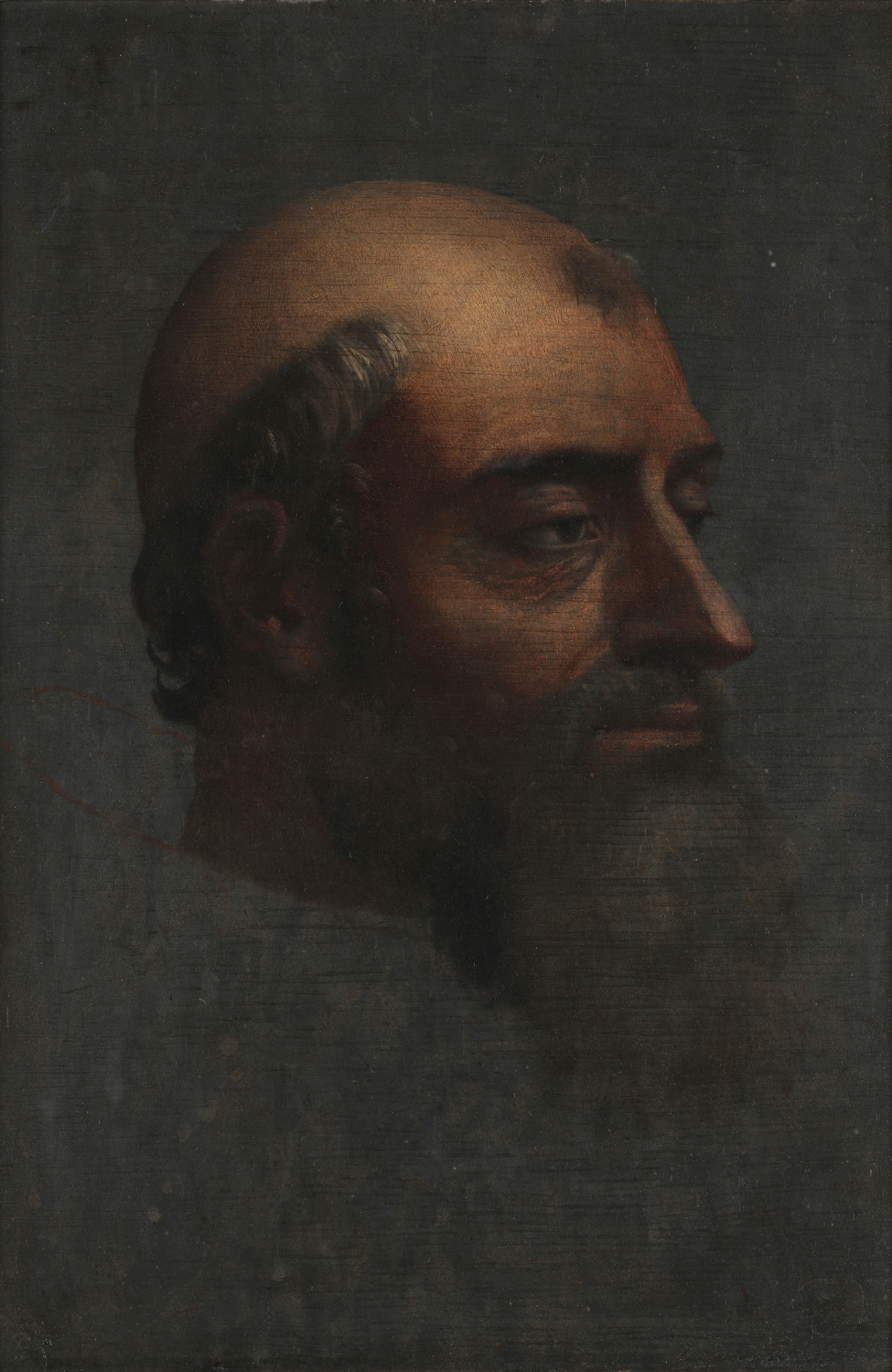
Portrait of Pope Clement VII on slate, c. 1531

Sebastiano was trained in the Venetian tradition of rich, subtly varying, colours in oil painting. In the Raising of Lazarus (1517–1519) he used a very wide range of pigments, often in complicated mixtures, and the painting can be seen as a display of Venetian skill for the Roman critics, attempting to achieve "the greatest and most subtly varied range of colours ever seen in a single painting". He became less interested in colour as his career progressed, and many later works are rather sombre, with touches of bright colour.

His early works generally use the Venetian technique of freehand underdrawing on the surface to be painted, no doubt following a relatively approximate sketch, as was his technique for the Kingston Lacy Judgement of Solomon. But after some years in Rome he began to use full-size cartoons for frescos, which were pricked along the lines and then soot "pounced" through, to give dotted lines on the surface for the artist to follow. This technique, normal in Florence and Rome, was used in the fresco Transfiguration of the Borgherini Chapel, for which some pricked sheets survive. However, this was his last work in fresco.

From early on he was innovative and ready to experiment in compositional details as well as technique, with a special interest in painting in oils on new surfaces, whether plaster, stone, alabaster or slate. Though tending to be dark, several of his works with these unorthodox backings have survived well. Though he often covered the whole surface, leaving no indication of the support, some of his paintings on mineral sheets leave the background unpainted. This is the case with a small head of Clement VII in Naples, wearing the beard he always had as a penance after the Sack of Rome.

He made excellent drawings, nearly all as compositional sketches. He continued to prefer to draw on light blue paper in black chalk with white highlights, a Venetian habit. Few if any early ones survive, and he may have changed his methods to use more precise sketches under the influence of Michelangelo and Raphael. Few survive for his portraits. A British Museum "curator's comment" on one of their late drawings notes: "As so often with Sebastiano's drawings, the first impression is one of unrhythmic dryness; but the suggestion of atmosphere, the sensitively drawn contemplative faces and the subtle use of reflected lights and tonal transitions leave no doubt that [this] is from his own hand.

== Pupils ==
Sebastiano seems to have followed Michelangelo in painting with "no more than merely mechanical assistance" from a studio, and had no significant pupils formed in his style. Whether this was a cause or result of his avoidance of large compositions and his court office from the 1530s we cannot know.

== Personal life and relationship with Michelangelo ==
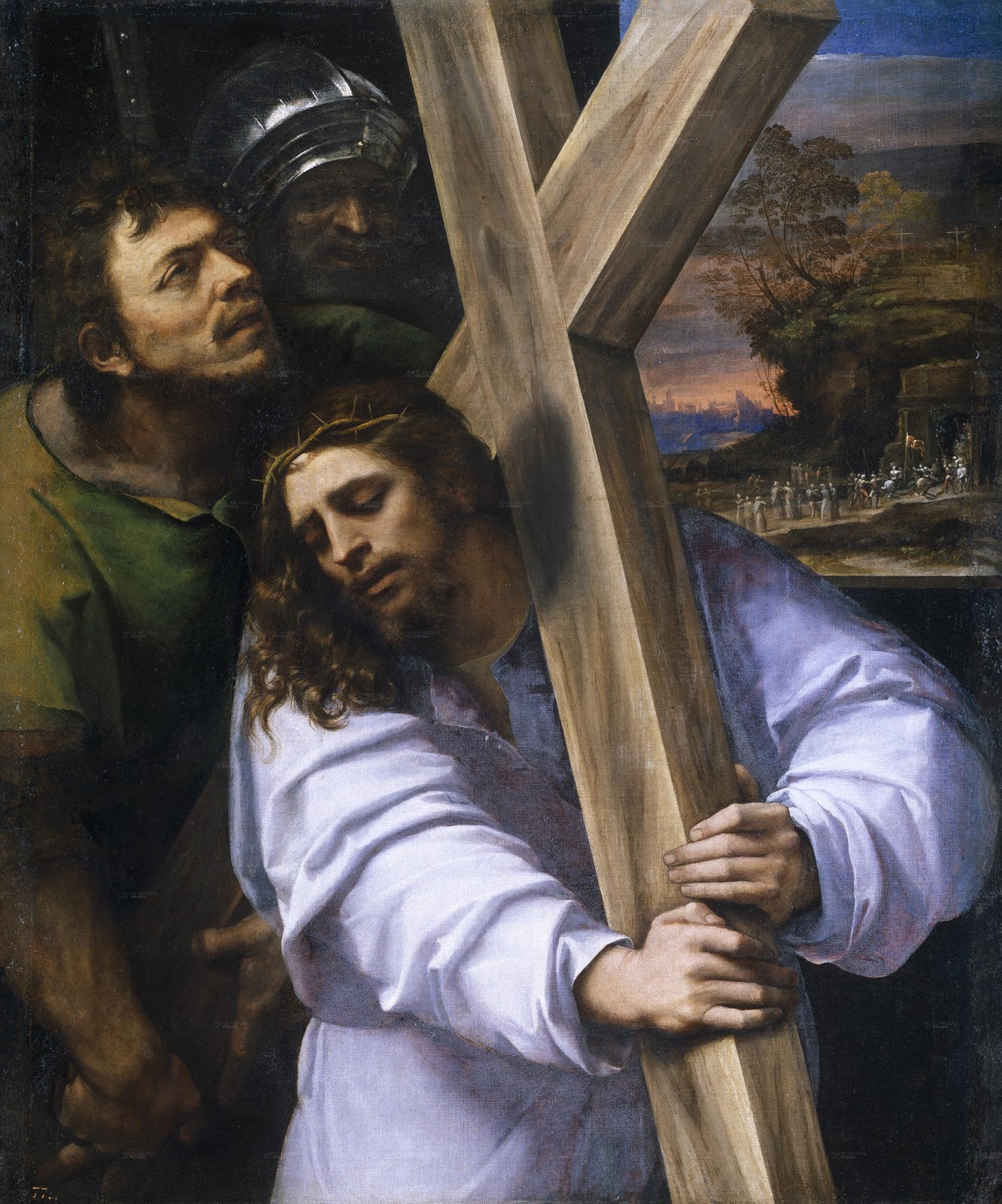
Christ Carrying the Cross, about 1513–14, showing "how rapidly he assimilated Michelangelo's monumental treatment of the figure", even before they became close.

The main sources for his personality and habits are Vasari and surviving letters, mostly to and from Michelangelo. Vasari knew Sebastiano, but probably not very well; although he had been compiling material for some time, the first edition of his Lives did not appear until 1550, after Sebastiano's death, and it is not clear if he had specifically discussed the biography with Sebastiano. He knew Michelangelo rather better, and his description of Sebastiano is probably heavily influenced by the hostile attitude Michelangelo had towards Sebastiano after 1534. Vasari takes up much of his Life bemoaning Sebastiano's supposed indolence and neglect of his artistic talent for a comfortable and convivial life, at least after 1531.

Vasari says that in later life he lived in a fine house near the Piazza del Popolo, keeping a very good table, and often entertaining regular friends as well as visitors. He says he was always cheerful and humorous, and very good company. He became red-faced and rather fat, as the bearded portrait in the Lives suggests.

As described above, he had become close to Michelangelo by about 1515. Though they eventually fell out, few people were able to remain on good terms with Michelangelo for a period of nearly twenty years. In 1519 Michelangelo became godfather to Sebastiano's first son, Luciano, after which Sebastiano addressed his letters to "My dearest compare" ("godfather"). The relationship suffered a dip in 1520 when Sebastiano asked Michelangelo to write to Cardinal Bibbiena, a close friend of Pope Leo X, recommending Sebastiano for projects in the Vatican after Raphael's death. Michelangelo sent the letter a month or so later, which Sebastiano presented to the cardinal, without reading it. The letter was in very flippant terms, and Sebastiano complained that it became "practically the only topic of conversation at the Palace, and it makes everyone laugh". Nor did it work in getting Vatican commissions.

In 1521 he acted as Michelangelo's agent in the installation of the Risen Christ or Cristo della Minerva in Rome, which was botched by the assistant Michelangelo had sent. From 1525 there is a draft for an emotional letter by Michelangelo passing on praise for Sebastiano by one "Captain Cuio", who he had dined with. In 1531 Sebastiano writes a despondent letter describing how "I still don't feel I am the same Bastiano that I was before the Sack; I still don't feel in my right mind." The relationship never recovered from the argument over the Last Judgement in 1534, described above.

== Selected works ==
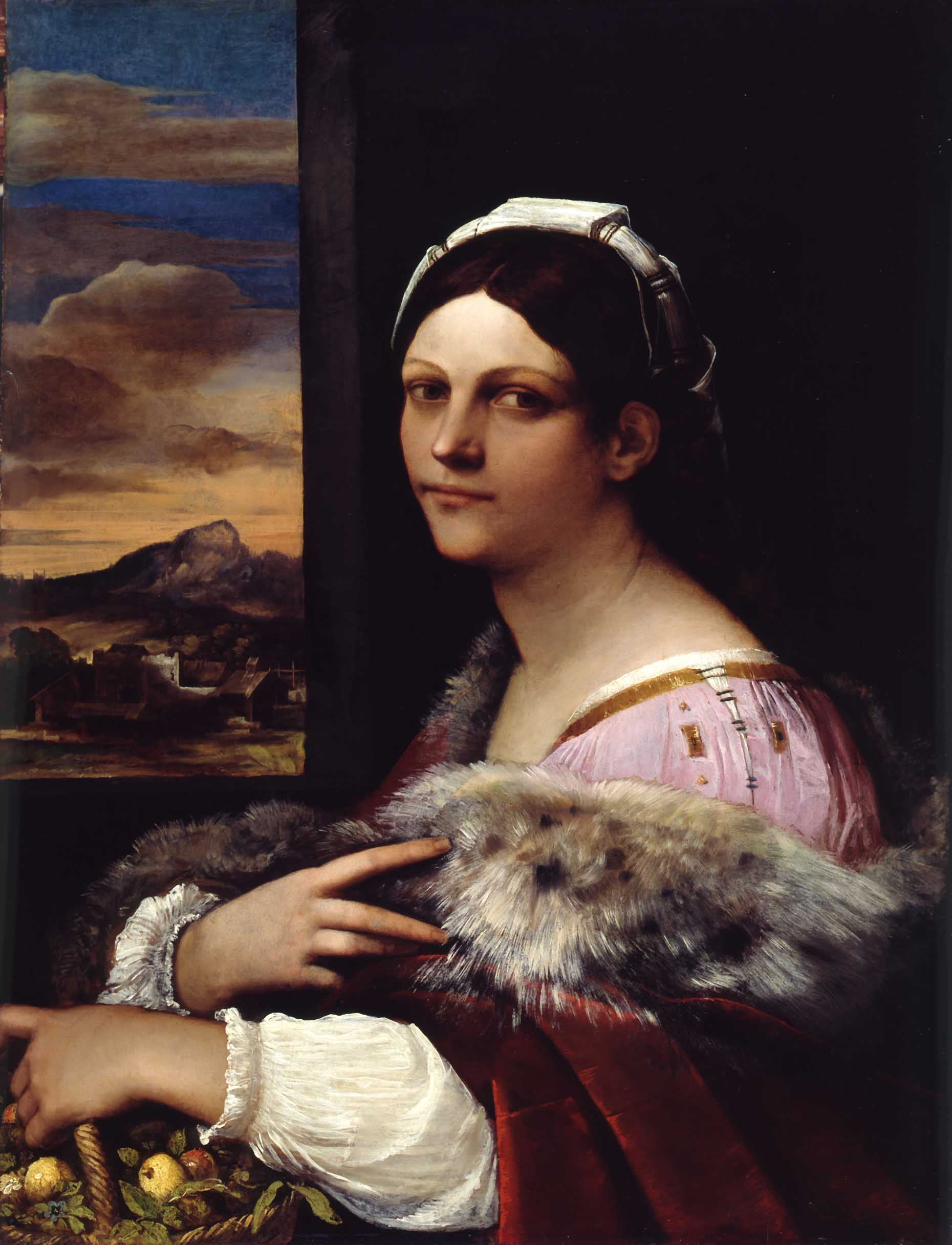
Saint Dorothy, c. 1512, early years in Rome

Venetian period

- Judgement of Solomon, Kingston Lacy, c. 1505–1510, unfinished
- Altarpiece in San Giovanni Grisostomo, Venice (c. 1509)
- Organ-shutters of San Bartolomeo, Venice, now Gallerie dell'Accademia, Venice
- Portrait of a Young Woman as a Wise Virgin (1510) National Gallery of Art, Washington
- Salome or Judith, 1510, National Gallery, London

Roman period

- Polyphemus (1511) – fresco, Villa Farnesina, Rome
- The Metamorphosis (1511) – fresco, Villa Farnesina, Rome
- Christ Carrying the Cross, c. 1513–14, Prado
- Martyrdom of St. Agatha – Palazzo Pitti, Florence
- Portrait of a Man (c. 1515) – Oil on poplar, 115 x 94 cm, Museum of Fine Arts, Budapest
- Portrait of a Girl (c. 1515) – Oil on wood, 52,5 x 42,8 cm, Museum of Fine Arts, Budapest
- Portrait of a Warrior (c. 1515)
- Cardinal Bandinello Sauli, His Secretary, and Two Geographers (1516) National Gallery of Art, Washington
- Christ descending into Limbo – Prado Museum, Madrid , 1516
- Transfiguration, Flagellation, saints and prophets San Pietro in Montorio, Rome , 1516–1524
- A Prophet Addressed by an Angel (1516–17) National Gallery of Art, Washington
- Pietà (c. 1517) – Panel painting, Museo Civico, Viterbo, Italy
- The Raising of Lazarus (1519) National Gallery, London
- Hoy Family (c. 1520) Burgos Cathedral
- Portrait of a Humanist (1520) National Gallery, Washington D.C.
- Portrait of Andrea Doria (1526) Galleria Doria Pamphilj, Rome
- Portrait of Pope Clement VII (half-length, about 1526) Museo di Capodimonte, Naples
- Portrait of Clement VII (with beard, c. 1531) – Oil on Slate 105.4 x 87.6 cm Getty Museum, Los Angeles
- Portrait head of Clement VII on slate, c. 1531, Museo di Capodimonte, Naples
- Birth of the Virgin – Oil on peperino, Santa Maria del Popolo, Rome, never finished
- Christ Carrying the Cross (1535–1540) – Oil on slate, 157 x 118 cm, Museum of Fine Arts, Budapest
- A Lady as Saint Agatha, after 1530, as signed with "F." for "Frate". Probably 1540s, National Gallery, London
- Visitation, originally Santa Maria della Pace, Rome, unfinished with 3 fragments now Alnwick Castle, 1540s
