= Van den Eynde (family) =

Noble family

- noble family
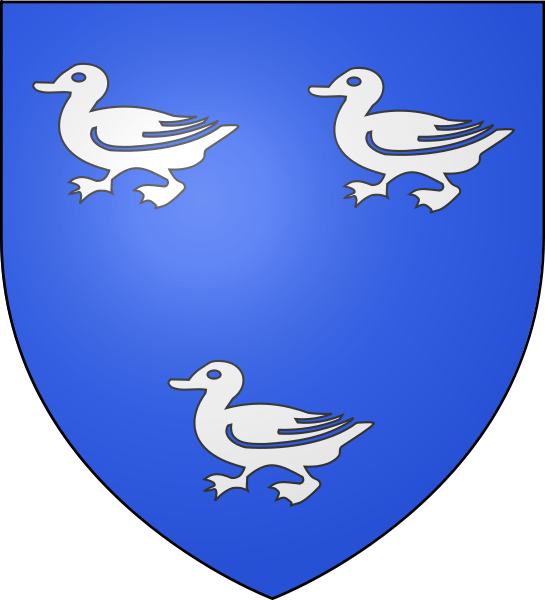
- Coat of Arms
- Country: Netherlands, Belgium, Italy
- Founded: 15th century
- Titles: Marquess, Prince, Baron, Lord, Pensionary, Jonkheer, Castellan

Van den Eynde (Dutch pronunciation: [vɑn dən ˈɛində, vɑn də ˈʔɛində]) is the name of an old Netherlandish noble family. One of the earliest recorded Van den Eynde to use the three-duck canting arms was Jacob van den Eynde, first Councilor and pensionary of Delft, and the highest official in the county of Holland. The Van den Eynde became especially prominent in 16th-century Delft, 17th-century Antwerp (from whence the surname likely originates) and Naples.

== History ==
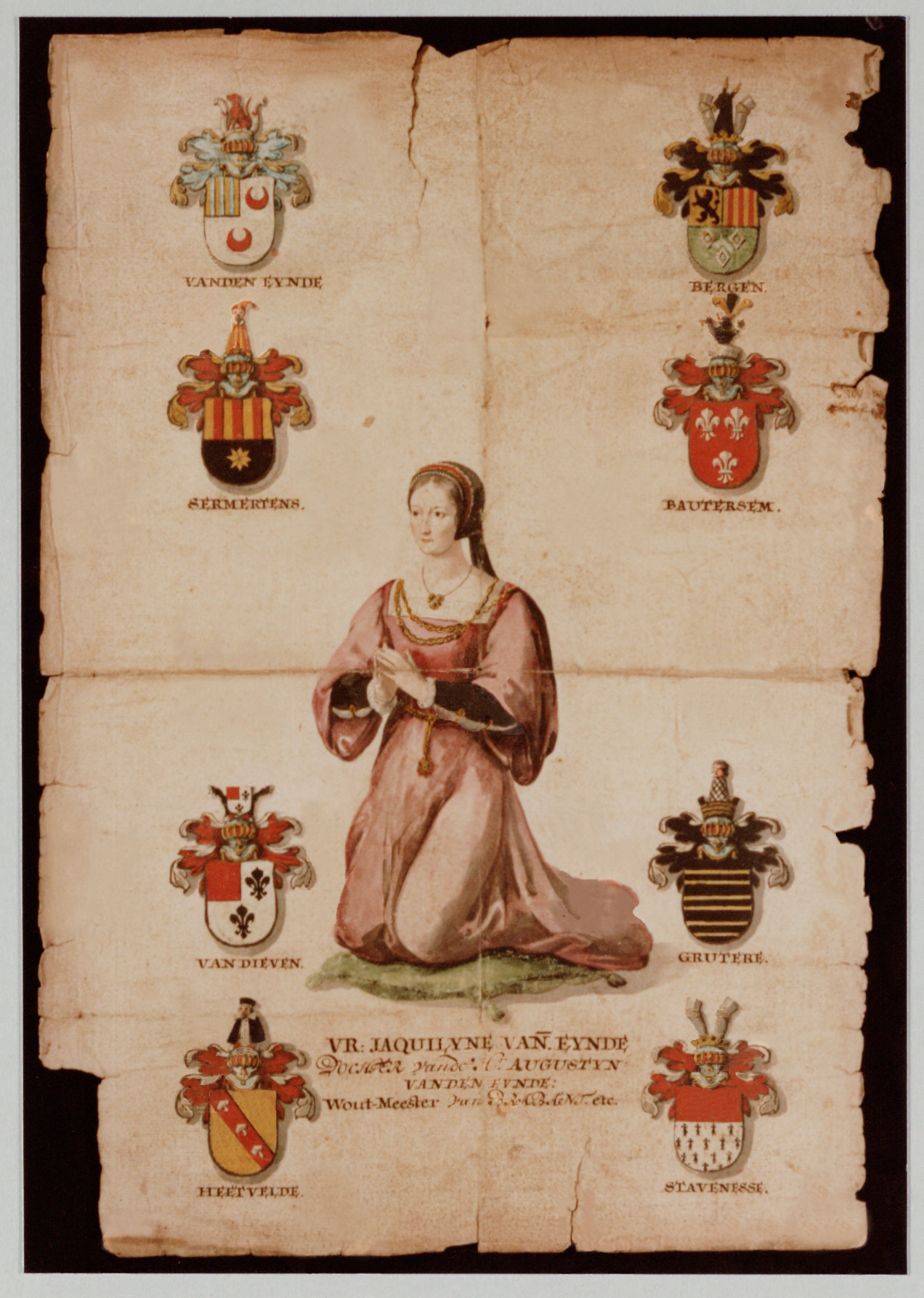
Jacoba van den Eynde. On the upper left, the Utrecht Van den Eynde 15th-century coat of arms

=== Surname ===
Eynde means end in Middle English. Likewise, in modern Dutch, einde stands for end. Van den is a very common prefix in Dutch language surnames, meaning "of the" or "from the." Although often assumed to derive "from the end", Van den Eynde likely stood for "of the duck" originally. In Dutch, "duck" is eend (Dutch: [eːnt]). Eenden (Dutch pronunciation) is the Dutch plural form of eend. This is evinced in the Van den Eynde coat of arms, from which the surname might derive. Alternatively, the heraldic bearing might have been created to represent the bearer's name.

One of the earliest recorded Van den Eynde to use the three-duck coat of arms was Jacob van den Eynde, a statesman from Delft. Jacob van den Eynde was first Councilor and pensionary of Delft. In 1560 he became Grand Pensionary of Holland. In 1568 he was accused of heresy and taken to Brussels, where he died in prison while awaiting trial. Jacob van den Eynde was married to Elisabeth van Nieulant, from Bruges. One of their several children, Egidius, was born in Puurs, Antwerp. (Note: Egidius decided to stay and live in his city of birth after its fall. Likewise, his descendants chose to stay in Antwerp, in the Spanish Netherlands.) Another of Van den Eynde's children, also named Jacob, was a Jonkheer, and the castellan of Woerden. Jacob was the father of Jhr. Jacob van den Eynde (or Jacques van den Eynde; or Jacobus Eyndius), the famous poet and captain in Prince Maurice's army, who settled in Zeeland. He acquired the manor of Haamstede and rebuilt the Haamstede Castle, which had been a ruin since a fire devastated it in 1528. Some Van den Eyndes had earlier achieved prominence in nearby Utrecht, where they became associated with the Tuyll. Jacoba van den Eynde married Jacob van Serooskerke. Jacoba (or Jacqueline) was the daughter of Augustyn van den Eynde, of the House of Van den Eynde, Opper Woutmeester of Brabant. She and her husband resided at Zuylen Castle. In the late 15th and early 16th century, the Utrecht Van den Eynde used a different crest there. In 1582, Emerentia van den Eynde, daughter of Karel van den Eynde, Treasurer-General of Oorlogen, (Note: (war)) married Willem van Beveren.

=== Neapolitan branch ===
In the early 17th century, two Van den Eyndes from Antwerp, Ferdinand van den Eynde and his brother Jan, moved to Italy. Ferdinand, the elder, was a merchant and art dealer who settled in Rome, where he became part of the local Netherlandish community. He hoarded a valuable collection of paintings executed by some of the most prominent artists of the day, which he bequeathed to his brother Jan upon his untimely death in 1630. Ferdinand van den Eynde was buried in the church of Santa Maria dell'Anima in Rome. His sculptural epitaph was executed by François Duquesnoy.

Jan van den Eynde established himself in Naples. He quickly enlarged his riches by trading in grain and gems. He later became a successful banker. In 1636 Jan van den Eynde became a business partner of Gaspar Roomer, and the co-owner of his firm. Roomer's company dealt in luxury goods, lace, silk, grain, diamonds and ship insurance. When Van den Eynde became Roomer's partner there was a substantial increase in the company's volume of business, particularly in brokering operations and silk trading. Ferdinand and Jan van den Eynde traded goods between Antwerp and Southern Italy with ease, thanks to their connections in the Flemish city. They moved artworks between Antwerp and Italy as well, contributing to the spread of "new tastes and art movements" in Naples. The Van den Eynde were related by blood and by marriage to several notable Netherlandish artists, including Brueghel, de Jode, Lucas and Cornelis de Wael, and the Gillemans.

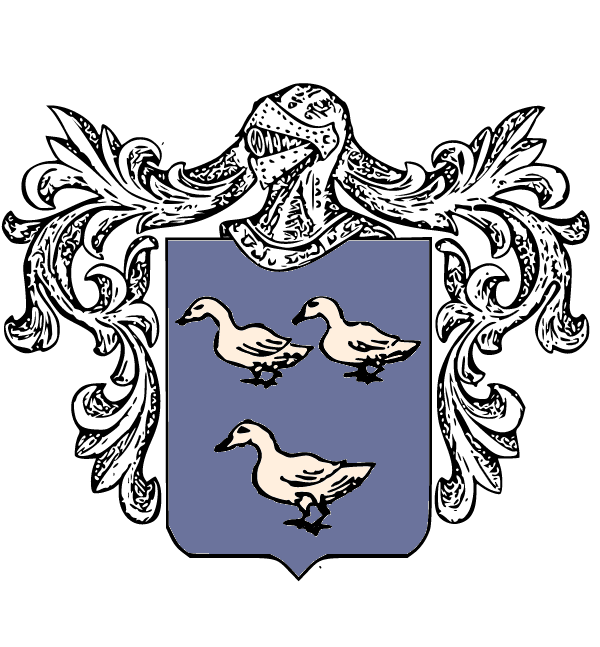
Arms of Van den Eynde

Jan van den Eynde later became one of the richest men in Naples, and a popular figure in the Southern Italian city. He entertained the viceroys and developed strong ties with the Italian nobility. Van den Eynde acquired the Palazzo Zevallos Stigliano in 1653. He restored the palace and filled it with a sizable collection of paintings. Van den Eynde was an avid art collector, and he put together one the largest collections of paintings in the napoletano. In the late 17th century Van den Eynde purchased a peerage title for his son Ferdinand. Thus, his son became the first Marquess of Castelnuovo. Van den Eynde married his two daughters (Giovanna and Caterina) to the heirs of two prominent local noble families (de Gennaro and Mastrilli). He imposed on his grandsons and heirs of the two noble houses to append his last name to their own, which they did.

Ferdinand, 1st Marquess of Castelnuovo, further enlarged the collection of the Palazzo Zevallos, and built the sumptuous Palazzo Vandeneynden, today known as Villa Carafa, in Vomero. Ferdinand married Olimpia Piccolomini, of the House of Piccolomini, a niece of Cardinal Celio Piccolomini. He had three daughters by her: Catherine, Giovanna van den Eynde, Princess of Sonnino, and Elisabeth van den Eynde, Princess of Belvedere. Ferdinand died of consumption in 1674, the same year as his father Jan.

His daughter Giovanna inherited the largest part of the Van den Eynde's fortune. She married Giuliano Colonna, member of the House of Colonna, one of the most notable Italian noble families. As a result of the marriage, Colonna acquired the Van den Eynde's riches. This allowed him to draw attention to himself and boost his position In Naples after his move there. (Note: Giuliano Colonna was the founder of the Colonna branch in Naples) Two years after his marriage to Van den Eynde, Colonna was selected by the King of Naples as ambassador to the pope for the traditional presentation of the chinea. In the following decades, the Colonna firmly established themselves in Naples. Van den Eynde's and Colonna's grandson Marcantonio went on to become viceroy of Sicily.

Ferdinand's younger daughter, Princess Elisabeth, married Carlo Carafa, 3rd Prince of Belvedere, 6th Marquess of Anzi. The Carafa were at the time one of the most powerful Italian families together with the Colonna. Thanks to his marriage to Elisabeth, Carafa acquired the Palazzo Vandeneynden in Vomero, which thereafter became known as Villa Carafa of Belvedere.

=== Antwerp Van den Eynde ===
In Antwerp, some people named Van den Eynde became prominent in the art world. However, their connection (if any) to the Van den Eynde described above remains unclear. None of them entered the peerage, and none of them is reported to have displayed a similar coat of arms.

Jan Van den Eynde II was a wealthy architect and entrepreneur. Although he was born into a wealthy family to begin with, he managed to augment his assets through his own business.

In the late 17th century, the Van den Eynde became one of the most prominent families of sculptors in Antwerp. They formed the informal Quellinus-Verbrugghen-Willemssens-Scheemaeckers-Van den Eynde consortium, which secured itself monopoly on the sculpture market in Antwerp. Collaboration among the workshops of the aforesaid families in the late 17th century, might be the main factor to account for the intricate "unity of style and approaches that have made disentangling of hands particularly difficult for art historians."

Among the Van de Eynde artists and art dealers who became prominent in Antwerp in the 17th century, there are:

- Cornelis van den Eynde (1586 – 1664), architect-entrepreneur, sculptor
- Sebastiaen van den Eynde, sculptor, son of the above
- Jan van den Eynde I (1592 – 1636), architect-entrepreneur, uncle of the above
- Huibrecht van den Eynde, sculptor, brother of the above
- Norbertus van den Eynde, sculptor, father-in-law of Jan Pauwel Gillemans the Younger and son of the above
- Martinus van den Eynde
- Franciscus van den Eynde, art dealer, poet, philosopher, teacher of Baruch Spinoza

Jan van den Eynde II was Cornelis' son.

Several Van den Eynde rose to power throughout the early modern period in the region of Antwerp. In the late 18th century, Thomas Van den Eynde became a powerful pensionary of Mechelen and its province.

== Coat of arms ==
The coat of arms consists of three ducks argent on a field of blue (In blauw drie eendjes van zilver).

== Gallery ==
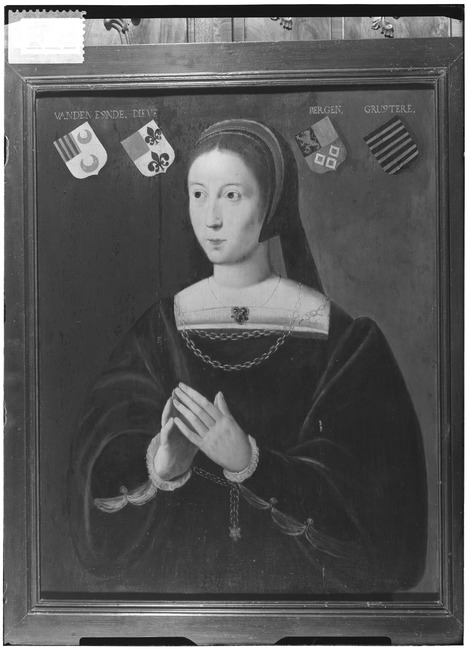
Jacoba van den Eynde, ca. 1500

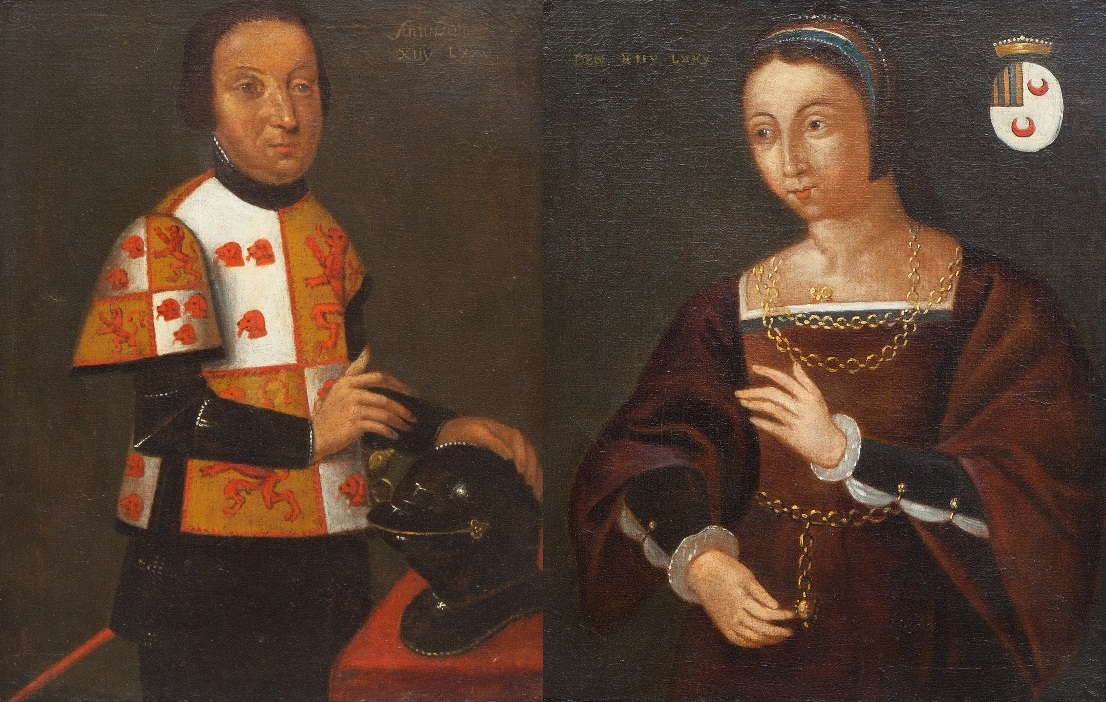
Jacoba van den Eynde and Jacob van Serooskerke

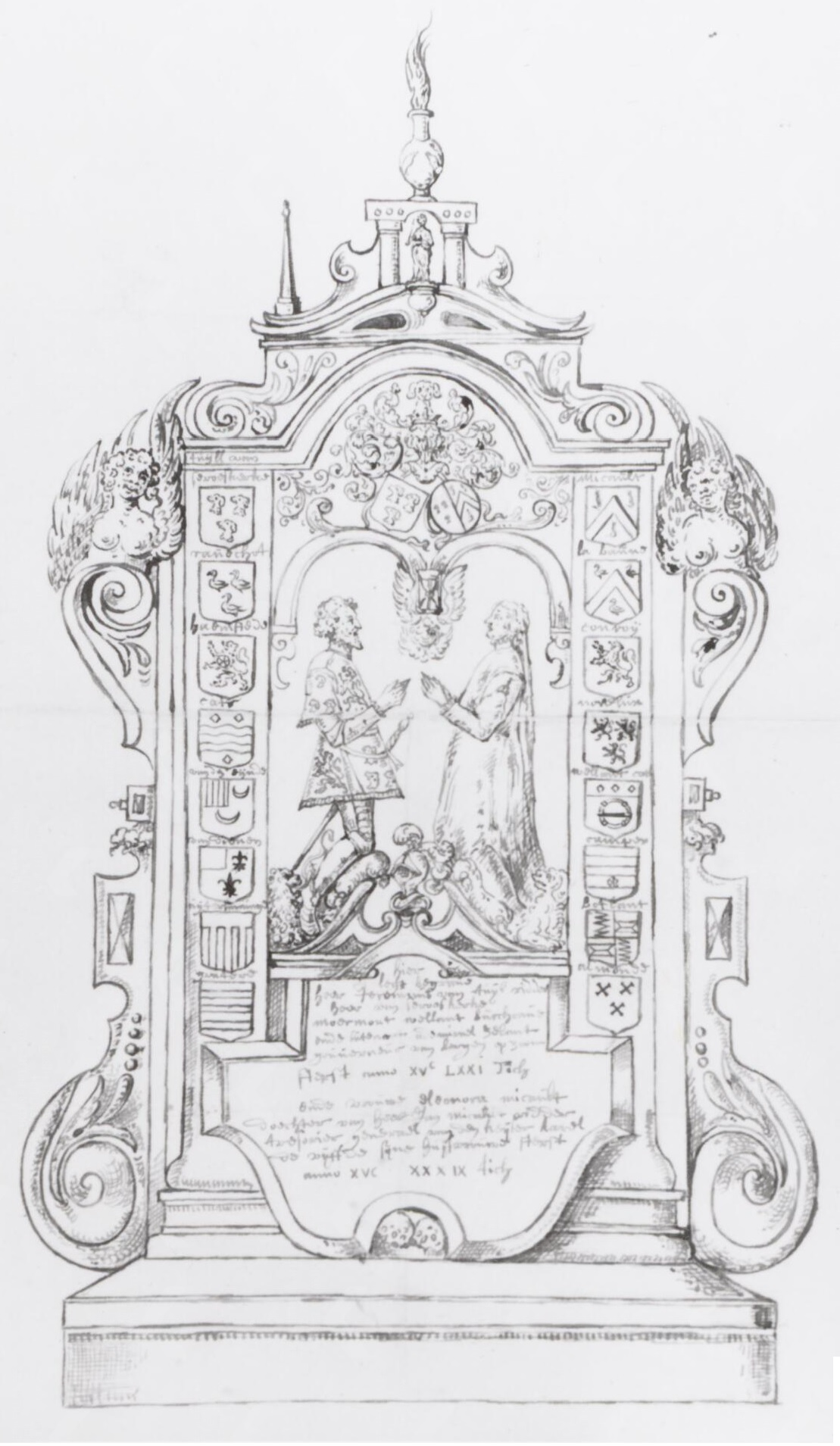
Cenotaph of Jeronimus van Serooskerke (1500–1571) and Eleonora Micault (1513–1552) in the Sint-Gertrudiskerk in Bergen op Zoom

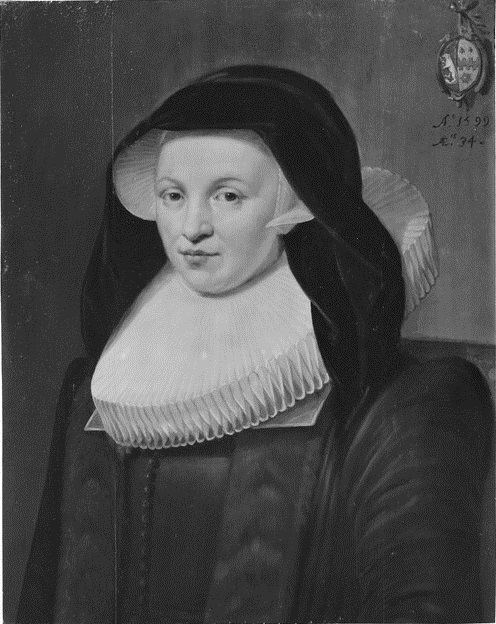
Emerentia van den Eynde, consort of Willem van Beveren, Dordrecht, early 17th century

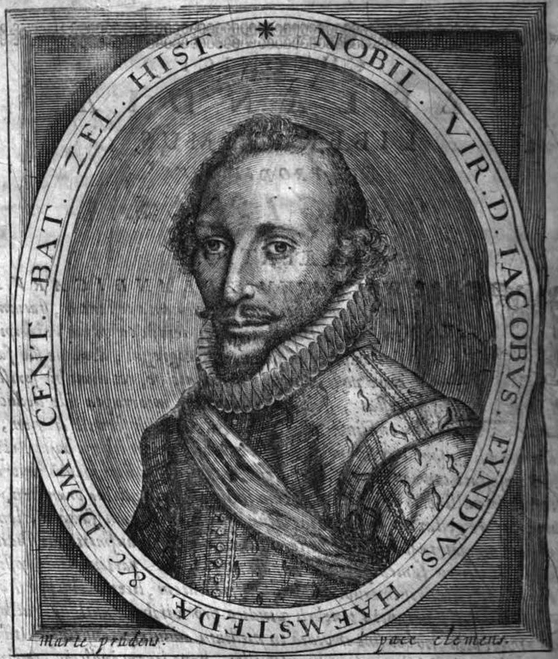
Jhr. Jacob van den Eynde, Lord of Haamstede, son of Jhr. Jacob van den Eynde

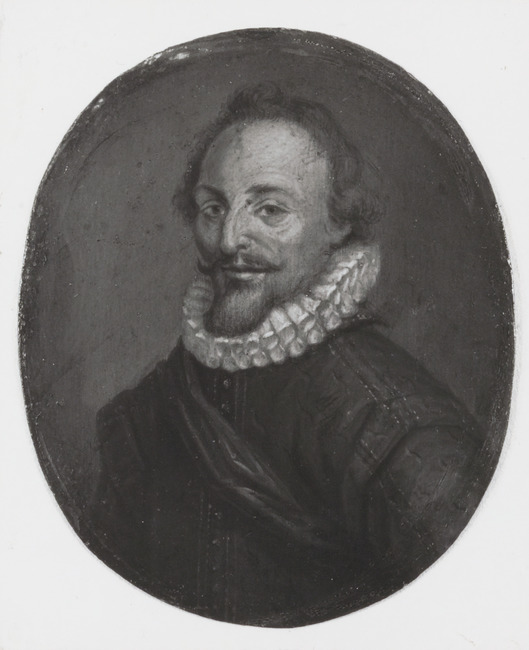
Jacob van den Eynde

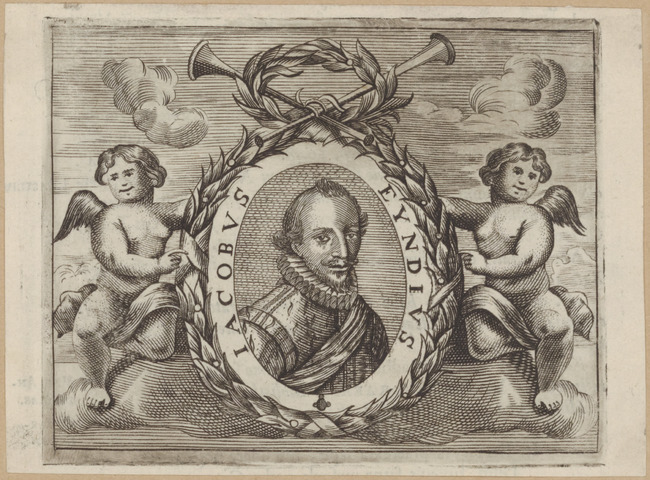
Jacob van den Eynde

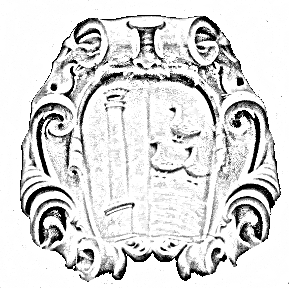
Van den Eynde and Colonna coat of arms

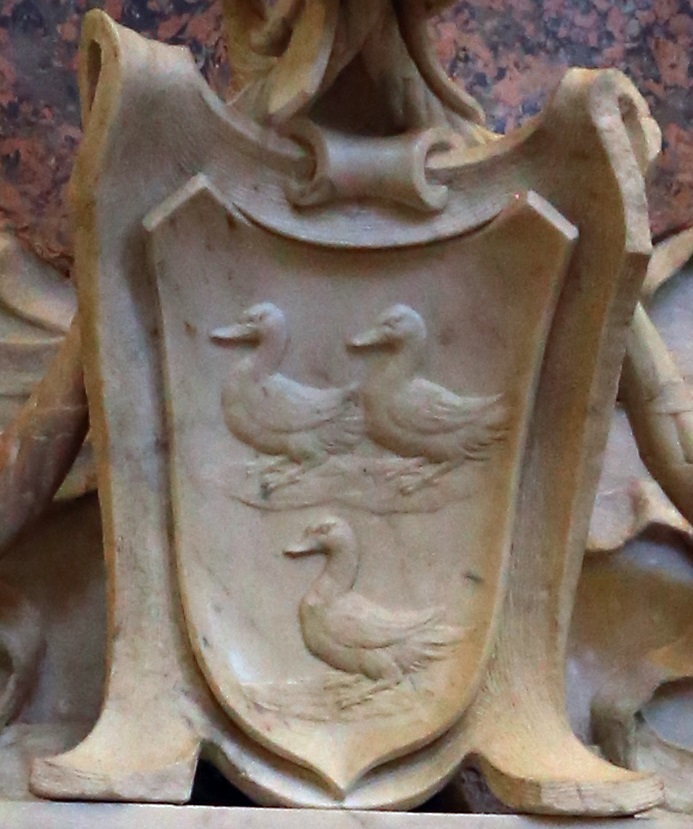
Van den Eynde coat of arms in Rome

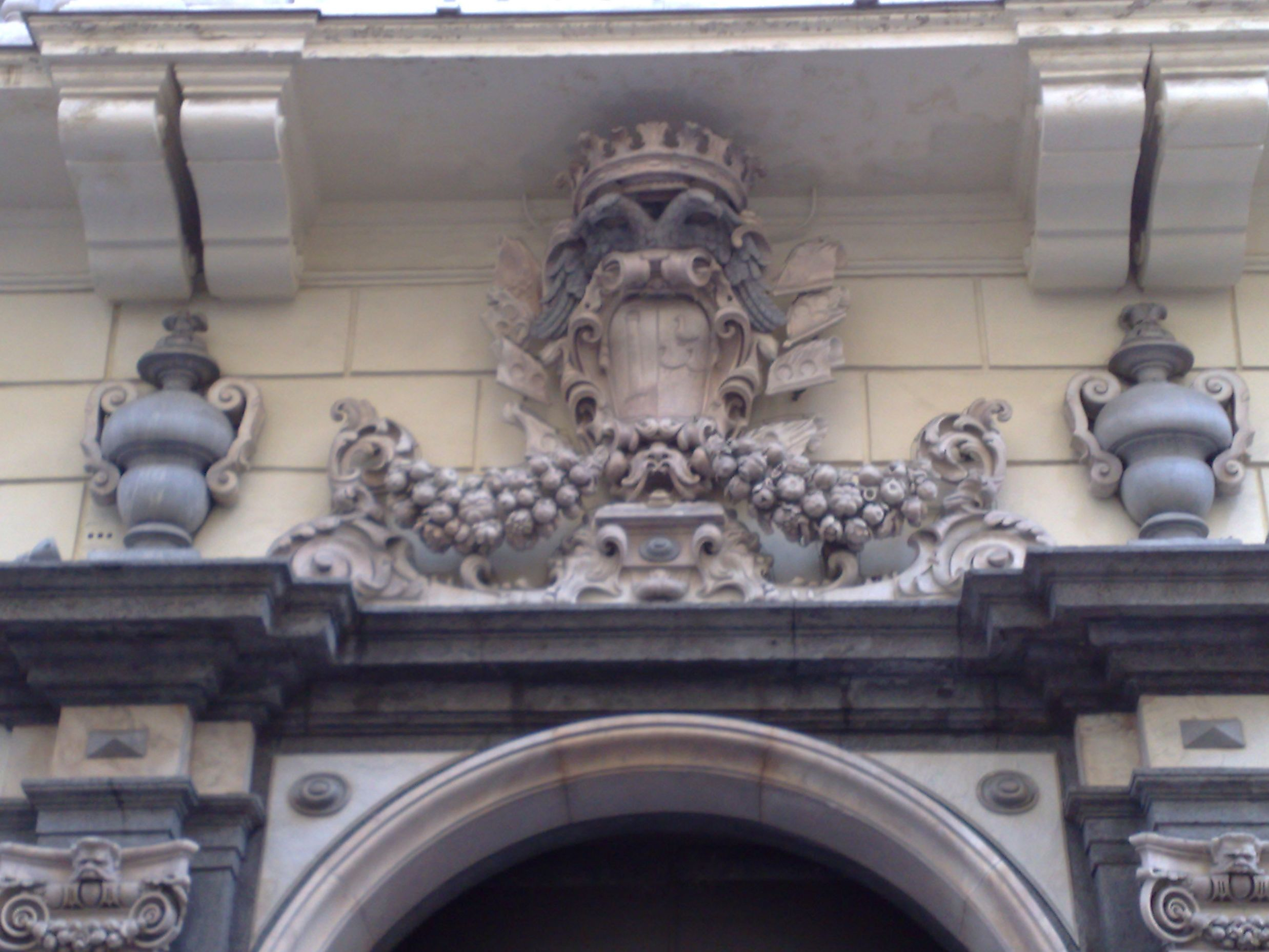
Van den Eynde and Colonna coat of arms above the gate of Palazzo Zevallos in Naples

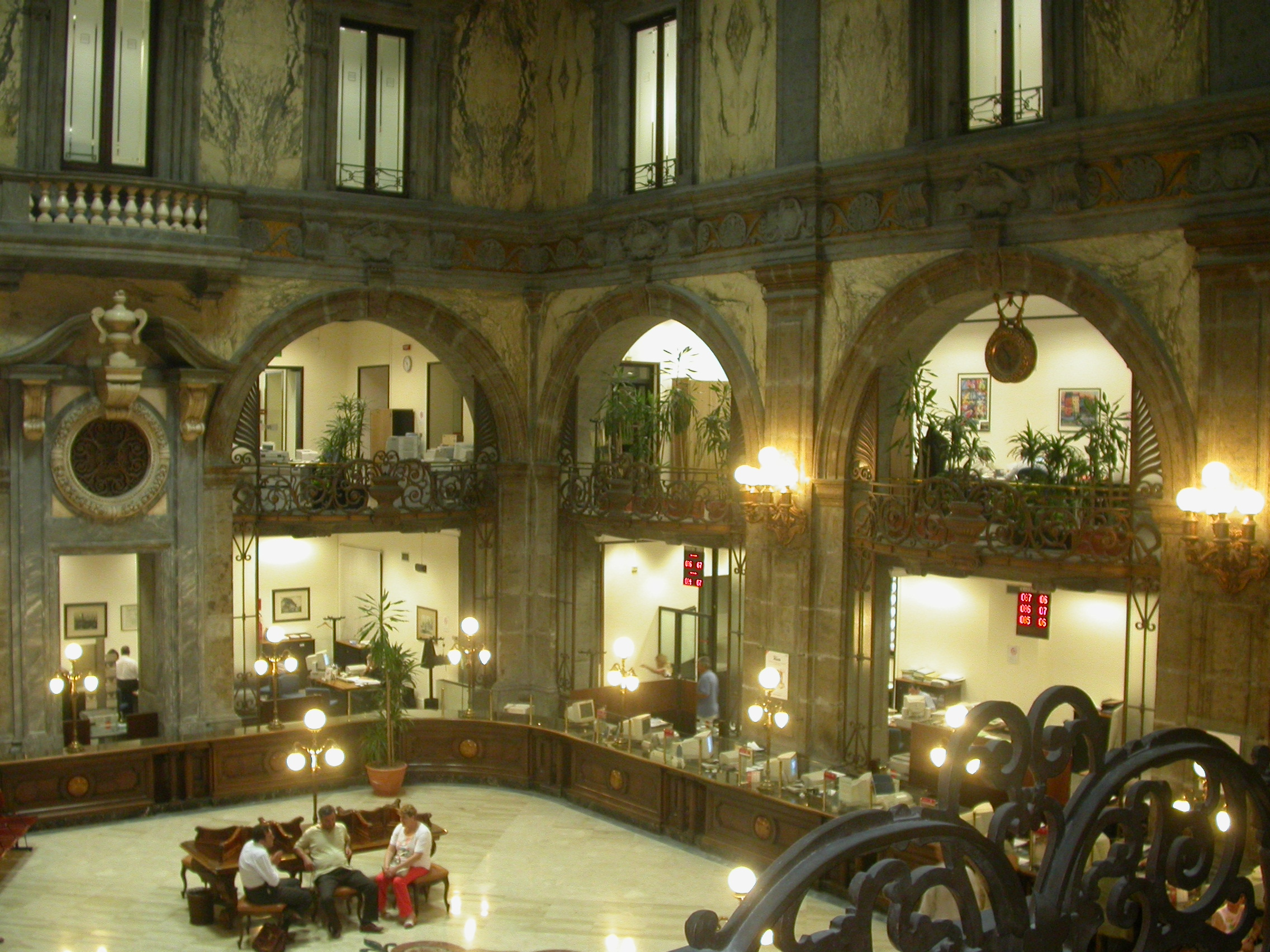
Palazzo Zevallos, interior court

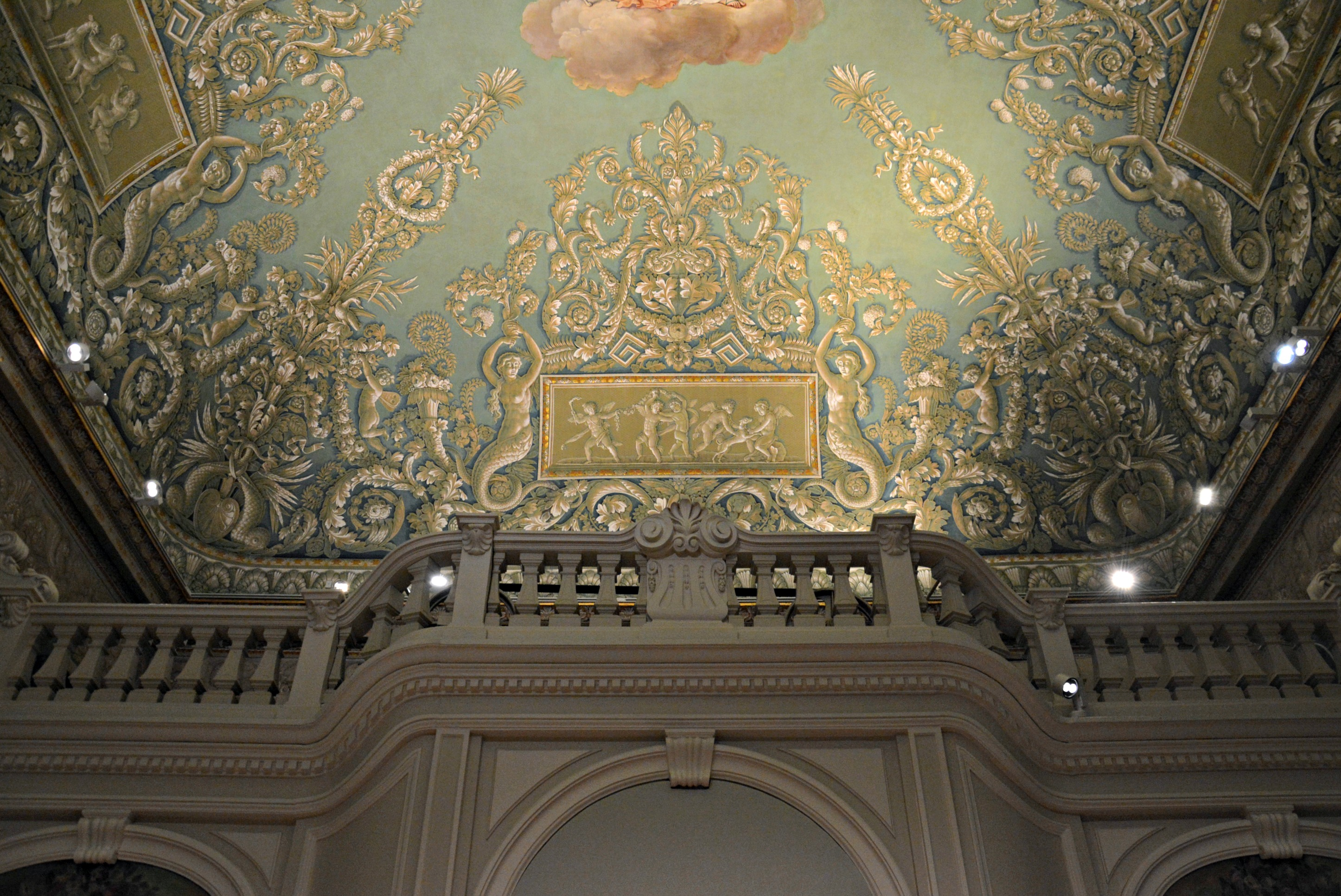
Palazzo Zevallos, ceiling

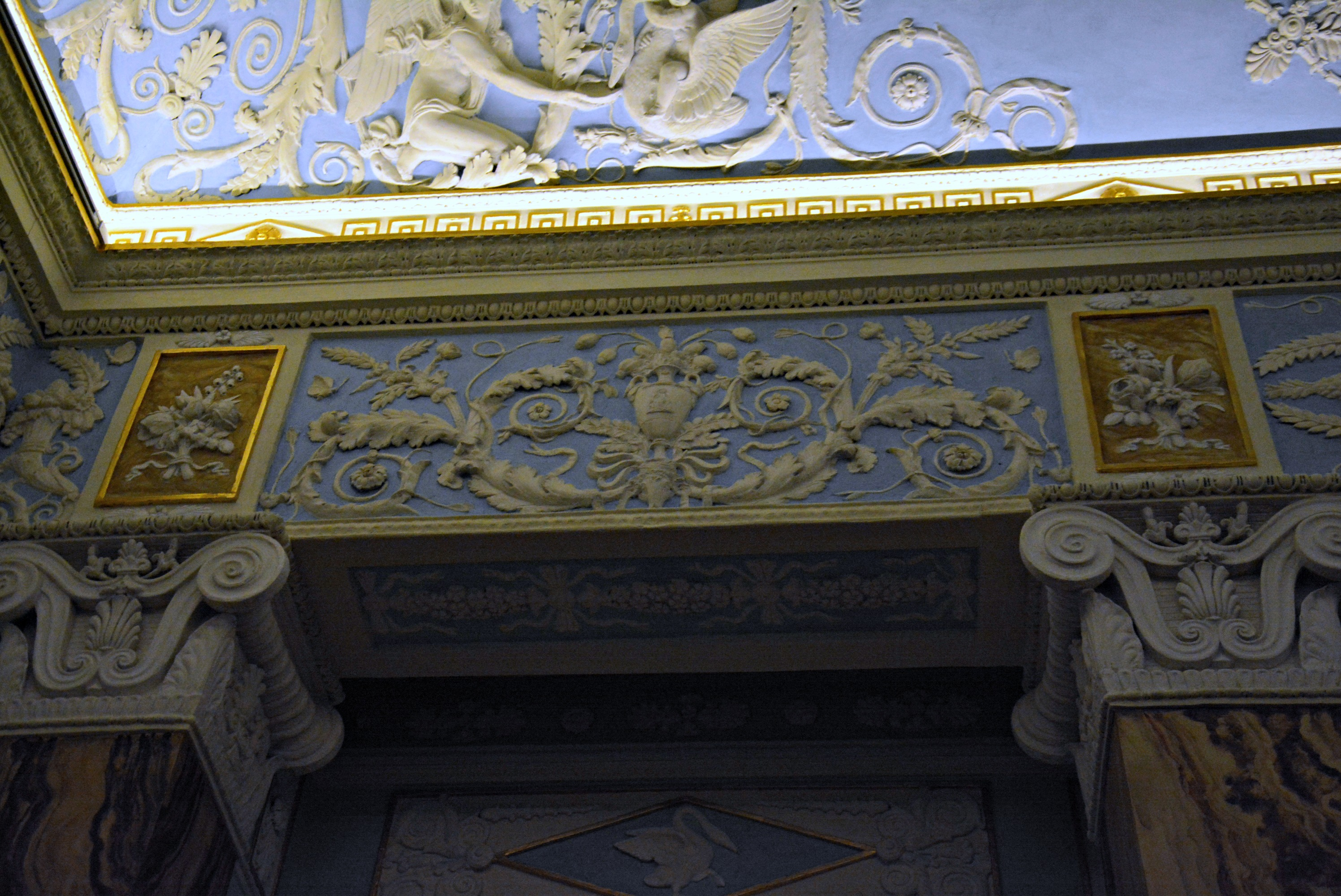
Palazzo Zevallos, pillars

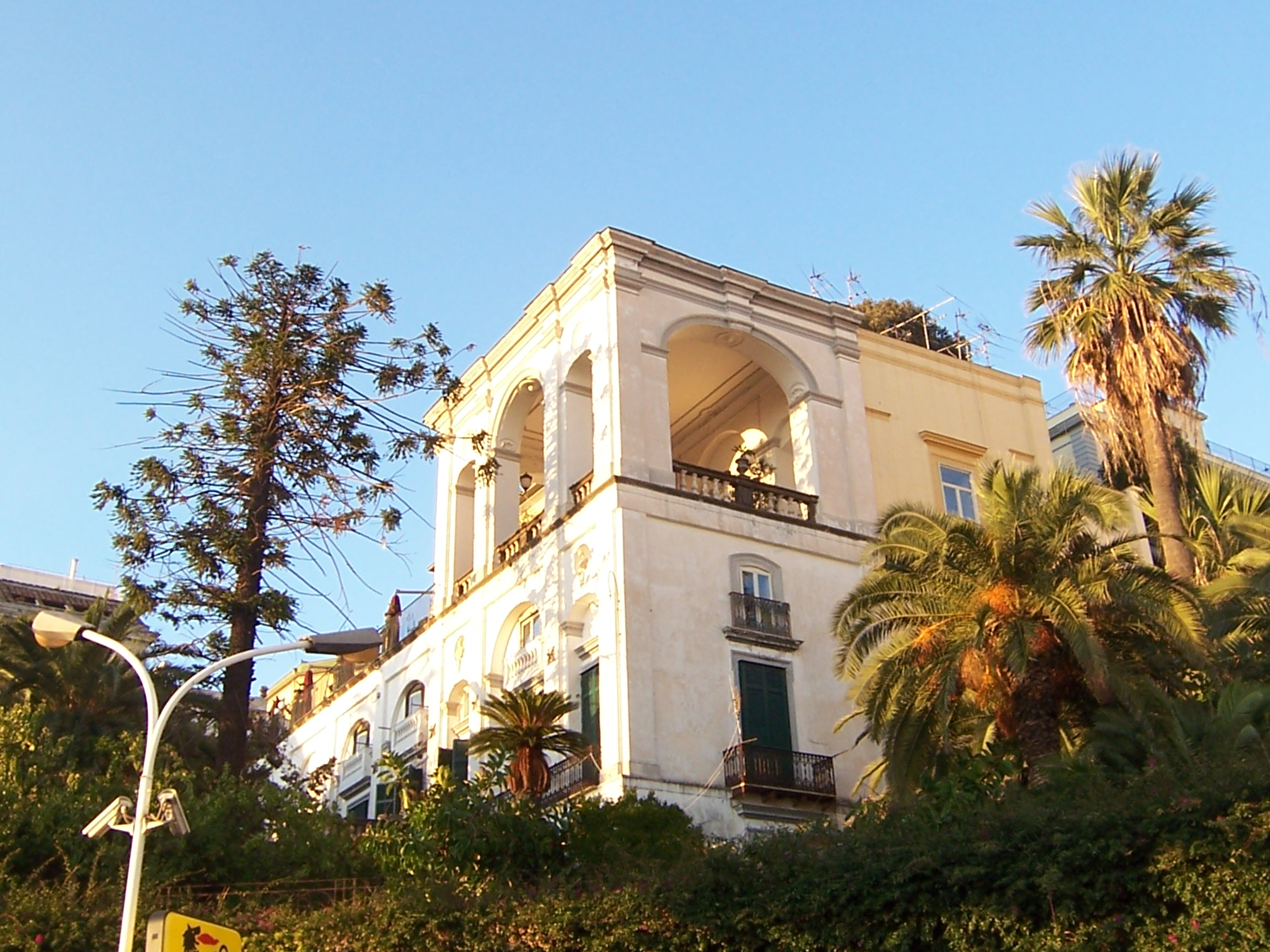
Villa Carafa of Belvedere, once Palazzo Vandeneynden in Naples

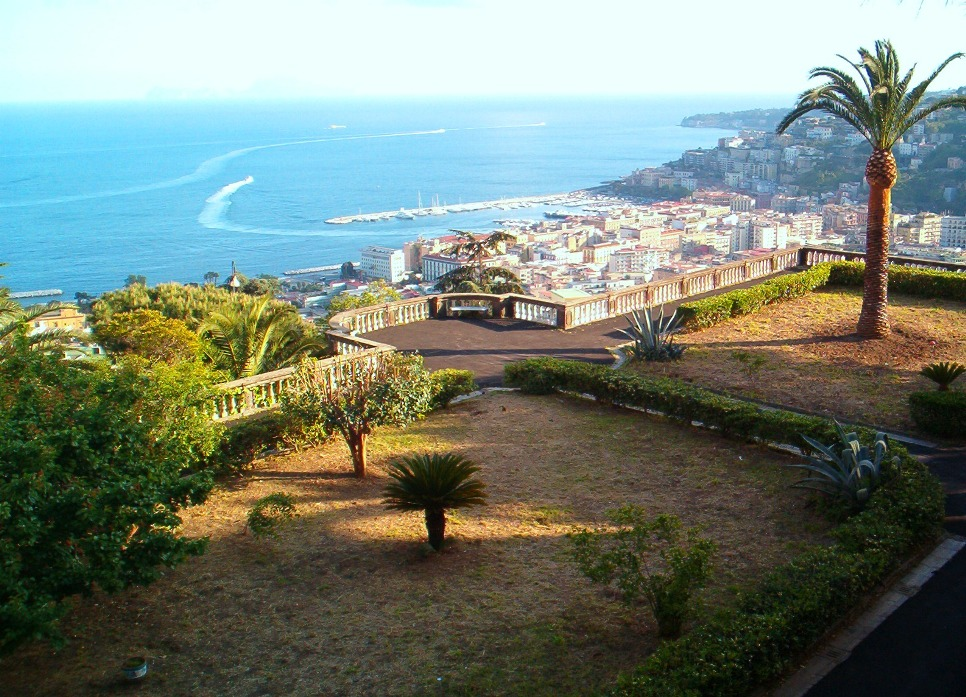
Terrace of Villa Carafa of Belvedere

== Sources ==
- Ruotolo, Renato (1982). Mercanti-collezionisti fiamminghi a Napoli: Gaspare Roomer e i Vandeneynden. Massa Lubrense Napoli - Scarpati. pp. 5–55.
- Stoesser, Alison (2018). Tra Rubens e van Dyck: i legami delle famiglie de Wael, Vandeneynden e Roomer. pp. 1–49.
- G.Porzio, G.J. van der Sman (2018). 'La quadreria Vandeneynden' 'La collezione di un principe'. A. Denunzio. pp. 1–76.
- Lawrence, Cynthia (2003). "Eynde, van den family". Oxford Art Online. Oxford Art Online. doi:10.1093/gao/9781884446054.article.T027223. ISBN 978-1-884446-05-4.
- "Flemish sculpture: Art and manufacture c.1600-1750" (PDF). University College London: 19, 28, 33, 50, 66, 90, 93, 185, 192, 193, 196, 199, 205, 211, 251, 252, 258, 271. 2008.
