= Belshazzar's Feast (Preti) =

Painting by Mattia Preti

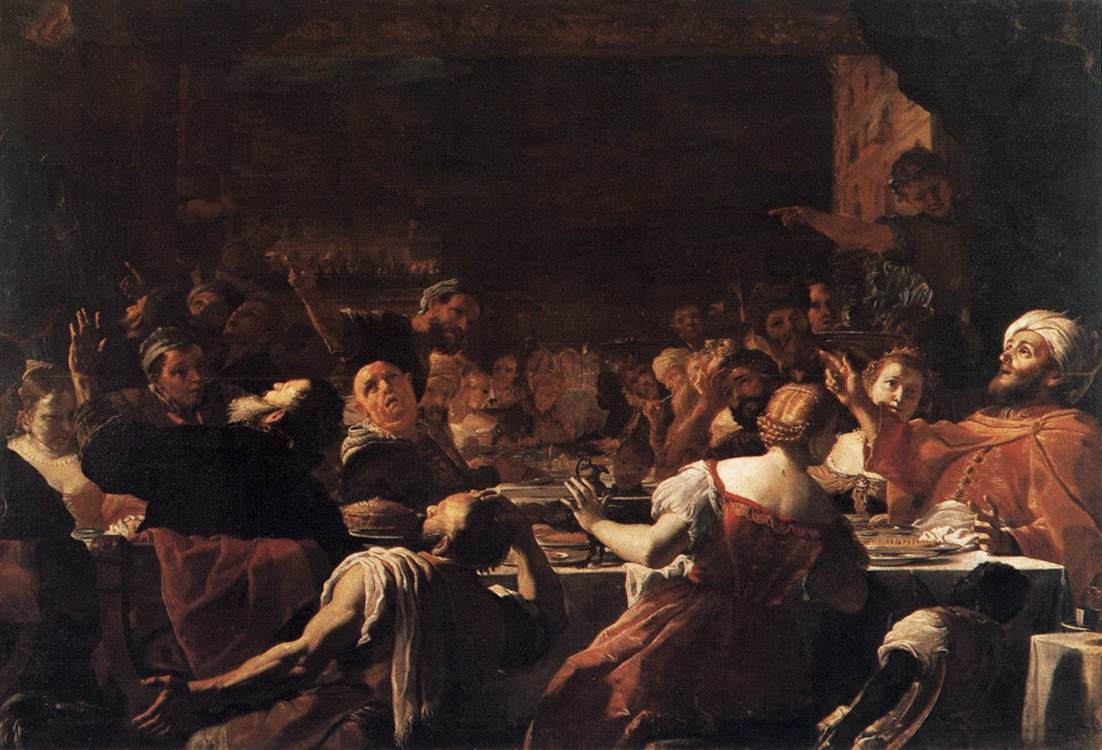
Belshazzar's Feast (c. 1660-1665) by Mattia Preti

Belshazzar's Feast is a circa 1660-1665 oil on canvas painting by Mattia Preti, now in the Museo nazionale di Capodimonte in Naples. It shows a scene from chapter 5 of the Book of Daniel.

== History ==
Banquets were a common motif in Preti's later work, having seen Peter Paul Rubens' The Feast of Herod in the Roomer collection in Naples and then in the Vandeneynden collection. The painting was first mentioned in the historical record by Bernardo De Dominici, who saw it in the Sanseverino family collection in Naples alongside other works by Preti such as The Banquet of Absalom (now also in the Museo de Capodimonte) and David Playing His Harp Before Saul (now in a private collection in New York). It was then recorded after 1745 in the Colonna di Stigliano family collection, probably after being in the Vandeneynden collection, which was merged into the Colonna di Stigliano collection when Ferdinand van den Eynde's daughter Giovanna married Giuliano Colonna of Stigliano in 1688 (she also inherited Palazzo Zevallos from her father, renamed Palazzo Colonna di Stigliano after her marriage). The Italian state bought it and Absalom from Cecilia Colonna di Stigliano (granddaughter of Andrea Colonna di Stigliano, 1st Prince of Stigliano, himself grandson of Ferdinando Colonna of Stigliano, 2nd Prince of Sonnino, son of Giovanna Vandeneynden) and placed them both in their current home.

== Bibliography ==
- (in Italian) Nicola Spinosa, Mattia Preti. Tra Roma, Napoli e Malta, Napoli, Electa, 1999, ISBN 978-8851001292.
- (in Italian) Nicola Spinosa, Pittura del Seicento a Napoli - da Mattia Preti a Luca Giordano, natura in posa, Napoli, Arte'm, 2010.
