= Carmine Caracciolo, 5th Prince of Santo Buono =

Carmine Nicolao Caracciolo Prince of Santo Buono
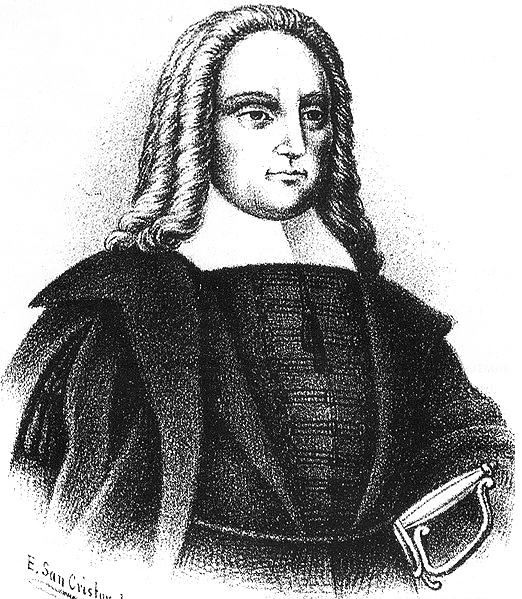
- Portrait by Evaristo San Cristóval

26th Viceroy of Peru
- In office October 5, 1716 – January 26, 1720
- Monarch: Philip V
- Preceded by: Diego Morcillo Rubio de Auñón
- Succeeded by: Diego Morcillo Rubio de Auñón

Personal details
- Born: July 5, 1671 Bucchianico, Kingdom of Naples
- Died: July 26, 1726 (aged 55) Madrid, Spain
- Spouse: Giovanna Costanza Ruffo (m. 1695; died 1715)

Carmine Nicolao Caracciolo, 5th Prince of Santo Buono, Grandee of Spain (July 5, 1671 – July 26, 1726) was Spanish Viceroy of Peru from October 5, 1716, to January 26, 1720.

== Early life ==
Caracciolo was born on July 5, 1671, in Bucchianico, Kingdom of Naples. His name was spelt several different ways, including Carmine Nicola Caracciolo, Carmine Niccolo Caracciolo, Carmine Nicolás Caracciolo and Carmino Nicolás Caracciolo. (Note: In full, Don Carmine Nicolás Caracciolo, quinto príncipe de Santo Buono, octavo duque de Castel de Sangro, duodécimo marqués de Buquianico, conde de Esquiabi, de Santobido y de Capracota, barón de Monteferrato, Castillón, Belmonte, Roca Espinalberti, Frainefrica, Grandinarca y Castelnuovo, señor de Nalbeltide y de la ciudad de Auñón, y grande de España de primera clase'.)

Caracciolo was born in 1671 in Bucchianico, Naples into an old noble family of Naples. A prince of the Holy Roman Empire, he was the son of Marino V Caracciolo, 4th Prince of Santo Buono, and his wife, Donna Giovanna Caracciolo dei Principi di Torella (both were members of the Caracciolo family by birth).

== Career ==
When his father died in 1694, he succeeded him as Prince of Santo Buono, Duke of Castel di Sangro, Marquis of Buccianico and several other titles. A cultured man of letters, he married Donna Giovanna Costanza Ruffo dei Duchi di Bagnara next year.

A supporter of the House of Bourbon, Naples send him to pay homage to King Philip V in 1701. Next year, the king appointed him ambassador extraordinary to Rome and created him Grandee of Spain. In 1704, Caracciolo passed to Venice as ordinary ambassador, a post he performed until 1711.

In 1707, when Naples passed to the Crown of Austria, his property in this country was confiscated. In 1711, he moved to Madrid. Philip V appointed him Viceroy of Peru in 1713 to replace the Marquis of Castelldosrius although he delayed some time in traveling to America. In 1715, he embarked from Cadiz to Peru with his family and a court, but unfortunately his wife died during the travel giving birth to one of his sons.

He arrived in Cartagena de Indias on the warships of the Count of Vega Florida and entered Lima on October 5, 1716. In celebration of his arrival, the poet Pedro de Peralta Barnuevo published a panegyric in his honor, as did Bermúdez de la Torre, "El sol en el zodíaco". Soon, Caracciolo became aware of the corruption in the politics and commerce of the viceroyalty. He brought with him orders from the Crown to end the French contraband, something that had been protected and encouraged by his immediate predecessors.

In 1717, the Viceroyalty of New Granada was created in northern Peru, from the Audiencias of Bogotá, Quito and Panama. However this establishment lasted only until 1724, when the territories were returned to the Viceroyalty of Peru. (The Viceroyalty of New Grenada was reestablished on a more permanent basis in 1734.)

Among the notable events of his administration were the following. He was unable to halt the contraband. During his administration missionaries made many converts in the mountains, and the College of Ocopa was founded. An epidemic affected 60,000 of the Indigenous. A royal order prohibited the branding of black slaves. Because of abuse by encomenderos of the system of mita, Caracciolo solicited its abolition. However, the king did not act on his recommendations.

On August 15, 1719, the first total eclipse of the sun recorded in Lima since the Spanish conquest occurred, just before noon. It was necessary to light house lights, and the eclipse inspired processions of penitents.

He served as viceroy until 1720.

== Personal life ==
In 1695, he married Donna Giovanna Costanza Ruffo dei Duchi di Bagnara (1679–1715), a daughter of Francesco Ruffo, 2nd Prince of Motta San Giovanni, 4th Duke of Bagnara and Giovanna Lanza (a daughter of Lorenzo II Lanza, 5th Count of Mussomeli). Before her death during childbirth, they were the parents of:

- Marino VI Caracciolo, 6th Prince of Santo Buono (1696–1745), who married Lavinia Ludovica Boncompagni, a daughter of Gregorio II Boncompagni, 5th Duke of Sora and Princess Ippolita Ludovisi.
- Giovanna Irene Caracciolo (1697–1721), who married Victor Amadeus Ferrero Fieschi, 5th Prince of Maserano, a son of Carlo Besso Ferrero Fieschi, Prince of Maserano and Cristina Ippolita of Savoy (a, recognized, natural daughter of Charles Emmanuel II, Duke of Savoy).
- Ferdinando Caracciolo, Count of Schiavi (1698–1735), an officer in the Spanish Army.
- Maria Luisa Caracciolo (1701–1766), who married Ferdinando Colonna, 2nd Prince of Sonnino, the son of Giuliano Colonna, 1st Prince of Sonnino, and Giovanna van den Eynde (a daughter of the 1st Marquess of Castelnuovo).
- Giulia Litteria Caracciolo (1705–1756), who married Francesco Gonzaga, 1st Duke of Solferino, son of Ferdinando II Gonzaga, 5th Prince of Castiglione and Laura Pico (a daughter of Alessandro II Pico, 2nd Duke of Mirandola).
- Enrichetta Caracciolo (1707–1784), who married Giacomo Francesco Milano Franco of Aragon, 2nd Prince of Ardore, (Note: His name is sometimes noted as Jacques-François Milano Franco-Arragon, 2nd Prince of Ardore.) a son of Giovanni Domenico Milano Franco of Aragon, 6th Marquess of San Giorgio and Aloisia Milano Franco Gioeni (a daughter of Girolamo Gioeni, 4th Duke of Angio).
- Giuseppa Antonia Caracciolo (1708–1772), who married Paolo Fernando de Mendoza y Alarcon, Marquess of the Valle Siciliana e di Rende, a son of Gennaro Fernando de Mendoza y Alarcon and Lucrezia Ruffo (a daughter of Carlo Ruffo, 3rd Duke of Bagnara).
- Giovanni Costanzio Caracciolo (1715–1780), the Cardinal-Deacon of San Cesareo in Palatio and Sant'Eustachio.
- Filippo Luigi Caracciolo (1713–1777), who married Maria Eleonora Caracciolo, 4th Princess of Villa Santa Maria, a daughter of Filippo Caracciolo, Duke of Gesso and Vittoria Piccolomini of Aragon (a daughter of Giuseppe Piccolomini of Aragon, 2nd Prince of Valle).

He died in Madrid, on July 26, 1726.

=== Descendants ===
Through his daughter Giovanna Irene, he was a grandfather of Victor Philip Ferrero Fieschi, Prince of Masserano, the Spanish Ambassador to the United Kingdom.

Through his daughter Maria Luisa, he was a grandfather of Marcantonio Colonna of Stigliano, 3rd Prince of Sonnino, the Viceroy of Sicily.

== Notes ==
Government offices
| Preceded by Diego Morcillo Rubio de Auñón | Viceroy of Peru; 1716–1720 | Succeeded by Diego Morcillo Rubio de Auñón |
