= Giuseppe Pascaletti =

Italian painter

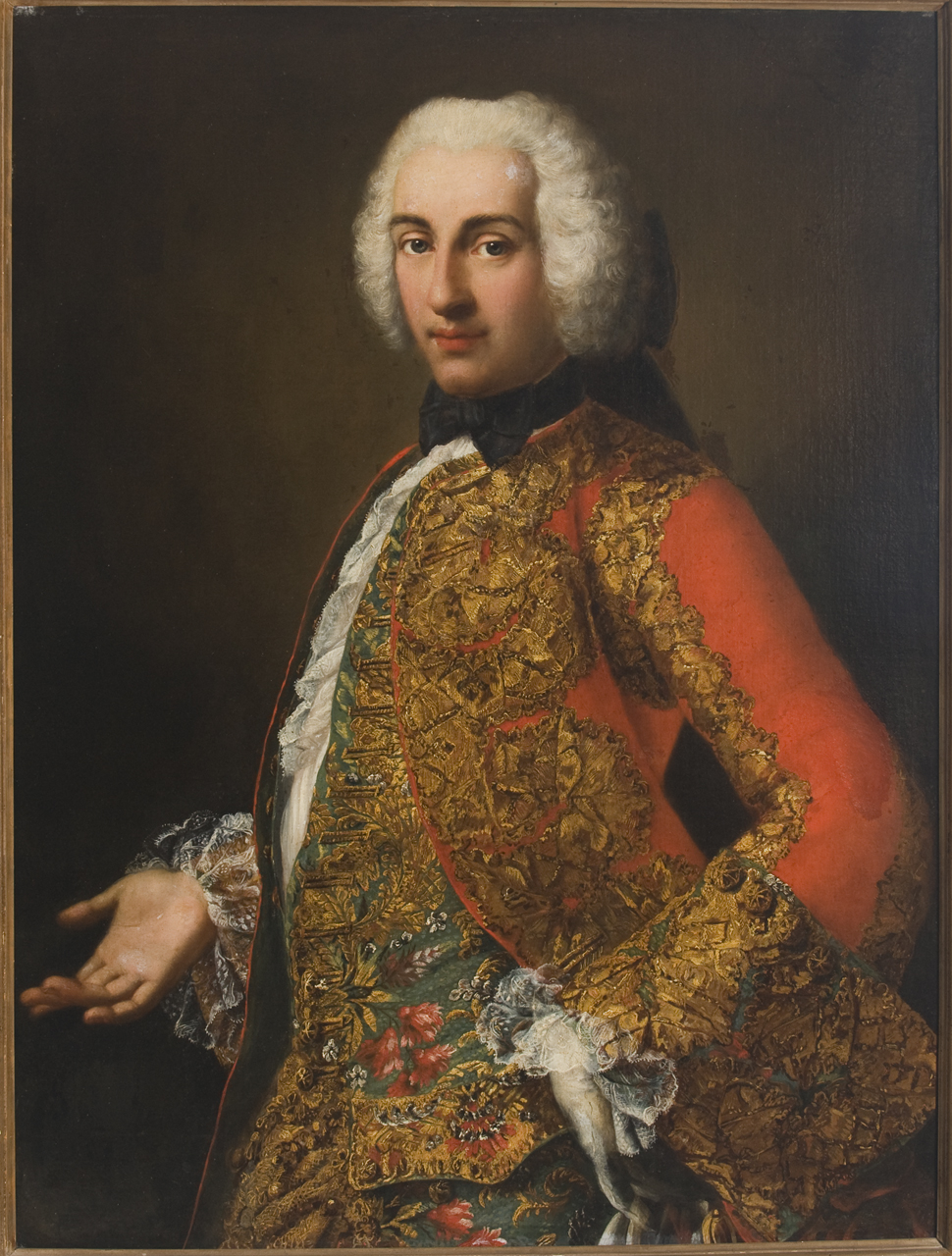
Marcantonio Colonna di Stigliano, painted by Giuseppe Pascaletti, Museum Correale

Giuseppe Pascaletti (24 February 1699 – 30 August 1757) was an Italian painter. He was born in Fiumefreddo Bruzio, in what is now Calabria (then part of the Kingdom of Naples). Pascaletti was active mostly in Rome in the Papal States and in the Cosentino in the Kingdom of Naples. He became a portraitist for the Roman nobility, and today is considered one of Cosentino's most prominent painters of the 18th century.

The noblewoman Lucrezia Ruffo Della Valle took the young painter under her protection. She sent Pascaletti to Naples, where he studied under Francesco Solimena. Pascaletti moved to Rome in 1727, where he was to remain for the next twenty years. In Rome, Pascaletti joined the academy of Virtuosi al Pantheon, and associated with Sebastiano Conca. In the early 18th century, Pascaletti painted three notable portraits for the nobility, namely, Giuliano Colonna of Stigliano, I principe of Sonnino, his consort, Princess Giovanna van den Eynde, and their grandson, Marcantonio Colonna, 3rd Prince of Sonnino. The portraits are currently housed at the Museum Correale of Sorrento.

Pascaletti moved back to Calabria in the mid-18th century, where he worked for many churches in several Calabrian towns and cities, including Fuscaldo, Falconara Albanese, Rende, Mendicino and San Lucido. Pascaletti was also active in his hometown, Fiumefreddo Bruzio, where he married Teresa De Ponzo in 1747. They had five children together.

He died on August 30, 1757, and was buried in the church of San Francesco di Paola in Cosenza.

== Sources ==
- Leone, Giorgio; De Rose, Edvige (2007). Giuseppe Pascaletti (1699-1757). Rubbettino. ISBN 978-88-498-1965-6.
