= Ferdinando Colonna of Stigliano, 2nd Prince of Sonnino =

Ferdinando Colonna
- Prince of Sonnino
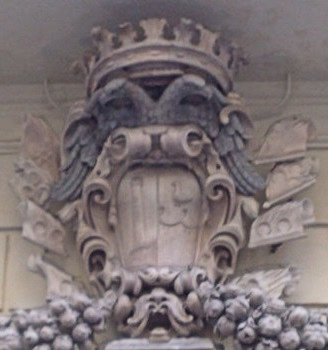
- Arms of the unified Colonna (left) and Van den Eynde (right) above the gate of Palazzo Zevallos. Ferdinando was the son of Giuliano Colonna and Giovanna van den Eynde
- Born: 21 September 1695; Naples
- Died: 24 February 1775 (aged 79); Naples
- Noble family: House of Colonna
- Spouse: Luisa Caracciolo
- Issue: Marcantonio Colonna
- Father: Giuliano Colonna
- Mother: Giovanna van den Eynde

Ferdinando Colonna, 2nd Prince of Sonnino and 3rd Marquess of Castelnuovo (Grande de España) (21 September 1695 – 24 February 1775) was an Italian nobleman of the House of Colonna. He was Prince of Sonnino, Marquess of Castelnuovo, Grandee of Spain, Knight of the Order of Saint Januarius and Papal Master of the Horse.

== Early life ==
Ferdinando was born in Naples on 21 September 1695. He was the third son of Giuliano Colonna of Stigliano, son of Clelia Cesarini and Filippo Colonna, and Giovanna van den Eynde, daughter of Olimpia Piccolomini and Ferdinand van den Eynde, 1st Marquess of Castelnuovo, after whom he was named.

== Career ==
Although not his parents' firstborn son, with the entry of his elder brother Girolamo into the Knights of Malta in 1714, and the death of the firstborn Lorenzo in 1715, he suddenly found himself in the position of heir apparent.

Ferdinand would go on to become Gentleman of the Chamber of the King of Naples in 1734, Knight of the Order of Saint Januarius in 1738, Papal Master of the Horse the same year, and Grandee of Spain in 1764.

== Personal life ==
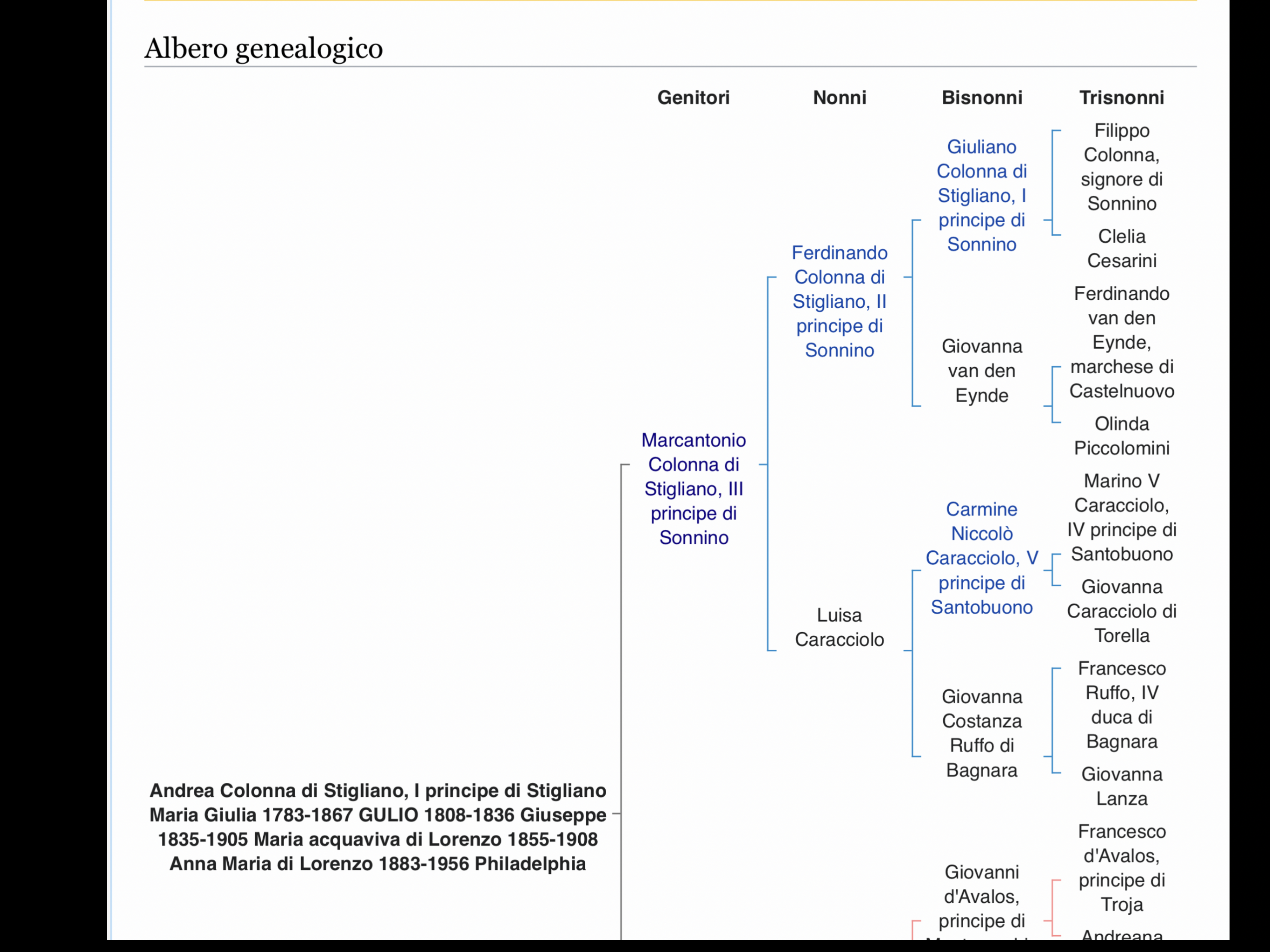
MARIA GIULIA COLONNA 1783-1867, descendent of Marcantonio Colonna

He married Maria Luisa Caracciolo (1701–1766), a daughter of Carmine Caracciolo, 5th Prince of Santo Buono and Donna Giovanna Costanza Ruffo dei Duchi di Bagnara. Together, they were the parents of:

- Marcantonio Colonna (1724–1796), who served as the Viceroy of the Kingdom of Sicily as well as Captain general of the latter; he married Giulia d'Avalos di Celenza di Stigliano.

Ferdinand died in Naples on February 24, 1775.

Italian nobility
Preceded by Johanna van den Eynde	Marquess of Castelnuovo; 1716–1775	Succeeded by Marcantonio Colonna
Preceded by Giuliano Colonna	Prince of Sonnino; 1732–1775	Succeeded by Marcantonio Colonna
