= Marquess of Castelnuovo =

Title in Neapolitan nobility

Marquessate of Castelnuovo
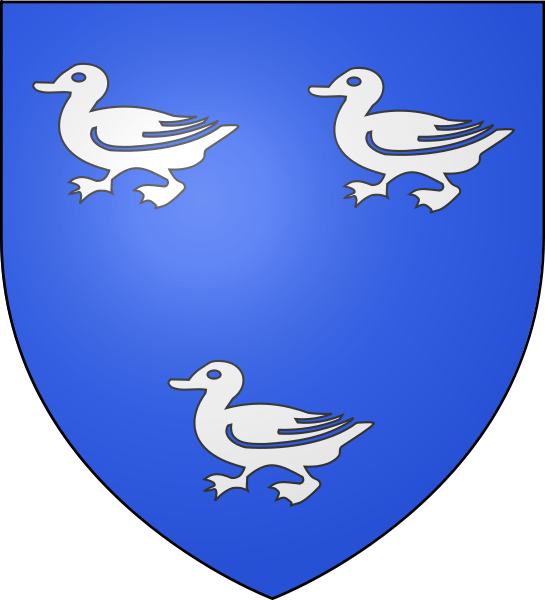
- Arms of Van den Eynde
- Creation date: 1660
- Created by: Philip IV of Spain
- Peerage: Spanish nobility
- First holder: Ferdinand van den Eynde, 1st Marquess of Castelnuovo
- Last holder: Lorenzo Filippo Colonna
- Status: Extinct
- Extinction date: 1948
- Former seat: Palazzo Zevallos Stigliano

Marquess of Castelnuovo (Italian: Marchese di Castelnuovo, Spanish: Marqués de Castelnuovo) was a title in the Neapolitan nobility, at the time part of the Spanish peerage. It was created in the late 17th century for Ferdinand van den Eynde, 1st Marquess of Castelnuovo. The marquessate was purchased by the Flemish magnate Jan van den Eynde, at the time one of the wealthiest men in the city of Naples, for his son Ferdinand. Ferdinand married Olimpia Piccolomini, of the House of Piccolomini, by whom he had three daughters. Thanks to the marriage of his heir apparent Giovanna to Giuliano Colonna, the title was inherited by Giovanna's son, Ferdinando Colonna. The title was held for nine generations by the Colonna, before losing statutory regulation and lawful recognition together with all the other Italian peerage titles) upon the establishment of the Italian Republic, wherein aristocratic titles are neither recognized nor protected, (Note: After the fall of Fascist Italy and the other Axis powers, the abolition of monarchy (via referendum), the establishment of the Italian Republic and the enactment of the 1948 constitution, nobility and aristocratic titles officially ceased to exist in Italy. The banishment has been reiterated and expanded several times in the history of the Republic. For example, in 1964 the Corte di Cassazione ruled that "the prohibition of recognition of noble titles does not only concern the necessary judicial or administrative activity [...] but it also implies that noble titles do not constitute content of right and, more broadly, do not retain any relevance: in a word, they remain outside the legal world." In 1971, the Corte di Cassazione ruled that "noble titles, as such, can't have any meaning or value (assumere rilevanza) as distinctive traits of personal identity." Aristocratic titles are not lawfully recognized or protected in Italy, and they can't be used as a means of identification. They "do not fall within the object of the right to personal identity understood as the right of each individual to be acknowledged in the real world of attributes, qualities, characters, actions that distinguish them from any other individual.") peerage titles having "no value whatsoever" outside that of any other sobriquet.

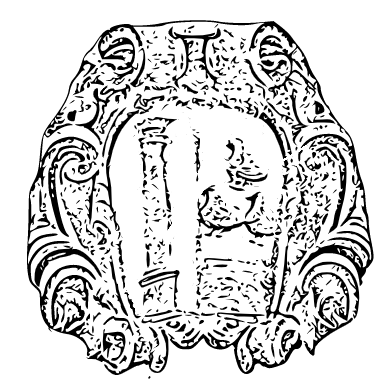
Arms of Colonna and Van den Eynde

== History ==
It was created in the late 17th century for the wealthy Flemish merchant Ferdinand van den Eynde. His father Jan van den Eynde, a Fleming from Antwerp who had become one of the wealthiest men in Naples through trading and banking, purchased the title for him. A few years earlier, Jan van den Eynde had purchased the Palazzo Zevallos, which he renovated and filled with a huge art collection, which was one of the largest in Naples and its surroundings at the time. Although most of the paintings in the original Van den Eynde collection are now dispersed throughout the world (they being housed at other major museums), the reduced gallery of Palazzo Zevallos remains to this day one of the most popular in the city of Naples. Ferdinand van den Eynde married Olimpia Piccolomini, of the House of Piccolomini, by whom he had three daughters. He inherited the Palazzo Zevallos upon his father's death, and built the monumental Palazzo Vandeneynden (today Villa Carafa) in Vomero. The Villa Carafa passed to his daughter Elisabeth, while the Palazzo Zevallos, the bulk of Ferdinand's art collection, and his marquessate were inherited by his daughter Giovanna, who married Giuliano Colonna, of the House of Colonna. Giovanna and Giuliano had seven children together, with the title passing down to Ferdinando.

== Marquesses of Castelnuovo ==
- Ferdinand van den Eynde, 1st Marquess of Castelnuovo (died 1674)
- Giovanna van den Eynde, Marchioness of Castelnuovo (1688–1716)
- Ferdinando Colonna, 2nd Prince of Sonnino, 3rd Marquess of Castelnuovo (1716–1775)
- Marcantonio Colonna, 3rd Prince of Sonnino, 4th Marquess of Castelnuovo (1775–1796)
- Andrea Colonna, 3rd Prince of Stigliano, 5th Marquess of Castelnuovo (1796–1820)
- Ferdinando Colonna, 4th Prince of Stigliano, 6th Marquess of Castelnuovo (1820–1834)
- Marcantonio Colonna, 5th Prince of Stigliano, 7th Marquess of Castelnuovo (1834–1890)
- Gioacchino Colonna, 6th Prince of Stigliano, 8th Marquess of Castelnuovo (1890–1900)
- Ferdinando Colonna, 7th Prince of Stigliano, 9th Marquess of Castelnuovo (1900–1926)
- Andrea Colonna, 8th Prince of Stigliano, 10th Marquess of Castelnuovo (1934–1943)
- Lorenzo Filippo Colonna, 9th Prince of Stigliano, 11th Marquess of Castelnuovo (1943–1946)

== Sources ==
- "Libro d'Oro della Nobiltà Mediterranea". Comitato Scientifico Scientifico Editoriale del Libro d'Oro della Nobiltà Mediterranea.
- Annuario della nobiltà italiana. Giornale araldico. 1878. p. 158.
