= Diego Morcillo Rubio de Auñón =

Spanish bishop

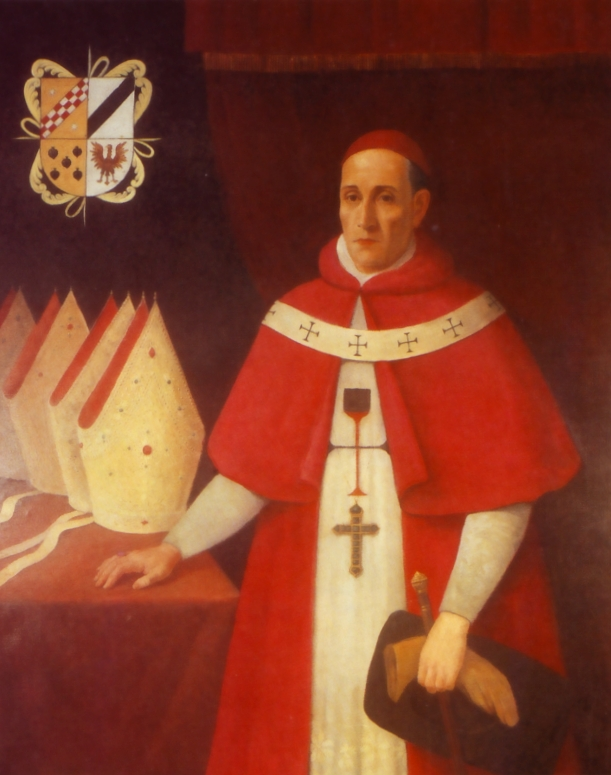
Diego Morcillo Rubio de Auñón, Archbishop of Lima, Viceroy of Peru

Fray Diego Morcillo Rubio de Auñón, O.SS.T. (sometimes Diego Morcillo Rubio de Suñón de Robledo) (January 3, 1642, Villarrobledo, Albacete, Spain – 1730, Lima, Peru) was a Spanish bishop in Peru and twice viceroy of the colony, from August 15, 1716, to October 5, 1716 (interim) and from January 26, 1720, to May 14, 1724.

== Biography ==
At a young age he entered the Calced branch of the Trinitarian Order in Toledo. He studied theology at the University of Alcalá. In Alcalá King Charles II named him preacher of the royal chamber. He also became examiner (calficador) for the Supreme Council of the Inquisition.

On November 21, 1701, he was named as bishop of the Diocese of Nicaraguaduring the papacy of Pope Clement XI and consecrated in 1703 by Juan de Argüelles, Bishop of Panamá. Continuing his ecclesiastical advancement, he was appointed by Pope Clement XI as bishop of La Paz, Bolivia on May 14, 1708, by Pope Clement XI as Archbishop of the Archdiocese of La Plata o Charcas on March 21, 1714, and finally by Pope Innocent XIII as archbishop of Lima on May 12, 1723. While bishop, he was the principal consecrator of Juan de Necolalde, Bishop of Concepción (1716); José Luis Palos Bord, Coadjutor Bishop of Paraguay (1723); José Manuel de Sarricolea y Olea, Bishop of Córdoba (1724); and Pedro Morcillo Rubio de Suñón, Auxiliary Bishop of Lima (1724).

In 1716, while he was archbishop of Charcas, King Philip V named him interim viceroy of Peru. On August 15 he entered Lima and replaced Mateo de la Mata Ponce de León, president of the Audiencia. Mata had also been serving on an interim basis, since the removal of Viceroy Diego Ladrón de Guevara on March 2, 1716. Morcillo occupied this post until October 5, 1716, when the position was taken up by Carmine Nicolao Caracciolo, Prince of Santo Buono, the official successor of Ladrón de Guevara. Morcillo then returned to his ecclesiastical duties as archbishop of Charcas.

At the end of Caracciolo's term, Morcillo once again became viceroy, this time on a permanent basis. He entered Lima and took up the office on January 26, 1720. On the death of the archbishop of Lima, Antonio de Zuloaga, he also occupied that office.

Among his political accomplishments were a great increase in royal revenues from the colony, and the repulse of the English pirates on the coast.

During this time Pope Benedict XIII elevated two important Peruvian saints, Toribio Alfonso de Mogrovejo and Francisco de Solano. Morcillo donated large sums of money to the Trinitarian Order, to charitable works such as hospitals and schools, and for a convent for Discalced Carmelites in the town of his birth.

He was recognized as intelligent and a good administrator. He wrote the book Clamores de la obligación.

In 1722, Viceroy Morcillo intervened in the Revolt of the Comuneros of Paraguay, where he stood up for Paraguay's deposed governor Reyes. Reyes had been convicted by a judge of the Royal Court of Charcas of misdeeds - but the Court had given the judge the power to succeed the governor himself, creating an obvious conflict of interest. In a series of letters with the Royal Court of Charcas, he emphasized that the choice of governor was not a judicial matter, that the judge's trial was irregular and invalid, and that Reyes should be restored to his position promptly. Partially from the strain of the affairs of being both Archbishop and Viceroy in his eighties, he retired in 1724. He died in Lima in 1730 and was interred in the crypt of the cathedral.

== External links and additional sources ==
- Cheney, David M. "Diocese of León en Nicaragua". Catholic-Hierarchy.org. (for Chronology of Bishops) ^{[self-published]}
- Chow, Gabriel. "Diocese of León (Nicaragua)". GCatholic.org. (for Chronology of Bishops) ^{[self-published]}
- Cheney, David M. "Archdiocese of La Paz". Catholic-Hierarchy.org. (for Chronology of Bishops) ^{[self-published]}
- Chow, Gabriel. "Metropolitan Archdiocese of La Paz (Bolivia)". GCatholic.org. (for Chronology of Bishops) ^{[self-published]}
- Cheney, David M. "Archdiocese of Sucre". Catholic-Hierarchy.org. (for Chronology of Bishops) ^{[self-published]}
- Chow, Gabriel. "Metropolitan Archdiocese of Sucre (Bolivia)". GCatholic.org. (for Chronology of Bishops) ^{[self-published]}
- Cheney, David M. "Archdiocese of Lima". Catholic-Hierarchy.org. (for Chronology of Bishops) ^{[self-published]}
- Chow, Gabriel. "Metropolitan Archdiocese of Lima (Peru)". GCatholic.org. (for Chronology of Bishops) ^{[self-published]}

Government offices
Preceded by Mateo de la Mata Ponce de León	Viceroy of Peru; 1716	Succeeded by Carmine Nicolao Caracciolo
Preceded by Carmine Nicolao Caracciolo	Viceroy of Peru; 1720–1724	Succeeded by José de Armendáriz
Catholic Church titles
Preceded by Nicolás Delgado	Bishop of Nicaragua; 1701–1708	Succeeded by Juan Benito Garret y Arlovi
Preceded by Nicolás Urbán de Mota y Haro	Bishop of La Paz; 1708–1714	Succeeded by Mateo Panduro y Villafaña
Preceded by Juan Queipo de Llano y Valdés (archbishop)	Archbishop of La Plata o Charcas; 1714–1723	Succeeded by Juan de Necolalde
Preceded by Antonio de Zuloaga	Archbishop of Lima; 1723–1730	Succeeded by Juan Francisco Antonio de Escandón
