= Juan Queipo de Llano y Valdés (archbishop of La Plata o Charcas) =

Spanish prelate

Most Reverend Juan Queipo de Llano y Valdés
- Archbishop of La Plata o Charcas
- Church: Catholic Church
- Diocese: Diocese La Plata o Charcas
- In office: 1680–1694
- Predecessor: Bartolomé González y Poveda
- Successor: Diego Morcillo Rubio de Auñón de Robledo
- Previous post: Bishop of La Paz (1694–1713)

Orders
- Consecration: 21 Dec 1681 by Melchor de Liñán y Cisneros

Personal details
- Born: 1635 Parroquia de Santianes de Tuña, Asturias
- Died: 1713 (age 78)

Juan Queipo de Llano y Valdés (1635–1713) was a Roman Catholic prelate who served as Archbishop of La Plata o Charcas (1680–1694) and Bishop of La Paz (1694–1713).

== Biography ==
Juan Queipo de Llano y Valdés was born in Santianes de Tuña, Spain in 1635. On 23 Sep 1680, he was appointed during the papacy of Pope Innocent XI as Bishop of La Paz. On 21 Dec 1681, he was consecrated bishop by Melchor de Liñán y Cisneros, Archbishop of Lima. On 19 Apr 1694, he was appointed during the papacy of Pope Innocent XII as Archbishop of La Plata o Charcas. He served as Archbishop of La Plata o Charcas until his death in 1713.

While bishop, he was the principal consecrator of Bartolomé González y Poveda, Archbishop of La Plata o Charcas (1686); and Luis Francisco Romero, Bishop of Santiago de Chile (1707).

== External links and additional sources ==
- Cheney, David M. "Archdiocese of La Paz". Catholic-Hierarchy.org. (for Chronology of Bishops) ^{[self-published]}
- Chow, Gabriel. "Metropolitan Archdiocese of La Paz (Bolivia)". GCatholic.org. (for Chronology of Bishops) ^{[self-published]}
- Cheney, David M. "Archdiocese of Sucre". Catholic-Hierarchy.org. (for Chronology of Bishops) ^{[self-published]}
- Chow, Gabriel. "Metropolitan Archdiocese of Sucre (Bolivia)". GCatholic.org. (for Chronology of Bishops) ^{[self-published]}

Catholic Church titles
| Preceded by Juan Pérez de Corcha | Bishop of La Paz; 1694–1713 | Succeeded by Bernardo de Carrasco y Saavedra |
| Preceded by Bartolomé González y Poveda | Archbishop of La Plata o Charcas; 1680–1694 | Succeeded by Diego Morcillo Rubio de Auñón de Robledo |
