= Giovanna van den Eynde, Princess of Sonnino =

Neapolitan noble (c. 1672–1716)

Giovanna van den Eynde
- Princess of Sonnino and Galatro
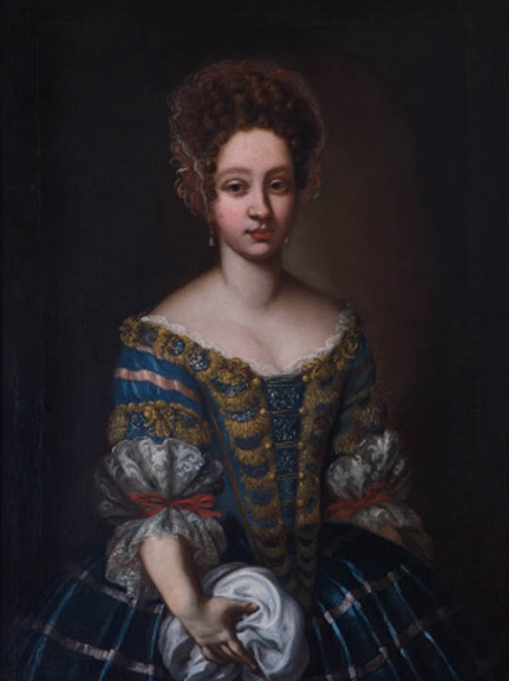
- Giovanna van den Eynde, anonymous painting, Museum Correale
- Born: c. 1672; Naples
- Died: 1716; Naples
- Noble family: Van den Eynde
- Spouse: Giuliano Colonna, 1st Prince of Sonnino
- Issue: Ferdinando Colonna, 2nd Prince of Sonnino, 3rd Marquess of Castelnuovo; Girolamo Colonna, Knight of Malta; Gennaro Colonna, Knight of Malta; Filippo Colonna; Cleria; Virgina; Lorenzo
- Father: Ferdinand van den Eynde, 1st Marquess of Castelnuovo
- Mother: Olimpia Piccolomini

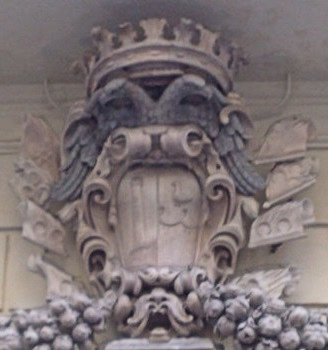
Arms of the unification of the Houses of Colonna (left) and Van den Eynde (right) standing above the main gate of Palazzo Zevallos Stigliano

Princess Giovanna van den Eynde (also spelled Vandeneinden, Vandeneynden, Van den Eynden, and Van den Einden) (c. 1672 – 1716) was a member of the Van den Eynde family, Marchioness of Castelnuovo by birth, and the Princess consort of Galatro and Sonnino. She was the daughter of Ferdinand van den Eynde, 1st Marquess of Castelnuovo, son of the magnate Jan van den Eynde, and Olimpia Piccolomini, of the House of Piccolomini. Through her marriage to Giuliano Colonna, Giovanna became a member of the House of Colonna, and the first Princess of Sonnino. Through his marriage to her, Giovanna's husband acquired the title of Marquess of Castelnuovo.

== Family ==
She was born into the Van den Eynde family, a powerful and influential Neapolitan noble family of Flemish origin. Her father was Ferdinand van den Eynde, 1st Marquess of Castelnuovo, the son of Jan van den Eynde, a wealthy merchant from Antwerp who became one of the richest and most prominent men in Naples. The Marquess Ferdinand married Olimpia Piccolomini, of the House of Piccolomini, a nephew of Cardinal Celio Piccolomini, by whom he had three daughters, Catherine, the eldest, Giovanna, the secondborn, and Elizabeth.

Her grandfather Jan had acquired the monumental Palazzo Zevallos Stigliano in central Naples in 1653, sumptuously renovating it in the following years. Jan van den Eynde was also the owner of the largest collection of paintings in Naples, which was bequeathed to his son upon his death. In 1674, the Marquess Ferdinand also inherited a sizable collection of 70 or 90 paintings from his longtime friend and business partner Gaspar Roomer. However, Marquess Ferdinand died that same year, and his collection, and assets, were split between his then-infant daughters, Giovanna and Elizabeth (his eldest daughter, Catherine, was later judged incapacitated, according to some sources). Van den Eynde's assets were frozen until each of his daughter reached adulthood and married. Luca Giordano, another longtime friend of Van den Eynde, took care himself of the inventory for Van den Eynde's inheritance. While drawing up the inventory, Giordano counted ten paintings executed by himself in Van den Eynde's collection. Among the paintings inherited by Giovanna, there were six paintings by Giordano and Mattia Preti's Belshazzar's Feast and The Banquet of Absalom.

== Marriage ==
In February 1688, she married Don Giuliano Colonna, of the House of Colonna, one of the most powerful families in Italy. Likewise, her sister Elizabeth married Don Carlo Carafa, of the House of Carafa, an equally powerful Italian family. Through their marriage, she became part of the House of Colonna and the first Princess of Sonnino, while her husband benefited from a huge dowry, and acquired the title of Marquess of Castelnuovo, as well as the opulent Palazzo Zevallos Stigliano.

== Progeny ==
She married Giuliano Colonna, 1st Prince of Sonnino. They had the following progeny:

- Ferdinando Colonna, 2nd Prince of Sonnino, 3rd Marquess of Castelnuovo
- Girolamo Colonna, Knight of Malta
- Gennaro Colonna, Knight of Malta
- Filippo Colonna
- Clelia
- Virginia
- Lorenzo

Italian nobility
Preceded by Ferdinand van den Eynde	Marchioness of Castelnuovo; 1688–1716	Succeeded by Ferdinando Colonna
Preceded by New creation	Princess consort of Sonnino; 1688–1716	Succeeded by Luisa Caracciolo
