= Jan van den Eynde =

Netherlandish merchant, banker, art collector and patron of the arts

- Born: Late 16th century or early 17th century Antwerp, Spanish Netherlands
- Died: 1674; Naples, Italy
- Spouse: Elisabetta Salvatori
- Children: Ferdinand van den Eynde, 1st Marquess of Castelnuovo; Giovanna Maria van den Eynde-di Gennaro; Caterina van den Eynde-Mastrilli
- Family: Van den Eynde

Jan van den Eynde or Vandeneynden (late 16th century or early 17th century – 1674) was a prominent Flemish merchant, banker, art collector and patron of the arts who spent the majority of his life in Naples. He was a brother of the merchant, art collector and art dealer Ferdinand van den Eynde. Attaining wealth and status in Naples, his son Ferdinand was admitted to the local aristocracy as the first Marquess of Castelnuovo. His granddaughter Elisabeth became Princess of Belvedere and Baroness of Gallicchio and Missanello while another granddaughter Giovanna became Princess of Galatro and Sonnino.

== Early life and family ==
Van den Eynde was born in Antwerp, Spanish Netherlands, into a wealthy family of merchants, artists and art dealers possibly tied to the local nobility. The family had close family links with notable Antwerp artist families such as the Brueghel family, the de Jode family and Lucas and Cornelis de Wael. Lucas and Cornelis de Wael were Ferdinand van den Eynde's nephews.

== Move to Italy ==
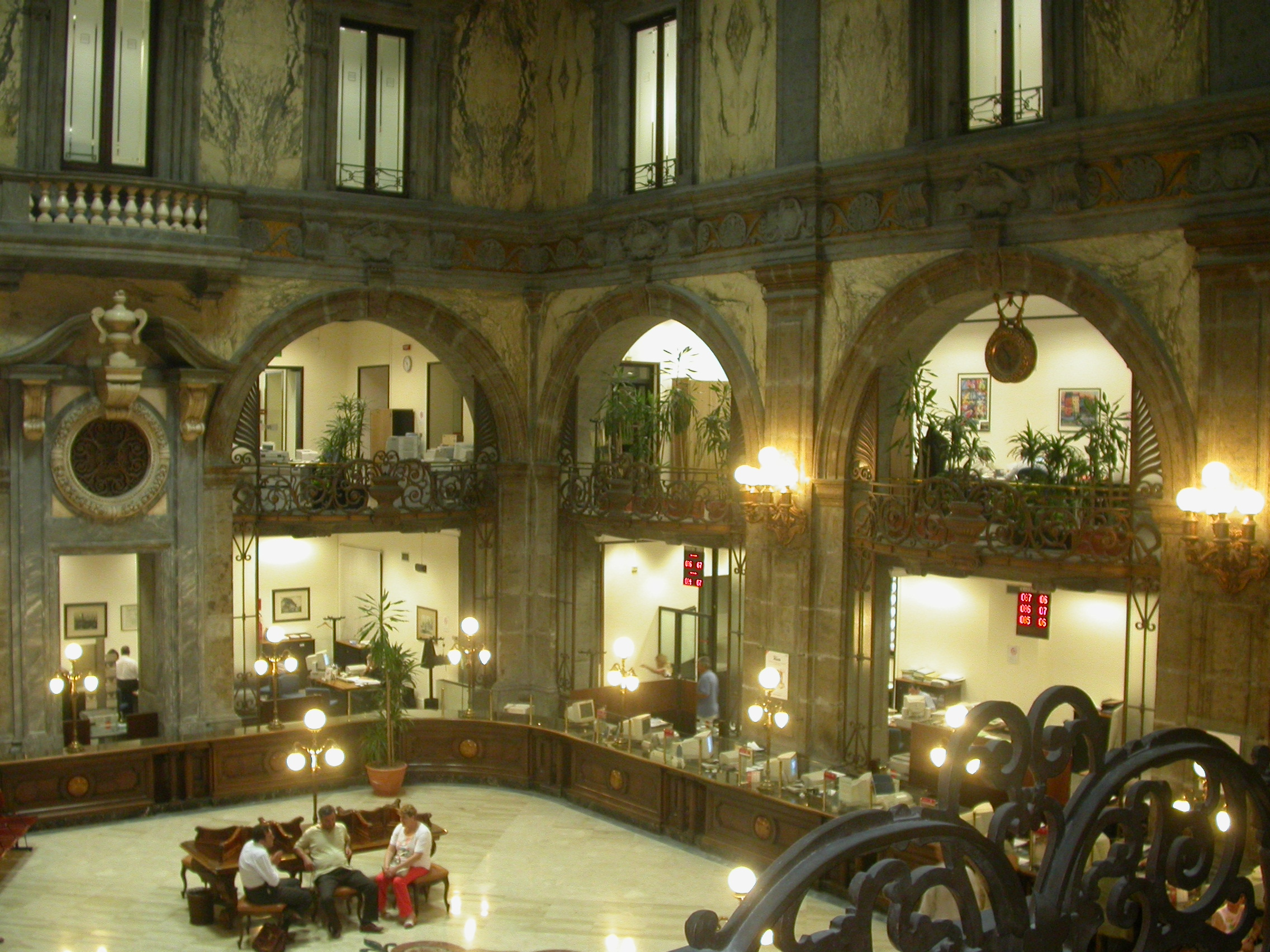
Interior courtyard of Palazzo Zevallos

In the early seventeenth century Jan and his brother Ferdinand left Antwerp for Italy. It is not known whether they travelled there together or at different times. Ferdinand is reported in Venice as early as the second decade of the 17th century. He later resettled in Genoa, ca. 1619, before moving to Southern Italy.

Jan is first recorded in Naples and did not follow his brother to Venice or Genoa.

Between 1633 and 1640, a remarkable epitaph to Jan's brother Ferdinand was completed in Rome by the Flemish sculptor François Duquesnoy. The putti included in this funerary monument are considered one of Duquesnoy's greatest achievements. Both Giovanni Battista Passeri and Giovanni Pietro Bellori highlighted the fame of these putti, which served as models for contemporary artists. Other notable artists such as Johann Joachim Winckelmann (generally a harsh critic of Baroque sculpture) and Peter Paul Rubens praised the putti.) Rubens even requested a copy of them and commented: "I do not know how [...] can I praise their beauty properly. It is nature, rather than art, that has formed them; the marble is softened into living flesh."

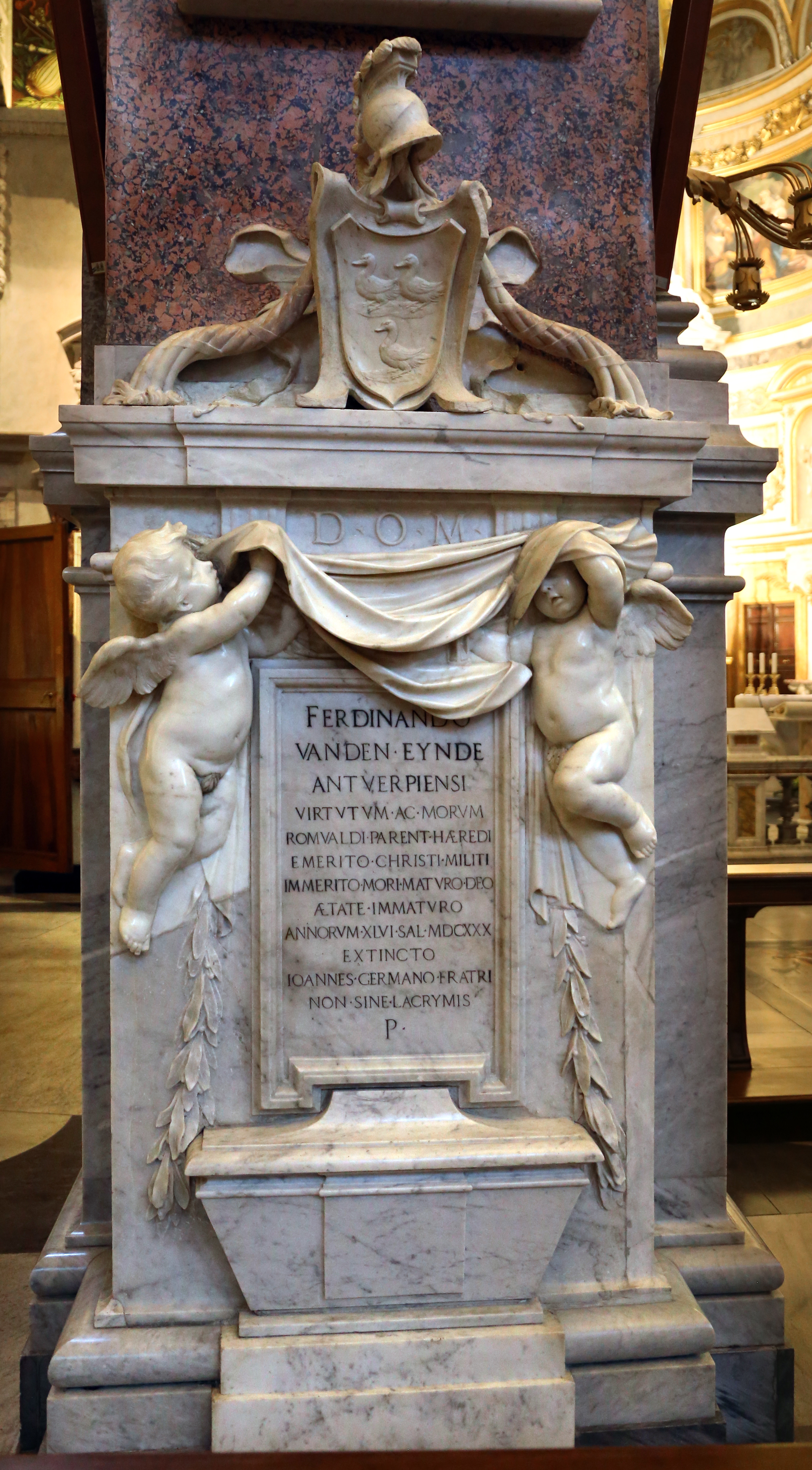
Epitaph of Ferdinand van den Eynde by François Duquesnoy in Rome

Ferdinand died prematurely in Rome in 1630, and was buried in Santa Maria dell'Anima. His nephew Cornelis de Wael was buried next to him. Two days before his death, Ferdinand made his will, bequeathing his art collection to his brother Jan.

In Naples, Jan established himself first as a dealer in grain, silk, diamonds and lace. Later he also became a successful banker. In 1636, he entered into a partnership with the Flemish émigré Gaspar Roomer, whose business dealt in luxury goods, lace, silk, grain, diamonds and ship insurance. After van den Eynde partnered with Roomer, the business saw a substantial increase in transactions, particularly in brokering operations and silk trading.

Jan van den Eynde became exceedingly rich. His wealth allowed him, among other things, to buy his son Ferdinand a peerage title. He purchased the monumental Palazzo Zevallos Stigliano (in central Naples) in 1653. Van den Eynde filled the palace with a colossal collection of paintings, by artist such as Leonard Bramer, Giacinto Brandi, Jan van Boeckhorst, Jan Brueghel the Elder, Paul Bril, Viviano Codazzi, Aniello Falcone, Guercino, David de Haen, Pieter van Laer, Jan Miel, Cornelius van Poelenburch, Cornelis Schut, Goffredo Wals, Bartolomeo Passante, Mattia Preti, Pieter Paul Rubens, Carlo Saraceni, Massimo Stanzione, Van Dyck, Simon Vouet, Pieter de Witte and many others. Throughout the Baroque period, it was the largest collection of paintings in Naples and the Napoletano. It included the finest artwork of Italian and Flemish painters. The collection influenced other art collectors of the day as well as the new generation of local painters. Jan van den Eynde did not only become one of the richest men in Naples, but also one of the most prominent figures in the Italian city, developing strong ties with the Italian nobility and a close relationship with the viceroys. The Neapolitan citizens called him Vandìn.

== Last years and progeny ==
Jan van den Eynde made his will in 1671. He died in Naples in 1674, the same year in which his son Ferdinand passed away.

Ferdinand, first Marquess of Castelnuovo, was Jan van den Eynde's designated heir. However, in 1671 Van den Eynde ordered several legati. He left annual revenue of 10,000 ducats from his landed estate to his young grandson, Giovanni Mastrillo-van den Eynde, 3rd Marquess of Gallo (later 5th Duke of Marigliano), the son of his daughter Caterina van den Eynde, provided that he add Van den Eynde to his surname (item lascio jure legati a D. Giovanni Mastrillo Marchese del Gallo mio carissimo nipote docati 10 mila di capitale con sue annue entrate, cioè docati 5000 sopra la gabella del carlino a staro d'oglio, che da me si possiede, e gli altri docati 5000 sopra la grana 25 ad oncia con li loro frutti, con condizione, che appresso il suo Cognome si debba mettere il mio di Vandeneynden) and the right to 10 000 ducats' worth of income is never sold, lent out, or pledged.

Van den Eynde ordered an identical legato for the future firstborn of his other daughter, Giovanna Maria van den Eynde (mother of Giuseppe di Gennaro Vandeneynden, 1st Prince of Sirignano) and Filippo di Gennaro, with the same conditions: that the family name Van den Eynde be appended and the bequest neither sold nor given away. Both marriages produced offspring, and both heirs added Van den Eynde to their name.

Van den Eynde's son Ferdinand (for whom, as mentioned, he purchased a peerage title) married Olimpia Piccolomini, niece of Cardinal Celio Piccolomini. He restored the Van den Eynde's Palazzo Zevallos Stigliano, widened its art collection, and built the Villa Carafa of Belvedere in Vomero. Ferdinand had two daughters, Elisabeth and Giovanna, who married the heirs of two of the most powerful Italian families, the Colonna and the Carafa. Both marriages produced offspring.
