= Museum Correale =

Museum in Sorrento, Italy

Coordinates: 40°37′34.6″N 14°22′32.9″E

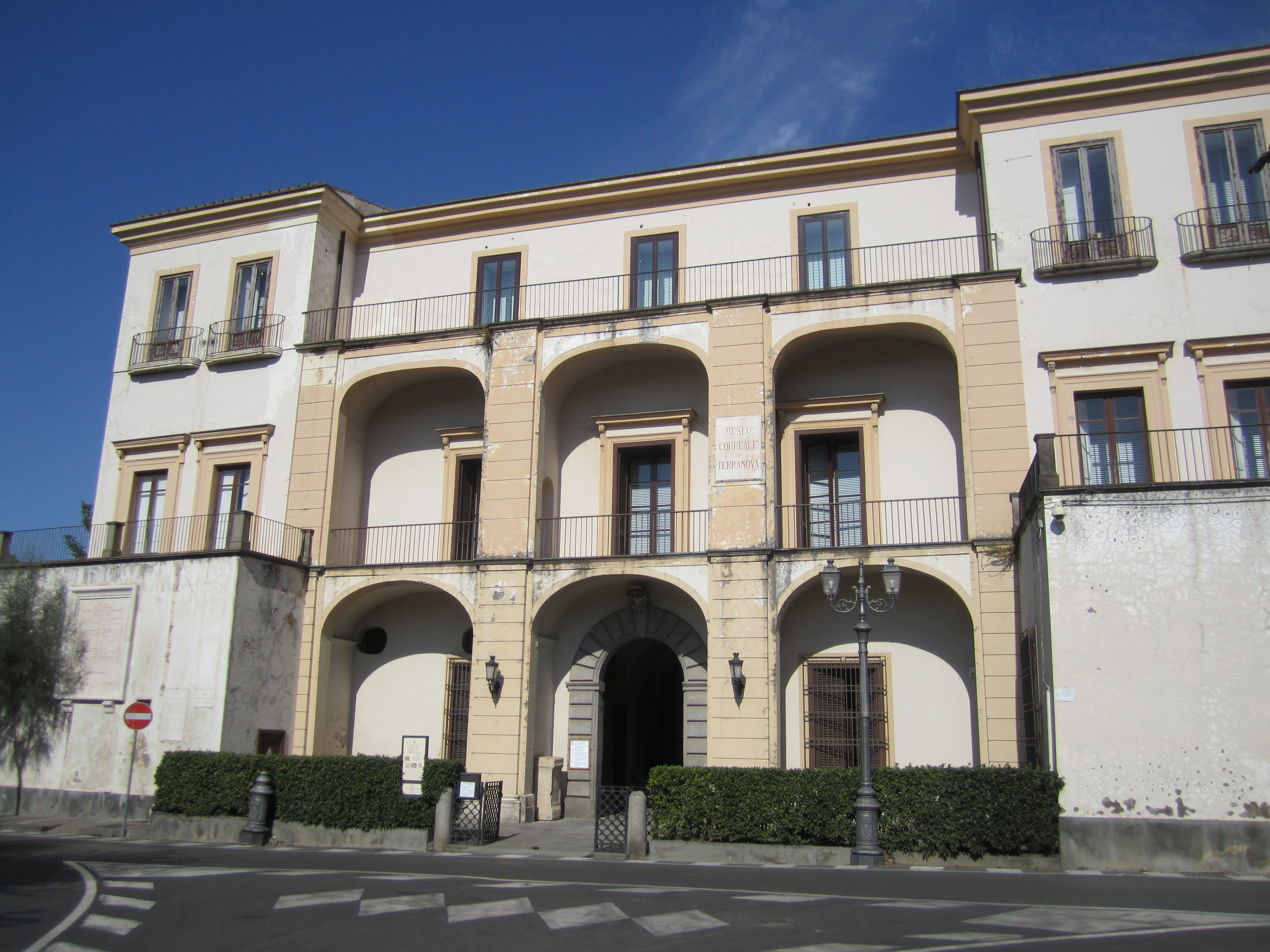
Museo Correale di Terranova in Sorrento, Italy.

Museum Correale (Italian: Museo Correale di Terranova) is a museum in Sorrento in the south of Italy.

The museum is situated in a patrician villa, surrounded by a citrus grove, with a terrace of Belvedere that overlooks the Gulf of Naples. The villa and its contents were donated by Pompeo and Alfredo Correale, the last of their line.

The museum exhibits collections of Neapolitan painters dating from the 17th and 18th century. It contains valuable Capodimonte and Sèvres ceramics, Murano glassware, Bohemia crystals and a collection of watches. There is also an archaeological collection. Some works date from the 19th century, and the mansion displays tables, furnishings and finely inlaid jewel cases. In the library are works by Torquato Tasso.

== Collection ==
The museum's collections are arranged on three floors in twenty-four halls:

- Founders' hall and chapel: The Sorrento tarsia section dates from the 19th century, with an archaeological section and Romanesque section.
- First floor: This area hosts paintings and furniture dating to the 18th century by Caracciolo, Andrea Vaccaro, Micco Spadaro, Corenzio, Lanfranco, Paolo de Matteis, Del Po, Rossi, Francesco de Mura, Giuseppe Bonito, C. Amalfi, Giuseppe Pascaletti and Oriental chinaware dating to the 17th and 18th century. The hall of Flemish painters exhibits Rubens, J. Vari Kassel, Grimmer and Michiel Sweerts.
- Second floor: Paintings dating from the 17th and 18th century by Giovan Battista Ruoppolo, Tommaso Realfonso, G. Cusati, Aniello Ascione, G. Casissa and landscape painters from the 18th and 19th century: Déms, Gaspard Dughet, Rabbel and Vervloet; landscape painters of the School of Posillipo: Antonie Sminck Pitloo, Duelere, Giacinto Gigante and in the hall of the Italian and European watches dating from the 18th century.
- Third floor: Italian and foreign majolica dating from the 17th and 18th century from Milan, Savona, Castelli Romani, Sicily, Calabria and Ruen. Italian and foreign chinaware dating from the 18th century from Meissen, Vienna, Ludwigsburg, Nymphenburg, Zurich, Chelsea, Bow, Saint Petersburg, Capodimonte and Venice.
