= Marcantonio Colonna of Stigliano, 3rd Prince of Sonnino =

Spanish politician

Marcantonio Colonna Prince of Sonnino
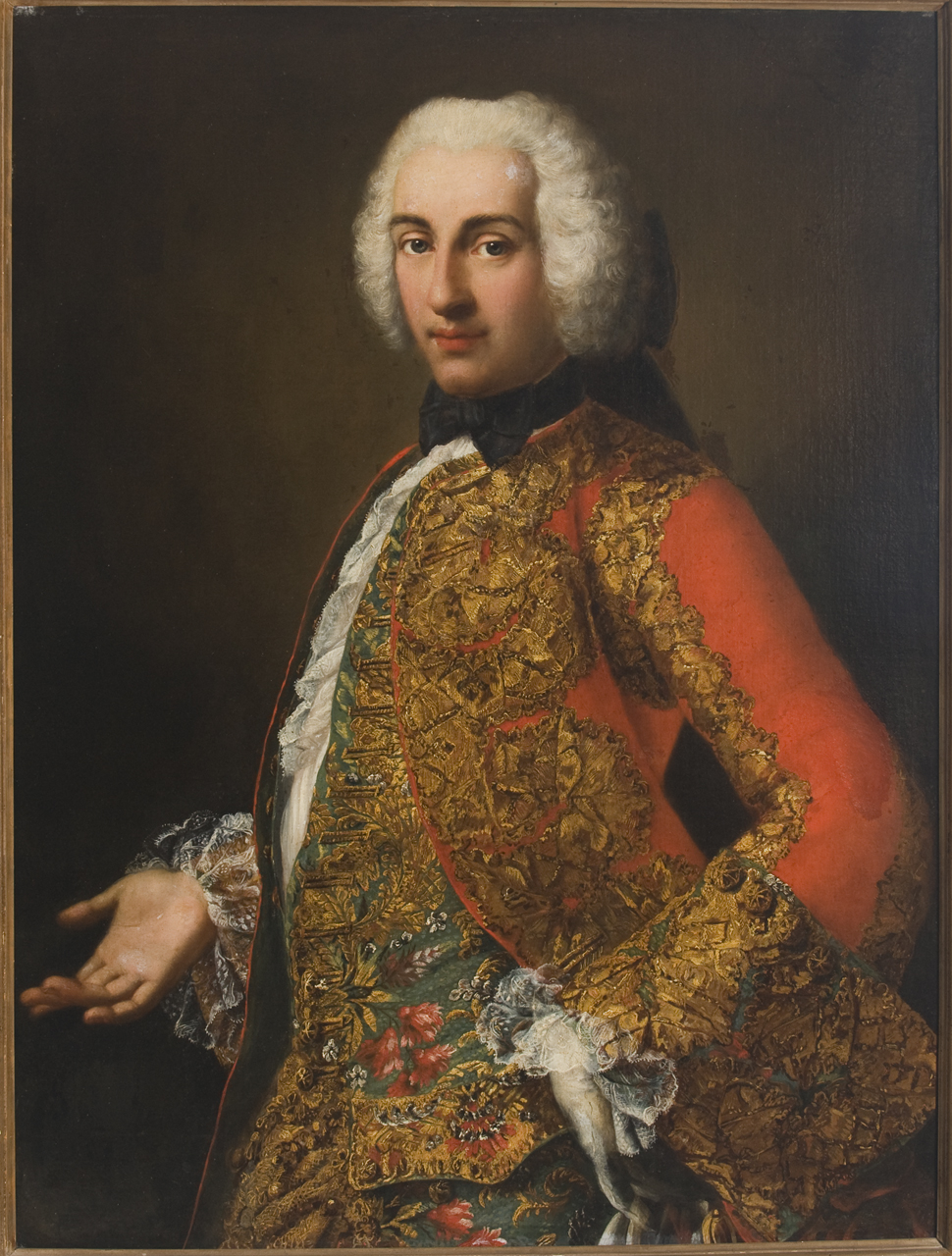
- Portrait by Giuseppe Pascaletti

Viceroy of Sicily
- In office 1775–1781
- Monarch: Ferdinand I of the Two Sicilies
- Preceded by: Giovanni Fogliani Sforza d'Aragona, Marquess of Pellegrino
- Succeeded by: Domenico Caracciolo, Marquess of Villamaina

Personal details
- Born: 18 March 1724 Naples
- Died: 16 August 1796 (aged 72) Naples
- Spouse: Giulia of Avalos of Aquino of Aragona
- Children: Andrea Colonna, 3rd Prince of Stigliano, 5th Marquess of Castelnuovo
- Parents: Ferdinando Colonna-van den Eynde (father); Luisa Caracciolo of Santobuono (mother)

Military service
- Allegiance: Kingdom of Sicily; Order of Saint Januarius

Marcantonio Colonna, 3rd Prince of Sonnino and 4th Marquess of Castelnuovo (Grande de España) (18 March 1724 – 16 August 1795) was an Italian nobleman, military and politician. He was Prince of Sonnino, Marquess of Castelnuovo, Grandee of Spain, and Knight of the Order of Saint Januarius. He became Viceroy of Sicily in 1775.

== Biography ==
Marcantonio was born in Naples, Kingdom of Naples, to Ferdinando Colonna and Luisa Caracciolo. He became a courtier with the title of Gentiluomo di camera d'esercizio, and was very close to the young King Ferdinand IV during the regency of the Prince of San Nicandro and the Marquess Tanucci.

On June 16, 1765 he was sent as an extraordinary ambassador to Innsbruck, Austria, on the occasion of the marriage between the Infanta of Spain, Maria Luisa, daughter of Charles 3rd of Bourbon, and the then Archduke of Tuscany (future emperor) Pietro Leopoldo. He became commander of the naval volunteer battalions in 1773. He became Viceroy of Sicily and Captain general of Sicily in 1775.

In October 1774, he was sent as viceroy to Sicily. He replaced in this role, Giovanni Fogliani, who had engendered a revolt in Palermo that caused him to flee to Messina. The events in Palermo had been triggered by food shortages, and the death of a popular leader at the hands of Fogliani's surgeon. Marcantonio held office in Sicily until 1781. During his tenure, he enlarged the library of Palermo and built a public garden in Palermo.

He returned to Naples and was given the title of captain of the royal guards. He died in Naples in 1796.

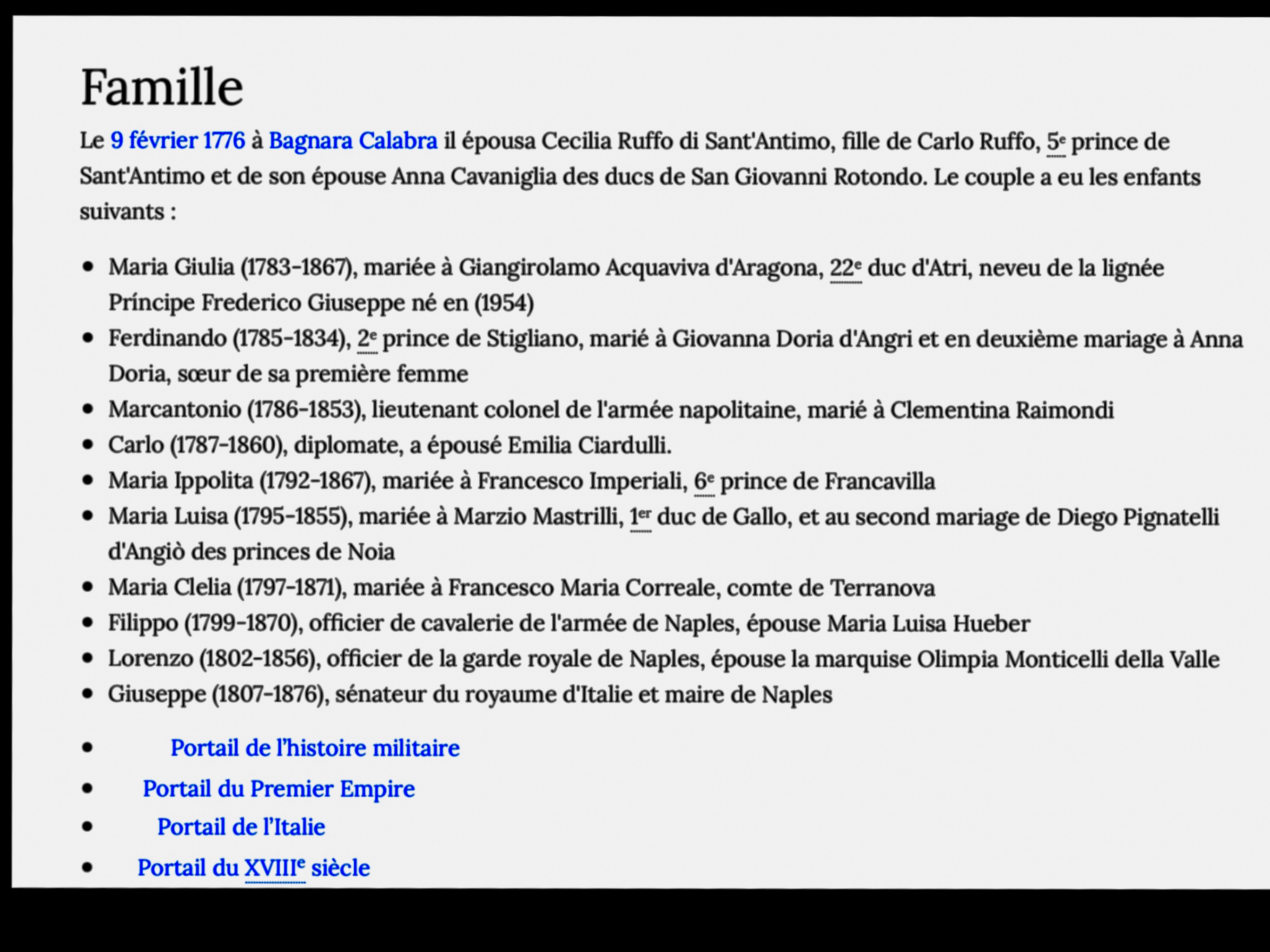
DESCENDANTS OF ANDREA COLONNA 3rd PRINCE OF STIGLIANO

Government offices
Preceded by Giovanni Sforza d'Aragona	Viceroy of Sicily; 1775–1781	Succeeded by Domenico Caracciolo
Italian nobility
Preceded by Ferdinando Colonna	Prince of Sonnino; 1775–1796	Succeeded by Andrea Colonna
Preceded by Ferdinando Colonna	Marquess of Castelnuovo; 1775–1796	Succeeded by Andrea Colonna
