= Giuliano Colonna of Stigliano, 1st Prince of Sonnino =

Italian nobleman

Giuliano Colonna
- Prince of Sonnino and Galatro
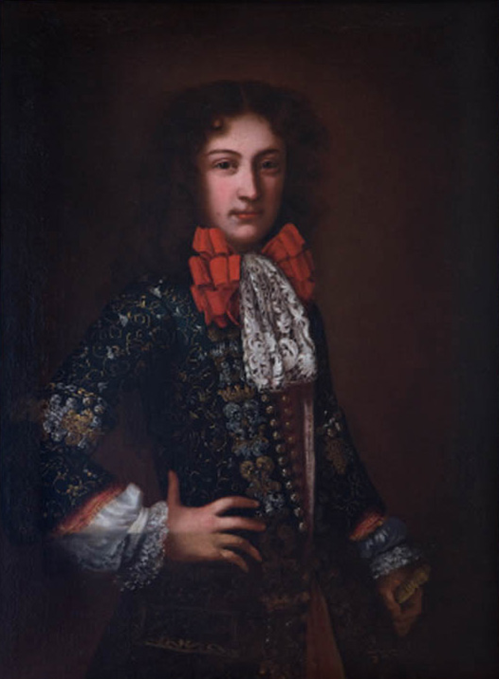
- Portrait of Giuliano Colonna, 1st Prince of Sonnino, anonymous
- Born: 10 December 1671; Rome
- Died: 11 April 1732 (aged 60); Naples
- Noble family: House of Colonna
- Spouse: Giovanna van den Eynde, Marchioness of Castelnuovo
- Issue: Ferdinando Colonna, 2nd Prince of Sonnino, 3rd Marquess of Castelnuovo; Girolamo Colonna, Knight of Malta; Gennaro Colonna, Knight of Malta; Filippo Colonna; Cleria; Virginia; Lorenzo
- Father: Filippo Colonna
- Mother: Clelia Cesarini

Giuliano Colonna, 1st Prince o Sonnino (Grande de España) (10 December 1671 – 11 April 1732) was an Italian nobleman of the House of Colonna. He was Prince of Galatro and Sonnino, and a Grandee of Spain. In 1688 he married the great heiress Giovanna van den Eynde, from whom he acquired a fortune, the title of Marquess of Castelnuovo, and the Palazzo Zevallos Stigliano.

== Life ==
He was born on December 10, 1671, in Rome, the son of Filippo Colonna, Lord of Sonnino, and his wife Clelia Cesarini.

As a teenager, he was married to the great heiress Giovanna van den Eynde. Through his marriage to her, he acquired the title of Marquess of Castelnuovo, the Palazzo Zevallos Stigliano, a huge art collection, and the greater part of the van den Eynde's fortune, all of which contributed to boost his position.

In 1690, the king of Naples chose him as his ambassador to the Holy See for the traditional presentation of the chinea, the symbolic annual tribute paid by the king of Naples to the pontiff. King Philip V of Spain, sovereign of the kingdom of Naples, granted him the Grandeza de España in 1715.

He died in Naples on April 11, 1732.

== Marriage and progeny ==
He married Giovanna van den Eynde, Marchioness of Castelnuovo by whom he had the following progeny:

- Ferdinando Colonna, 2nd Prince of Sonnino, 3rd Marquess of Castelnuovo
- Girolamo Colonna, Knight of Malta
- Gennaro Colonna, Knight of Malta
- Filippo Colonna
- Cleria
- Virginia
- Lorenzo

Italian nobility
| Preceded by New creation | Prince of Sonnino; 1688–1732 | Succeeded by Ferdinando Colonna |
