= Ferdinand van den Eynde, 1st Marquess of Castelnuovo =

Italian nobleman and magnate of Flemish descent

Ferdinand van den Eynde
- Marquess of Castelnuovo
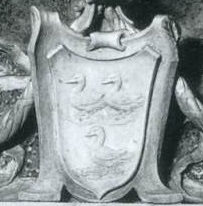
- Arms of Van den Eynde
- Born: Mid-17th century Naples
- Died: 1674; Naples
- Noble family: Van den Eynde
- Spouse: Olimpia Piccolomini
- Issue: Giovanna van den Eynde-Colonna; Elisabeth van den Eynde-Carafa; Catherine van den Eynde
- Father: Jan van den Eynde

Ferdinand van den Eynde, 1st Marquess of Castelnuovo (mid-17th century – 1674) was an Italian nobleman and magnate of Flemish descent. He was the son of Jan van den Eynde, and the father of Elisabeth van den Eynde, Princess of Belvedere and Baroness of Gallicchio and Missanello and Jane (Giovanna) van den Eynde, Princess of Galatro and Sonnino. He should not be confused with his namesake and uncle Ferdinand van den Eynde.

== Family ==
Van den Eynde was probably born in Naples in the mid-17th century. He was the son of Jan van den Eynde, an extremely wealthy Flemish merchant who had become one of the richest men in Naples through trading and banking. Jan van den Eynde was also one of the most prominent figures in 17th-century Naples, as well as the owner of the largest art collection in the Napoletano. Jan was brother to Ferdinand van den Eynde, who was buried in 1630 in the church of Santa Maria dell'Anima in Rome.

== Life ==
The Van den Eynde were related to notable Netherlandish artists such as Brueghel, Jode, and Lucas and Cornelis de Wael. Lucas and Cornelis de Wael were nephews of his uncle Ferdinand. In 1653, his father Jan acquired the Palazzo Zevallos Stigliano, as well as a hereditary title for his son Ferdinand.

Marquess Ferdinand restructured Palazzo Zevallos, and, between 1671 and 1674, he built the monumental Villa Carafa of Belvedere in Vomero, which today is the most historical villa in Vomero and one of the best known villas of Naples.

When Gaspar Roomer, who had been both his and his father's friend and business partner, died in 1674, he bequeathed to Van den Eynde his own collection of paintings, composed of 70 or 90 items which included pieces by Peter Paul Rubens and Luca Giordano, further enlarging Van den Eynde's collection. However, Van den Eynde died of consumption the same year, and his huge collection passed to his daughters, Elisabeth and Jane (Giovanna). Giordano was a friend of Van den Eynde, and he drew up the inventory for Van den Eynde's inheritance himself(at that time, Giordano counted ten paintings executed by himself in Van den Eynde's collection). Van den Eynde's daughters, Giovanna and Elisabeth, married the heirs of two of the most powerful Italian families, the Colonna and the Carafa. Giovanna married Giuliano Colonna, 1st Prince of Sonnino and Galatro, while Elisabeth married Carlo Carafa, 3rd Principe of Belvedere, 6th Marquess of Anzi and Lord of Trivigno.

== Marriage and progeny ==
Van den Eynde married Olimpia Piccolomini, niece of Cardinal Celio, by whom he had the following progeny:

- Jane (Giovanna) van den Eynde-Colonna, Princess of Galatro and Sonnino.
- Elisabeth van den Eynde-Carafa, Baroness of Gallicchio and Missanello and Princess of Belvedere.
- Catherine van den Eynde

Italian nobility
| New creation | Marquess of Castelnuovo; 1660–1674 | Succeeded by Johanna van den Eynde |
