= Gaspar Roomer =

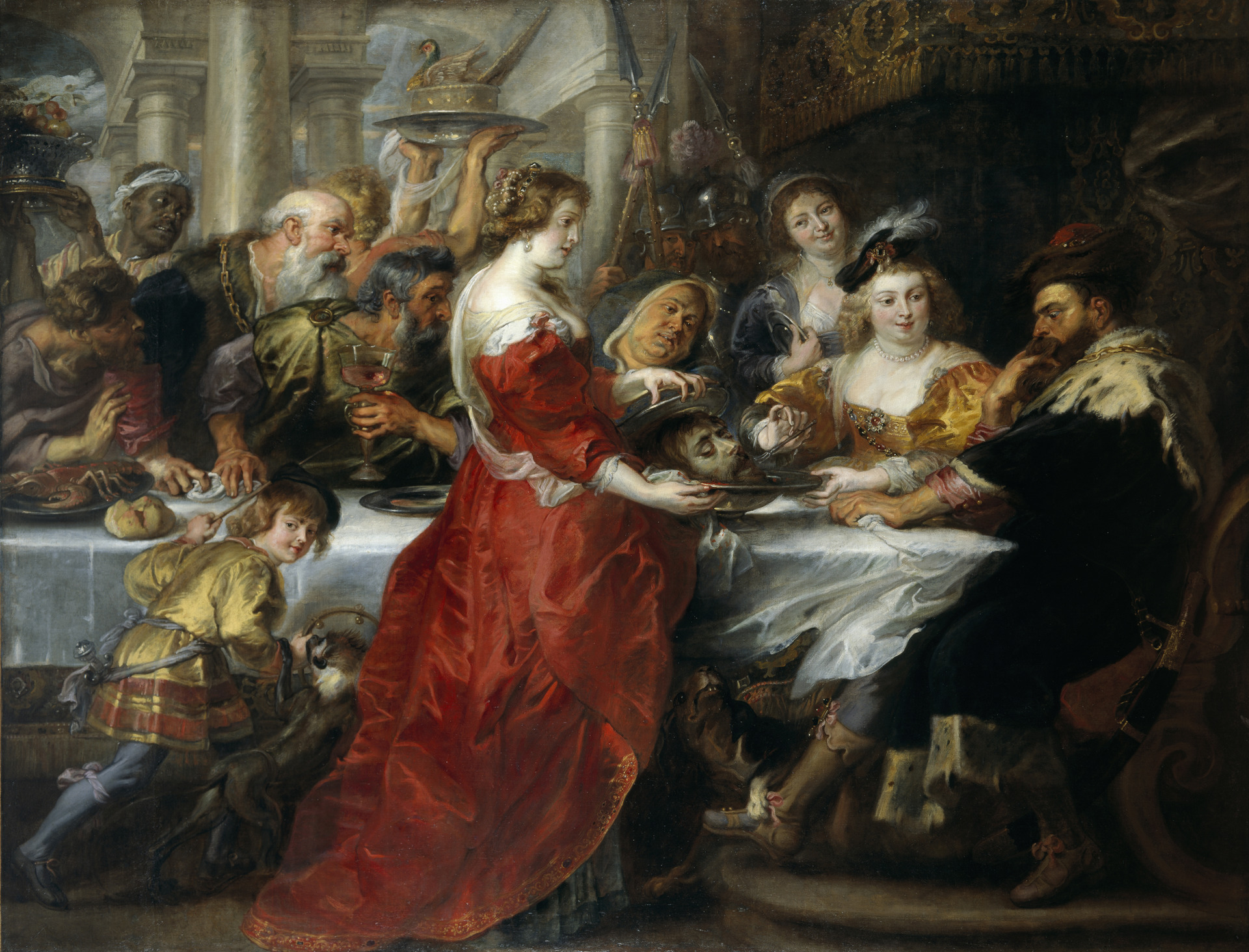
Feast of Herod, painted by Peter Paul Rubens for Gaspar Roomer

Gaspar Roomer (between 1596 and 1606 – 3 April 1674) was a Flemish merchant, banker, art patron and art collector who was active in Naples in the 17th century. He played an important role in the support and promotion of Flemish artists who visited and worked in Naples.

== Biography ==
Born in Antwerp, he lived for at least four decades in Naples, probably starting from 1626 and definitely from the 1630s. He became very wealthy from his trading activities, mainly with the Flemish and Dutch provinces and from banking, including as a financier to Philip IV, King of Spain. He owned a sumptuous villa called 'Villa Bisignano' (also referred to now as 'Villa Roomer') in the Barra neighborhood of Naples. The balustrades in the villa, perhaps at his suggestion, are decorated with carvings of warriors and hunchbacks, based on northern European prints. The contemporary historian Giulio Cesare Capaccio also recorded "marvellous ornaments that came all the way from China". Roomer owned chinoiserie furniture and may have played a role in popularizing this style in Naples. He was active in the trade of paintings between Southern and Northern Italy through such agents as the Flemish artists and traders Cornelis de Wael and Abraham Brueghel, who were resident in Genoa and Rome.

== Art collecting and patronage ==
Gaspar Roomer was part of a group of private patrons and collectors in Naples, which also included his fellow countryman Ferdinand Vandeneynden, who contributed to a more modern and outward-looking taste in painting in Naples starting from the mid 1630s. Roomer's taste was both contemporary and broad in style, and across nationalities. He collected works by Flemish and Dutch masters together with those of local painters. He collected across various genres including Caravaggist paintings, landscapes and genre paintings. Roomer was unique among 17th-century collectors in acquiring many non-religious works. He was also an avid collector of drawings. When he died in 1674, his art collection contained over 1,500 paintings. His collection was dispersed throughout Europe after his death.

He was a patron of artists. In the late 1630s he commissioned from Rubens The Feast of Herod (now in the National Gallery of Scotland in Edinburgh). This Rubens painting may have contributed to the introduction to Naples of a neo-Venetian style that would impact on the evolution of the local Baroque. He also invited the local painter Aniello Falcone to paint frescos in his villa. This cycle on the History of Moses in the Villa Roomer is the only complete surviving fresco cycle of this artist. As a trader and patron of the arts, Roomer acted as a conduit for the dispersion of styles in Naples.

Painters in his collection included (in alphabetical order):

Leonard Bramer, Giacinto Brandi, Giacomo Borgognone, Jan van Boeckhorst, Gerard van der Bos, Jan Brueghel the Elder, Paul Bril, Caracciolo, Castiglione, Viviano Codazzi, Jacques Duyvelant, Aniello Falcone, Giordano, Guercino, David de Haen, Pieter van Laer, Jan Miel, Cornelius van Poelenburgh, Cornelis Schut, Goffredo Wals, Bartolomeo Passante, Mattia Preti, Ribera (Drunken Silenus), Rubens, Sacchi, Saraceni, Massimo Stanzione, Van Dyck, Simon Vouet and Pieter de Witte.

== See also ==
- Jan van den Eynde
- Ferdinand van den Eynde
