= Palazzo Zevallos Stigliano =

- Palazzo Zevallos Stigliano
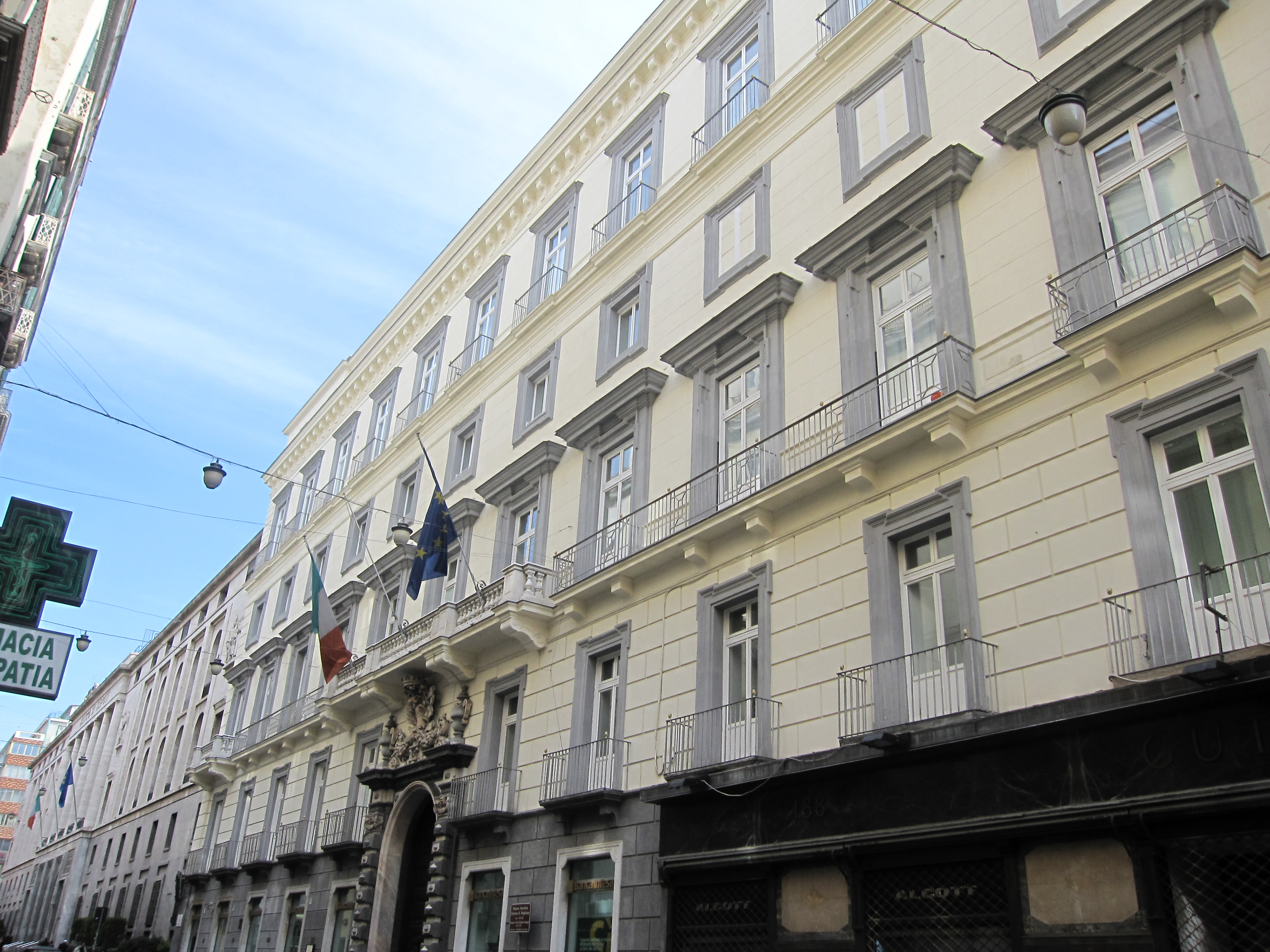
- Façade
- Established: 1989
- Location: Via Toledo 185, Naples, Italy
- Coordinates: 40.8397°N 14.2486°E
- Type: Art museum, Historic site
- Website: www.palazzozevallos.com

The Palazzo Zevallos Stigliano is a Baroque palace located on Via Toledo number 185 in the quartiere San Ferdinando of central Naples, Italy. It is also called the Palazzo Zevallos or Palazzo Colonna di Stigliano, and from 2014 until 2022 served as a museum of artworks, mainly spanning the 17th through the early 20th centuries, sponsored by the Cultural Project of the bank Intesa Sanpaolo. This museum, now at former Headquarters of the Banco di Napoli in via Toledo, is linked to the Museum or Gallerie di Piazza Scala in Milan and the Museum at Palazzo Leoni Montanari in Vicenza, also owned by the Bank.

== History ==
The palace was commissioned by Giovanni Zevallos, Duke of Ostuni. The palace was built between 1637 and 1639 after a design by Cosimo Fanzago. The palace was damaged during the 1646 Revolution of Masaniello, and in 1653 sold to the Flemish merchant Jan van den Eynde, at the time one of the richest men in Naples. Jan van den Eynde and his son Ferdinand wholly renovated the palace, with the help of the architect-friar Bonaventura Presti.

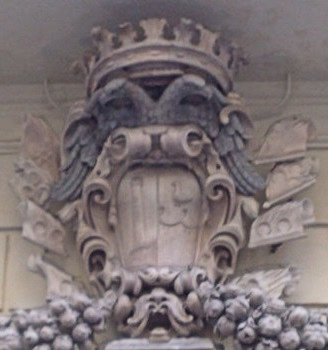
Arms of the unification of the Houses of Colonna (left) and Van den Eynde (right) standing above the gate of the Palazzo Zevallos Stigliano

Van den Eynde, who was also the owner of one of largest art collections in the Napoletano, filled the palace with a colossal collection of paintings, by artist such as Leonard Bramer, Giacinto Brandi, Jan van Boeckhorst, Jan Brueghel the Elder, Paul Bril, Viviano Codazzi, Aniello Falcone, Guercino, David de Haen, Pieter van Laer, Jan Miel, Cornelius van Poelenburch, Cornelis Schut, Goffredo Wals, Bartolomeo Passante, Mattia Preti, Pieter Paul Rubens, Carlo Saraceni, Massimo Stanzione, Van Dyck, Simon Vouet, Pieter de Witte and many others. Jan van den Eynde's granddaughter, Giovanna van den Eynde, daughter of the Marquess Ferdinand, married the Prince of Sonnino, Giuliano Colonna, who then inherited the palace in 1688. The palace still bears the Arms of unification of the Van den Eynde and Colonna over its gate.

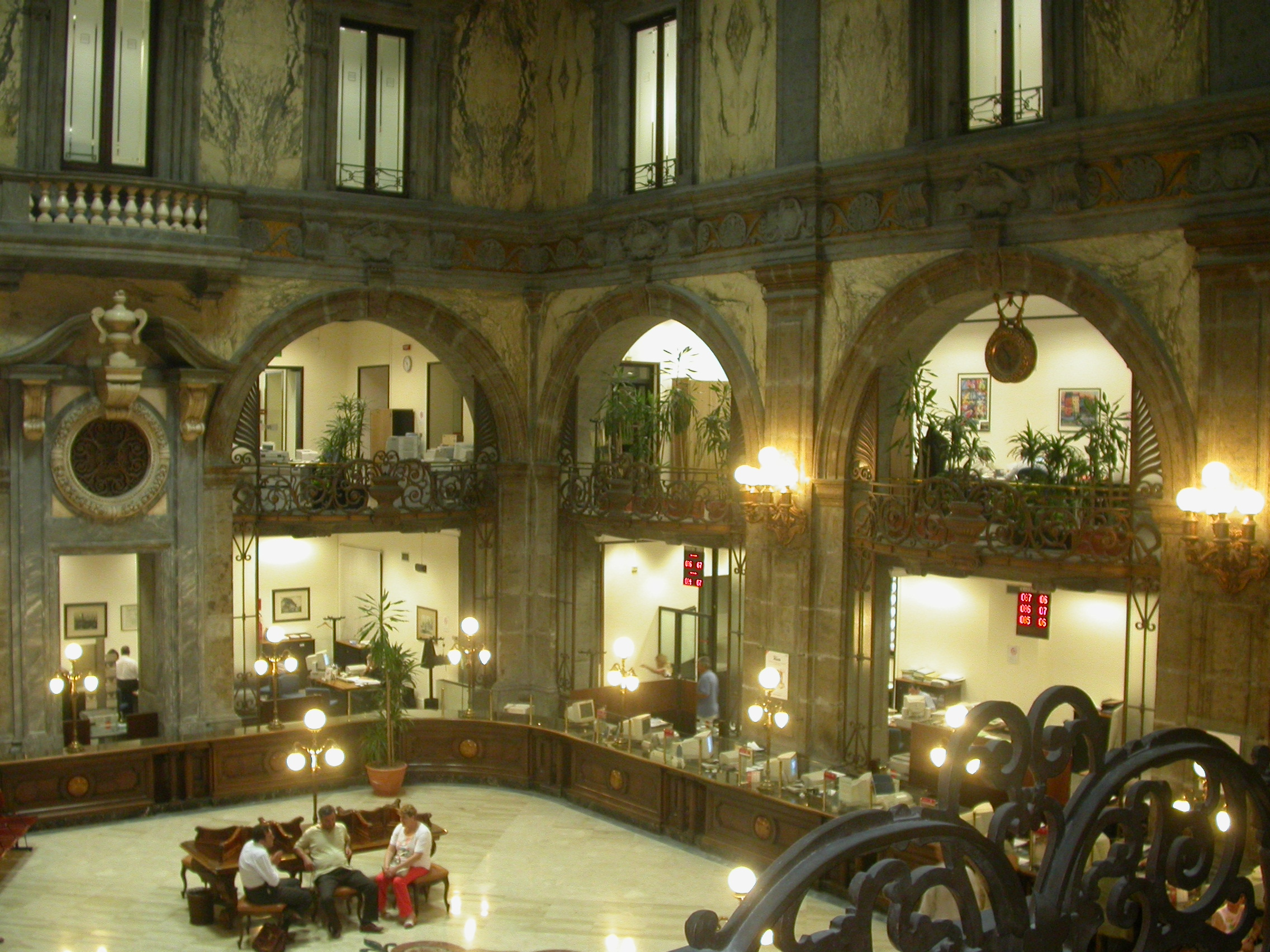
Interior courtyard.

Over the decades following the end of the 19th century, the palace was acquired by the Banca Commerciale Italiana, and reconstruction was pursued under architect Luigi Platania. The facade acquired its present look, and a monumental marble staircase was installed, which is surrounded by 19th century frescoes by Giuseppe Cammarano and Gennaro Maldarelli. The frescoes include Cammarano's Apotheosis of Sappho (1832). The courtyard was made into a stunning covered public hall vaulted by a glass ceiling with a floral motifs. The palace became a public museum and gallery. In 2001 Banca Intesa, became the Intesa Sanpaolo.

== Collections ==
Among the works contained in the gallery are:

- The Martyrdom of Saint Ursula by Caravaggio, thought to be his final work
- Judith and Holofernes, attributed to Louis Finson, which may be a copy of a Caravaggio original
- Holy Family with St Francis of Assisi, by Angelo Caroselli
- Christ and the Adulturess by Bernardo Cavallino
- San Giorgio by Francesco Guarini
- Adoration by the Magi attributed to Master of the Annunciation to the Shepherds
- Tobias heals his father's blindness by Hendrick de Somer
- Two still-life canvases by Paolo Porpora
- Still life with bread, fruit, game, and fish by Giovan Battista Ruoppolo
- Two still lifes by Giuseppe Recco
- Still-lifes with Vases of Flowers (1715) by Baldassare De Caro
- Hagar and Ishmael in Desert with Angel by Francesco Solimena
- The secret letter and The Concert by Gaspare Traversi
- Four Veduta of Naples including Largo di Palazzo and il borgo di Chiaia da Pizzofalcone (1729) by Gaspare van der Wittel (Vanvitelli)
- Landscape by Anton Sminck Pitloo
- Four water color landscapes by Giacinto Gigante
- Landscape with laghetto by Nicola Palizzi
- La terrazza di Domenico Morelli by Achille Carrillo
- Isabella Orsini duchessa di Bracciano (1844) by Francesco Domenico Guerrazzi
- Landscapes by Federico Rossano
- Landscapes by Marco De Gregorio
- Landscape by Giuseppe De Nittis
- Landscapes by Gioacchino Toma
- Landscape by Giuseppe Fabozzi
- Landscape by Francesco Mancini
- Portrait of painter Vincenzo Migliaro by Gaetano Esposito
- Two self-portraits by Francesco Paolo Michetti
- Woman with fan by Domenico Morelli
- Two capricci of antique monuments by Vincenzo Abbati and Domenico Battaglia
- Work by Paolo Vetri
- Urban vedute by Carlo Brancaccio, Francesco Mancini, Francesco Paolo Diodati and Vincenzo Migliaro
- Frescoes of Faith by Giuseppe Cammarano and Gennaro Maldarelli
- Portraits of Mariano Fortuny and Domenico Morelli, by Vincenzo Gemito
- Kidnapping of Helen and Immaculate Conception by Luca Giordano
- Christ Blessing by Francesco Di Maria
- Four allegories of Faith (ovals, 1759) by Francesco De Mura from Sala delle Udienze of the Palazzo Monte di Pieta, Naples
