= Baldassarre De Caro =

Italian painter

Baldassarre De Caro (Naples, 1689- 1750) was an Italian painter of still lifes, mainly of hunted game, but also of flowers. The mood of his paintings is often morbid.

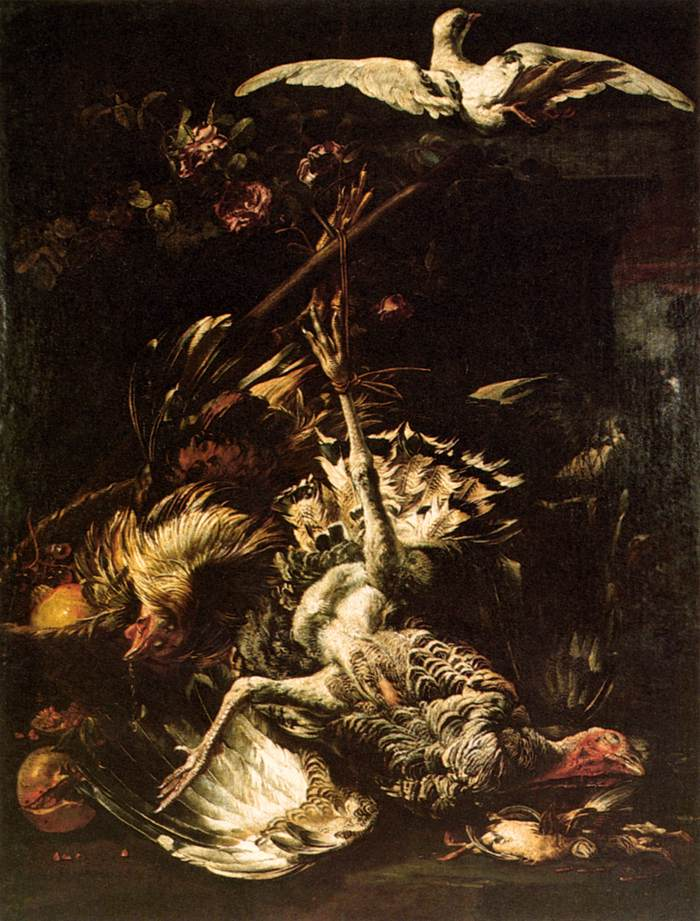
Dead turkey, fruit and flying pigeon

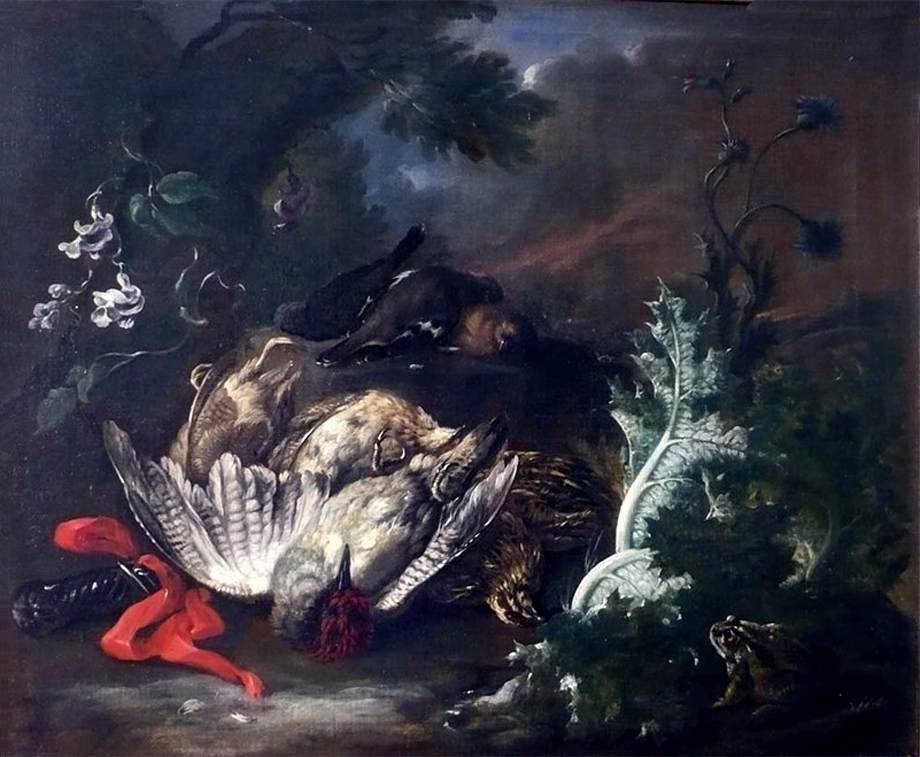
Dead game

According to his biographer Bernardo de' Dominici, he was a pupil of Andrea Belvedere, where he trained alongside Tommaso Realfonso, Gaspare Lopez, Gaetano d'Alteriis, and Nicola Casissa. There had been an active school of still life painting in Naples, starting with Porpora via Ruoppolo to Belvedere. De Caro was also influenced by Spanish Bodegones and Flemish painters, including Frans Snyders, David de Coninck, Jan Fyt and the Neapolitan resident Abraham Brueghel.

For some years, De Caro found patronage and favor with the Bourbon court of Naples. This success would not last as his style finally became too old fashioned and indebted to the Spanish "Bodegón" and he was repeating his works in too many copies.

His sons Giuseppe and Lorenzo (not to be confused with the more successful Lorenzo De Caro) De Caro were also still life painters. Giuseppe claimed to have trained with the renowned Baroque painter Francesco Solimena.

== Sources ==
- Italian Treccani Encyclopedia entry, by Roberto Middione, Volume 33 (1987).

Maria Carmela Masi, La ricostruzione della quadreria del Real Casino di Carditello. Il trionfo della natura morta nel Settecento in Carditello Ritrovato: Siti Reali e territorio n. 2 e 3: storia restauro valorizzazione, Roma, Artemide, 2014 ISBN 9788875751623
