= Recco (surname) =

Recco is a surname. Notable people with the surname include:

- Elena Recco (1654–1700), Italian painter
- Giuseppe Recco (1634–1695), Italian painter, father of Elena
- Jerry Recco (born 1974), American sports radio personality
- Tommy Recco (born 1934), French serial killer
