= Giacomo Recco =

Italian painter

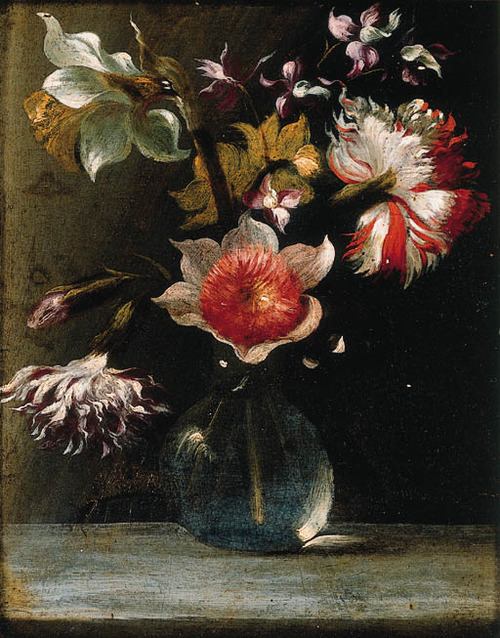
Assorted Flowers in a Glass Vase

Giacomo Recco (1603, Naples - 1653, Naples) was an Italian Baroque painter who specialized in flowers. His brother, Giovanni Battista Recco, was also an artist.

== Works and career ==
In 1961, he was the subject of a study by the art historian, Raffaello Causa (1923-1984), who reattributed a work that had originally been credited to Giovanni da Udine, as well as assigning previously unattributed works to him, such as "Vase of Flowers of Cardinal Poli" and "Vase of Flowers of the Spada Family". The paintings all feature the same types of vases, with flowers arranged in rays from a dark background.

His other works include:

- "Vase of Tulips, Anemones and Imperial Crowns" (1626), currently at the Palazzo Pitti, it originally belonged to Ferdinando II de' Medici.
- "Daffodils and Marigolds in a Blue Porcelain Vase Decorated with a Hunter Capturing an Ostrich", sold at Christie's, New York, in 1997.

His son, Giuseppe Recco, also became an artist and, around 1632, he was the teacher of the still-life painter, Paolo Porpora.
