= Francesco Antonio Cicalese =

Italian painter

Francesco Antonio Cicalese (active in Naples, 1642 -1685) was an Italian painter, mainly of still-life canvases. He was a pupil of Luca Forte.
