= Andrea Belvedere =

Italian painter

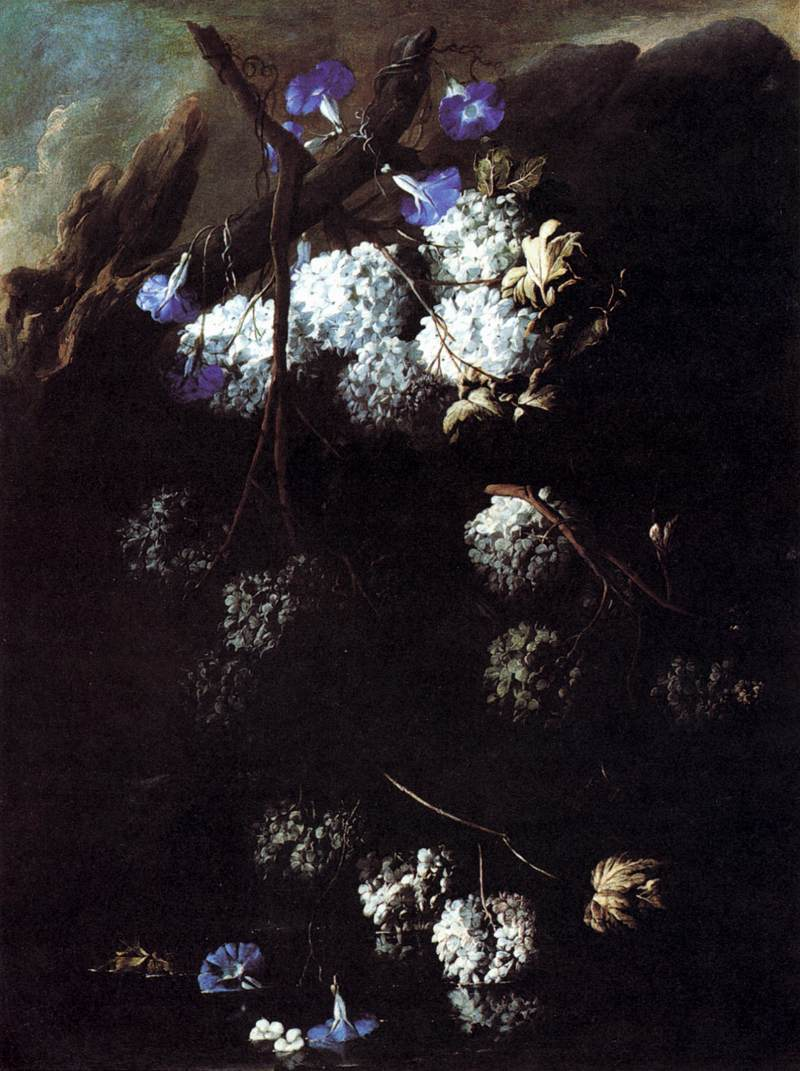
Morning glories and snowballs at water, 1680.

Abate Andrea Belvedere (born 1646) was an Italian painter of the Baroque period.

== Life and work ==
It is believed that the painter was born not in 1646, as De Dominici reported, but around 1652, based on the discovery, by Prota Giurleo, of the act of death from which it appears that he died in Naples on 27 June 1732 at the age "of 80 years".

The pictorial activity of Andrea Belvedere took place for twenty years, from about 1674 to 1694, the year in which he, evidently preceded by his notoriety, moved to Spain, called by King Charles II. His work at Spanish court continued until 1700, but on his return to Naples, Belvedere abandoned painting to devote himself completely to theatrical activity.

Later Belvedere departed from the style of Paolo Porpora, that is, from works with Caravaggio-like period of still lives and flowers, apparently rejecting their mere "decorative" value. He appears to have been influenced by Giuseppe Recco and never rhetorical "Baroque" exuberance of Giovan Battista Ruoppolo, deriving from them an exalting sense of light and vitality.

Belvedere was described as the only great painter of still life at a time when in Naples this genre was rapidly declining. His originality of his art attracted a considerable number of younger artists.

When he moved to Spain in 1692, he was employed by Charles II of Spain; and in conjunction with Luca Giordano (who painted the figures), he helped decorate the Escorial. Napier describes Belvedere as imitator, yet also a competitor of the Flemish still-life painter Abraham Brueghel. Among his pupils or followers were Gasparo Lopez, Baldassare de Caro, Tommaso Realfonso, and Nicola Casissa.

Among the works we should mention above all:

- Flower Wreath (Sorrento, Museo Correale), datable around 1670;
- the two "pendants" Bottle with Tulips and Bottle with Carnations (Sorrento, Museo Correale);
- the Peonies (Sorrento, Museo Correale), to be placed between 1670 and 1680;
- Carnations and Tulips and Carnations ( "Duca di Martina" Museum in Naples);
- Pisces (signed, the only painting not of flowers, under the influence of Recco) (the Museum of S. Martino in Naples);
- then follows the extraordinary picture with a flowery branch of elderberry commonly known as Oriensie, (the Museum of Capodimonte (mentioned by De Dominici in Valletta house));
- Ducks and Flowers (Florence, Palazzo Pitti, signed);
- Flowers, Fruit and Ducks (Sorrento, Museo Correale);
- Flowers in the Copper Basin and the Flowers, Fruit, Birds (Sorrento, Museo Correale) between 1690 and 1695;
- Flowers Around a Herm (Stibbert Museum in Florence).
