= Giacomo Nani =

Giacomo Nani can refer to:

People

- Giacomo Nani (painter) (1698–1755), Venetian painter
- Giacomo Nani (admiral) (1725–1797), Venetian admiral and politician

Naval vessels

- Giacomo Nani, a Barbarigo-class submarine launched in 1919
- Giacomo Nani, a Marcello-class submarine launched in 1938
