= Luca Forte =

Italian painter

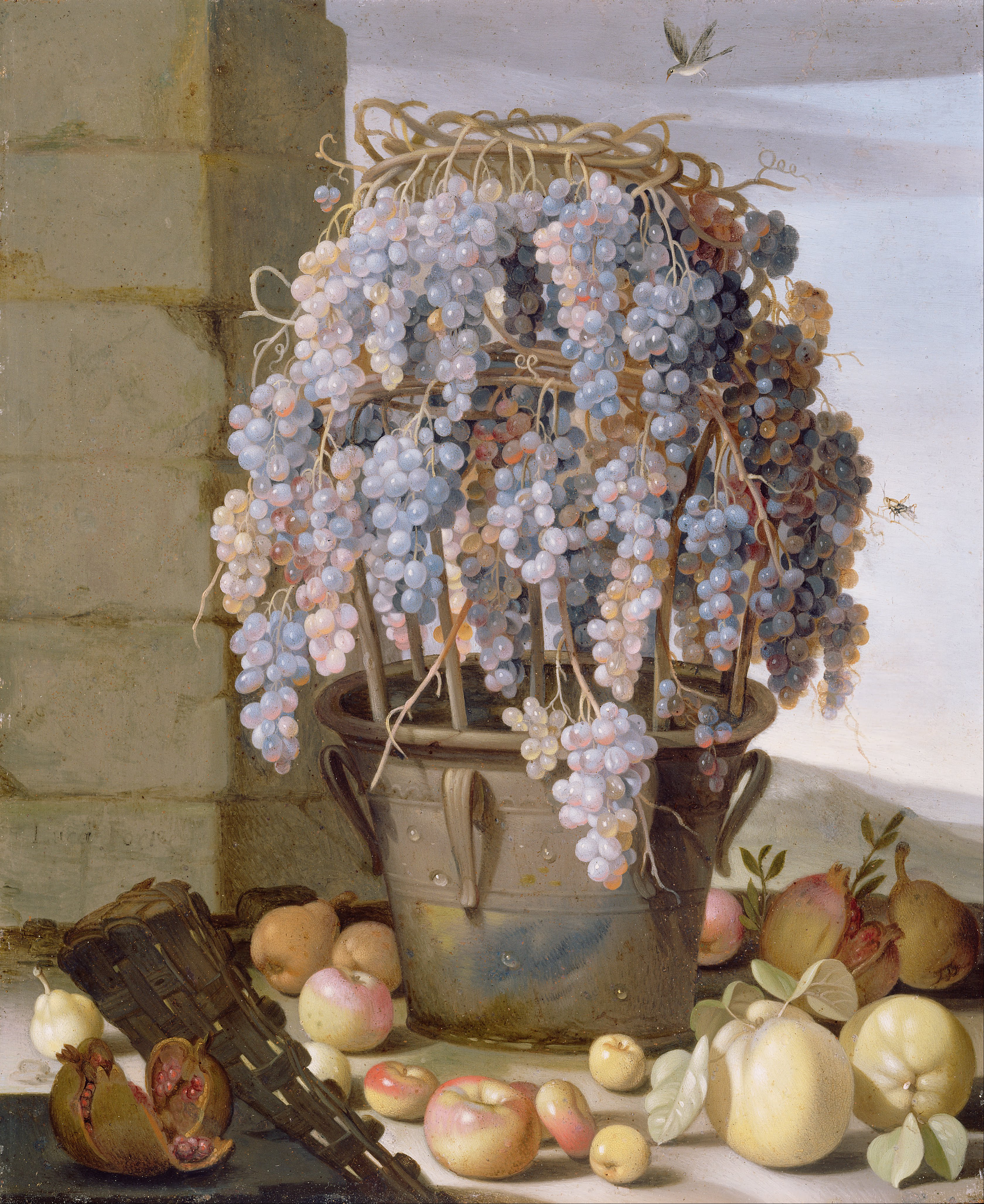
- Still Life with Grapes and Other Fruits, Getty Center, 1630s
- Born: Giovanni Battista Ruoppolo c. 1615; Naples, Kingdom of Naples
- Died: c. 1670; Naples, Kingdom of Naples
- Education: Aniello Falcone
- Known for: Still life
- Movement: Baroque

Luca Forte (c. 1615—c. 1670) was an Italian painter of the Baroque period, active mainly as a still life painter in Naples.

== Biography ==
Luca Forte was born in Naples around 1615. Little documentary evidence exists about him. He was a witness to the marriage of Aniello Falcone in 1639, and collaborated on a project with Falcone. He specialized in still lifes, often rich in fruits, as opposed to flowers, and he is regarded as one of the main exponents of the genre. His work was influenced by that of contemporary artists active in Naples, such as Paolo Porpora, Giovan Battista Ruoppolo, and Pietro Paolo Bonzi.

The most important works for establishing Forte’s stylistic chronology are the Still life with Tuberose and Crystal Goblet (Palazzo Corsini, Rome), a schematized and apparently early composition, and three signed canvases (Sarasota, Ringling Museum of Art; London, Matthiesen Gallery; Marano di Castenaso, M. Pradelli priv. col.), which are unanimously ascribed to the decade after 1640 and thus represent his middle period. In these works the composition is complex and articulated, the light is still and the contrasts between light and shadow marked; they are executed with minute attention to detail. Closely related are two small octagonal canvases of Cherries, Strawberries and Other Fruit and Apples and Pears (both Naples, Museo di Capodimonte).

To this same period or very shortly after it are ascribed a pair of pendants featuring Lemons, Lemon Trees and Landscape and Dried Fruit, Flowers and Landscape (Florence, Leone Cei & Sons), in which landscape begins to play an important role. These are among the last attributable pictures and are masterpieces of delicacy and precision.

== Gallery ==
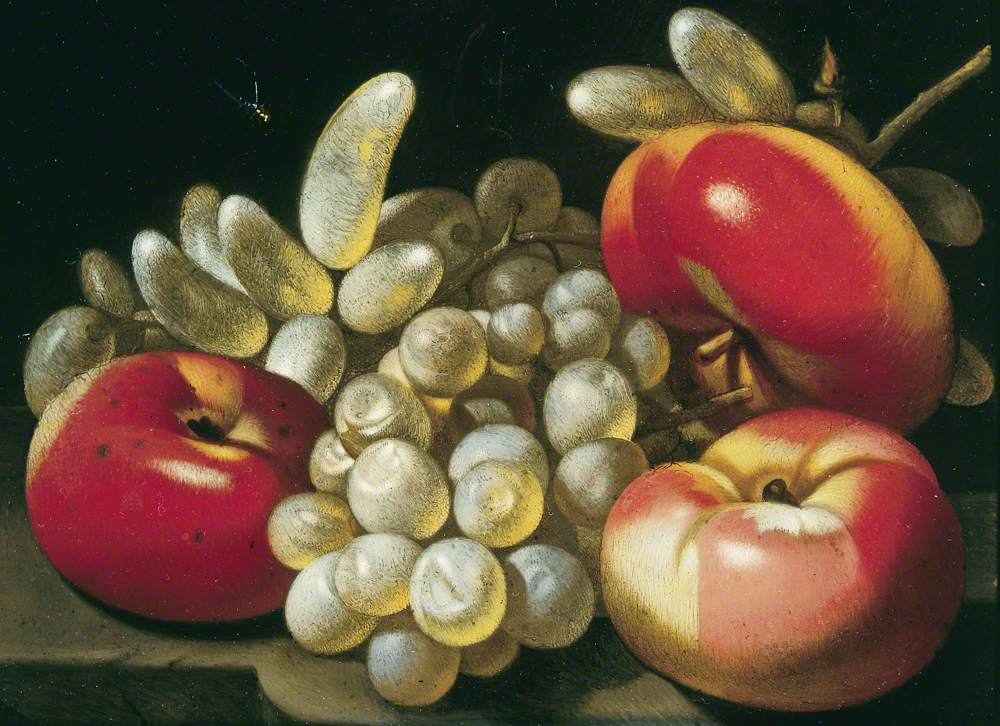
Still Life with Apples, Grapes and a Dragonfly, Compton Verney Art Gallery, Compton Verney

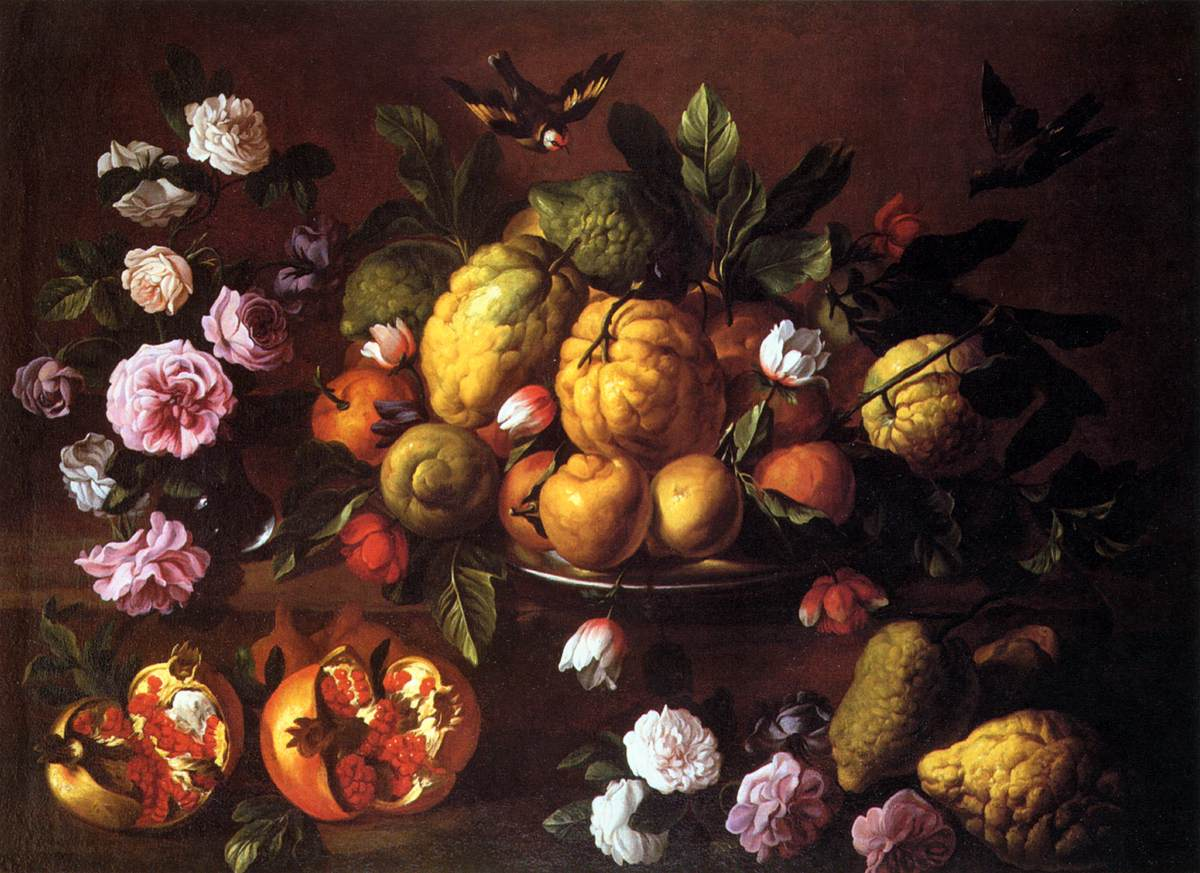
Still-Life, Matthiesen Gallery, London

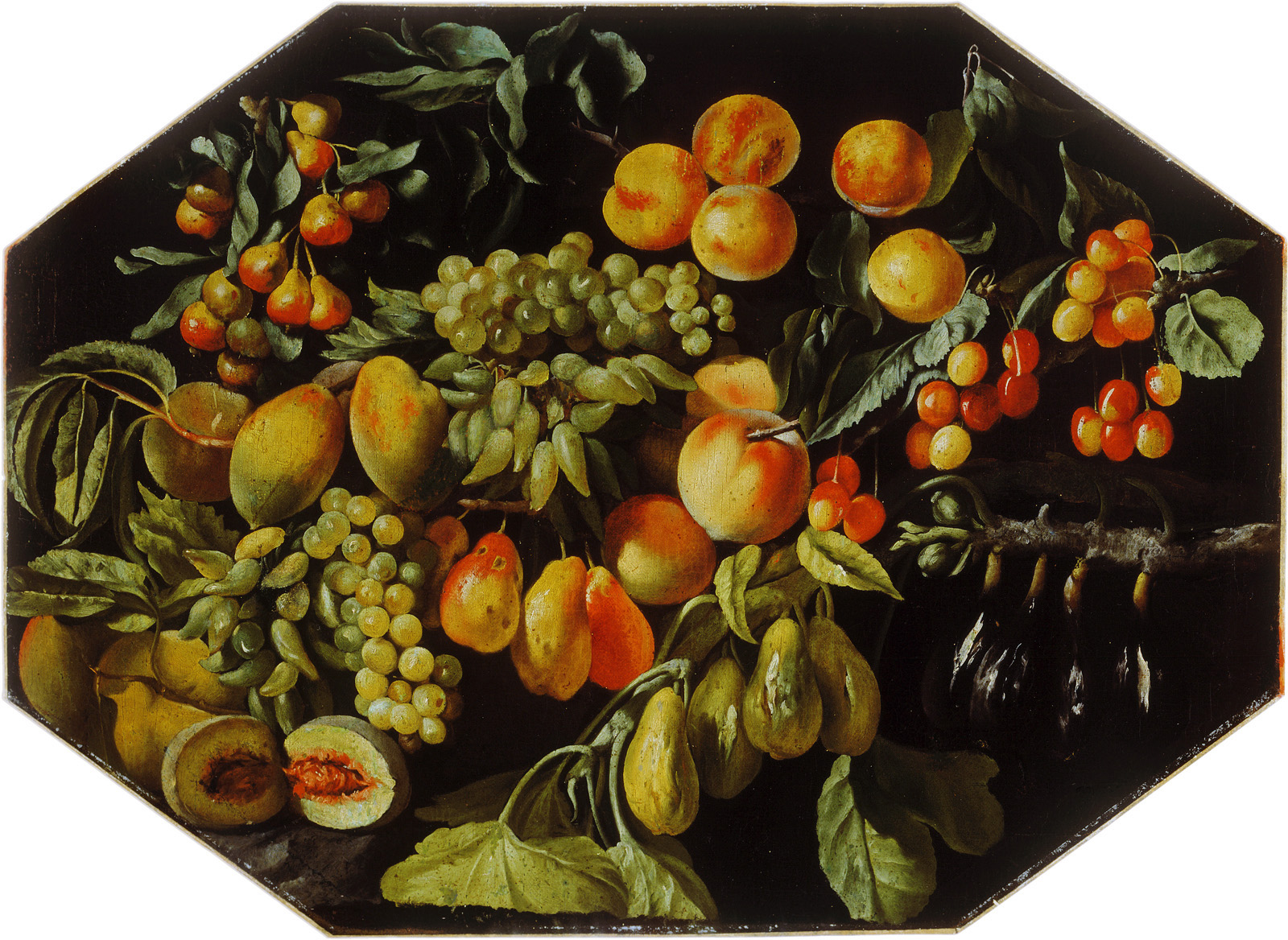
Still Life of Fruit, National Gallery of Slovenia, Ljubljana

== Bibliography ==
- Dominici, Bernardo de' (1743). Vite dei pittori, scultori ed architetti napoletani. Vol. III. Naples. p. 135.
- Causa, Raffaello (1962). "Luca Forte e il primo tempo della natura morta napoletana". Paragone. 13 (145): 41–8.
