= Giovanni Battista Recco =

Italian still-life painter

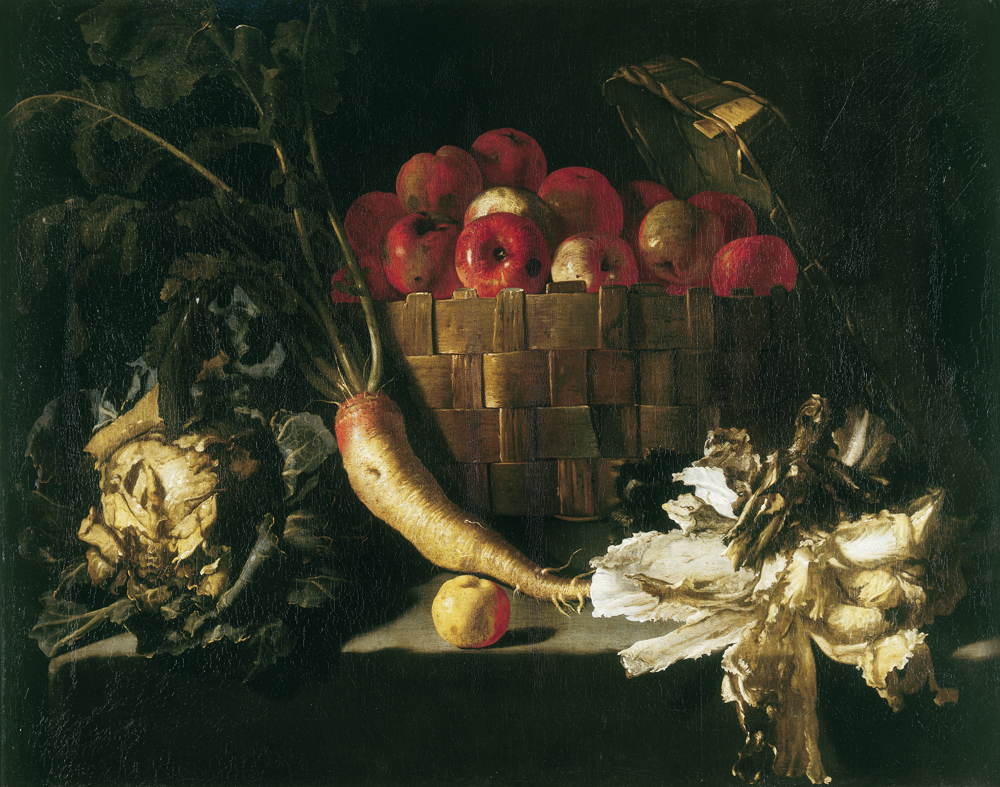
Still-Life with Apples, Cabbage, Radish and Lettuce

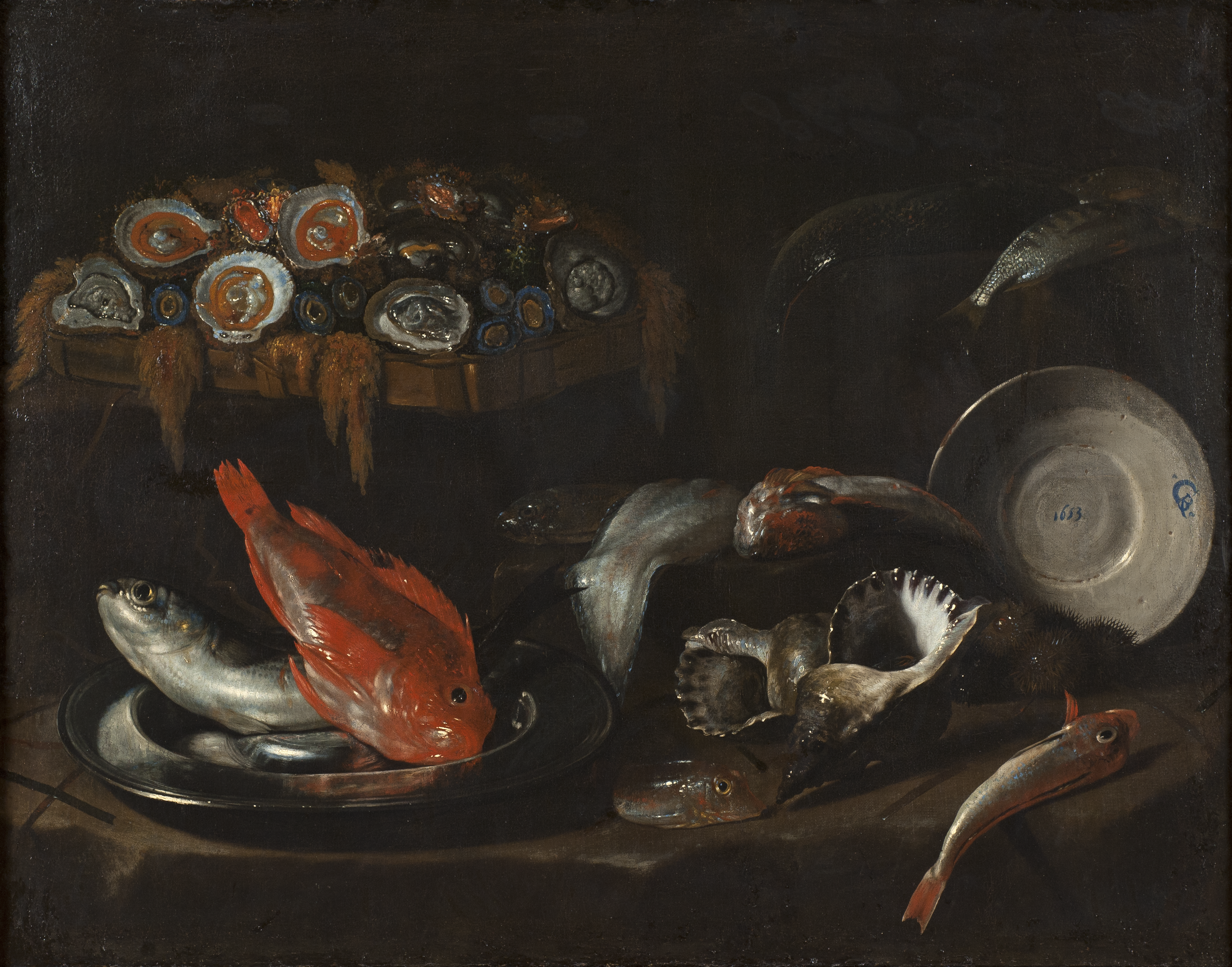
Stil-Life with Fish and Oysters

Giovanni Battista Recco (c.1615 – 1660) was an Italian still-life painter of the Neapolitan School.

== Biography ==
He was born in Naples. A member of the Recco family of artists, he is generally considered to be the brother of Giacomo Recco, making him the uncle of Giuseppe Recco, both of whom were also still-life painters.

Bernardo De Dominici, a biographer of Neapolitan artists, fails to mention him, but works signed by him were present in the inventories of such notable collections as those of the banker, Ferdinand van den Eynde, and Don Antonio Ruffo, of Messina. There is also a short note (c.1675) from the Florentine art critic, Filippo Baldinucci, describing Recco as a deceased "painter of fish". Other documents include payments for his works, from 1655 and 1656.

He was completely forgotten until 1961, when a museum official named Nolfo di Carpegna (1913–1996) noticed four stylistically similar paintings, signed with the monogram "G.B.R.". It may have been assumed that they were painted by a more familiar artist, Giovanni Battista Ruoppolo, but the addition of one other painting, with his full signature, established the connection. Six more signed paintings were discovered by the art historian, Raffaelo Causa (1923–1984), in 1972.

Recco's style is usually described as naturalistic and compared to Caravaggio, but is clearly influenced by the Bodegónes, in the style of Juan van der Hamen y León, and Sánchez Cotán. Several Spanish artists were residents of Naples at the time, and may have provided some inspiration.

Recco died in Naples in 1660.
