= Giacomo Nani (painter) =

Italian painter

Giacomo Nani (also called Jacopo Nani; 1698–1755) was an Italian painter, mainly of still-life paintings and of porcelain.

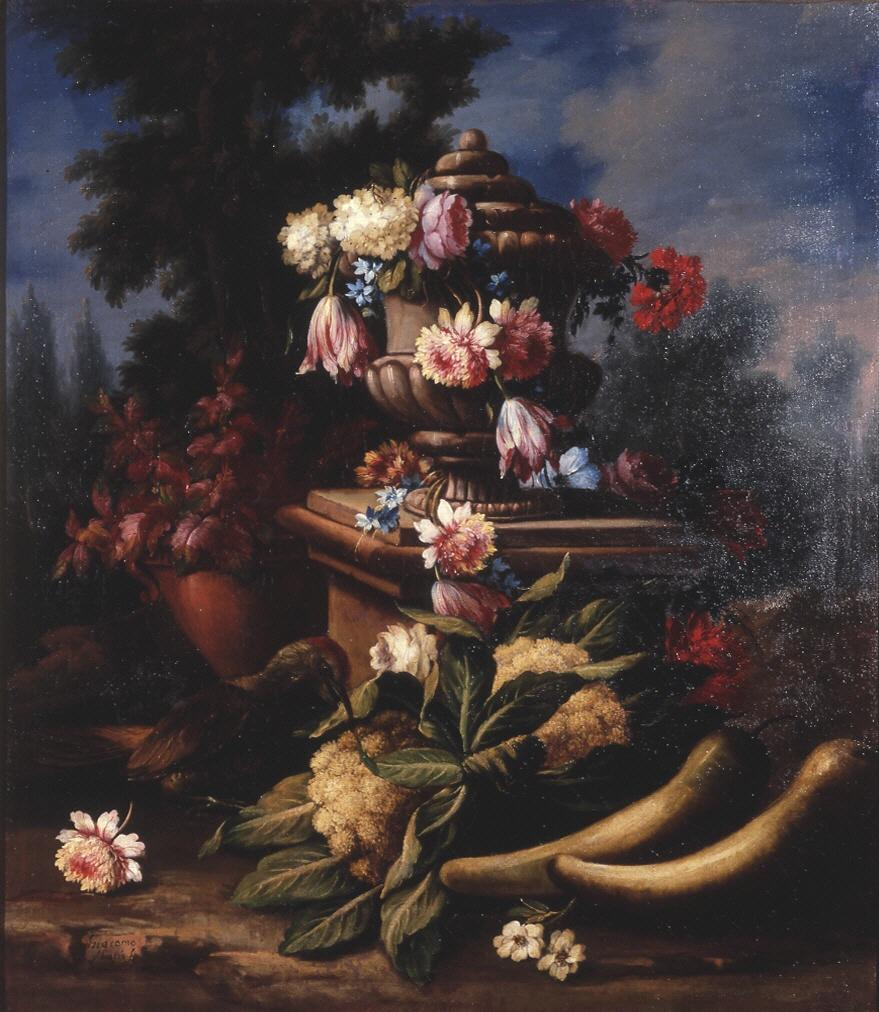
Vase with vegetables and bird, Real Academia de Bellas Artes de San Fernando, Madrid.

== Biography ==
He was born in Porto Ercole. According to De Dominici, he was a pupil of Andrea Belvedere and Gaspare Lopez. In marriage documents from 1726, he stated his trade as a painter. His older son, Mariano Nani, was a painter active in Spain. Works by Nani are listed in an inventory by the Duchess of Terranova in 1723, and by the Duke of Limatola in 1725. He is said to have collaborated with the figure painter Paolo de Matteis. Two dozen of his canvases, originally in the Royal Palace in Naples, were sent to Spain by the king Charles VII of Naples to his mother, the former Queen Isabella Farnese, and are presently conserved in the Royal Palace of Riofrío. Nani also made designs for the painting at the royal factory of Capodimonte porcelain founded in 1740. In 1754, the factory director, Giacomo Boschi, stated that for years, Nani had been employed in painting animals and natural objects. His son Mariano also worked at the factory as a decorator.

Nani died in 1755 in Naples. The Real Academia de Bellas Artes de San Fernando and the Prado Museum own paintings by Nani.
