= Giovan Battista Ruoppolo =

Italian painter

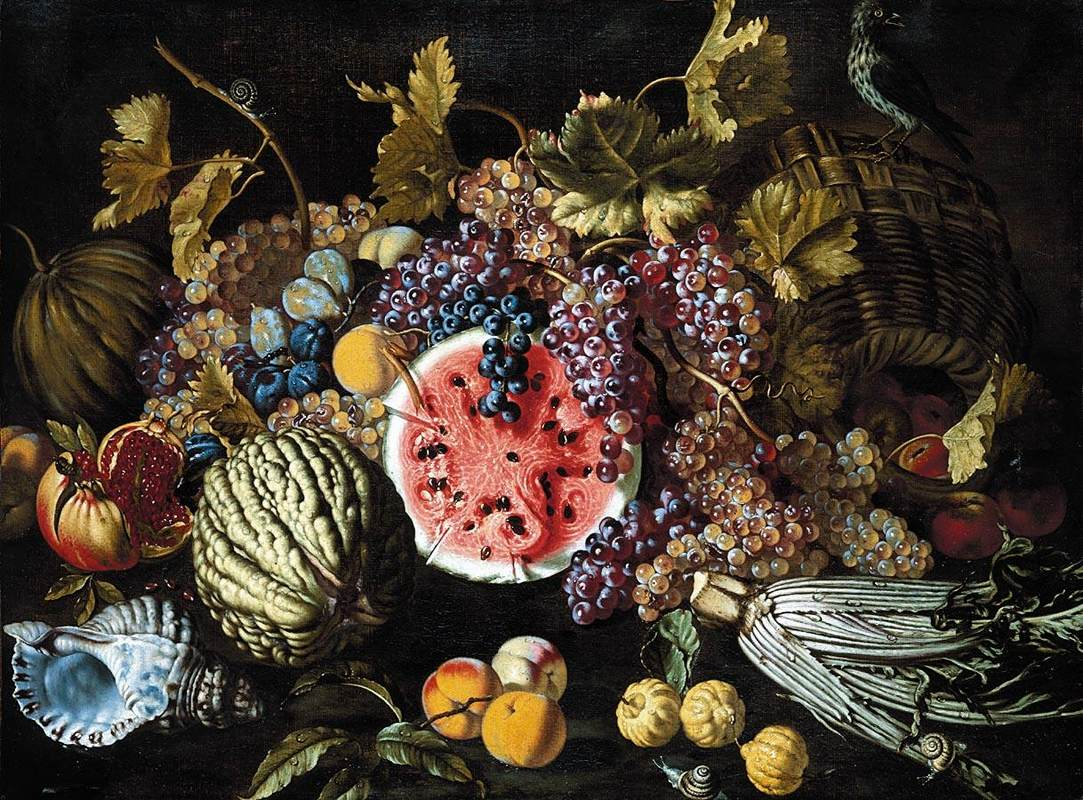
- Still life of fruit and a shell
- Born: Giovanni Battista Ruoppolo; 1629; Naples, Kingdom of Naples
- Died: 17 January 1693 (aged 63–64); Naples, Kingdom of Naples
- Resting place: Sant'Anna di Palazzo
- Education: Paolo Porpora
- Known for: Still-life
- Movement: Baroque

Giovan Battista Ruoppolo (1629 – 17 January 1693) was a Neapolitan painter of still-lifes. Ruoppolo was an important figure in Neapolitan still life painting in the second half of the 17th century, with numerous followers, and his pictures were collected by the aristocracy and wealthy merchant classes. In the past, confusion has arisen between Ruoppolo’s work and that attributed to the older artist Giovanni Battista Recco, because of their identical initials G.B.R.

== Life ==
=== Early life and education ===
Giovan Battista Ruoppolo was born in Naples in 1629. His father, Francesco Ruoppolo, was a maiolica-worker, as was also his father-in-law, Bernardo Congiusto, and his brother Carlo Ruoppolo was a painter of pictures and maiolica. Ruppolo was a pupil of Paolo Porpora (1617–1673), contemporary of Salvator Rosa who specialized in floral still lifes.

=== Early work ===
Ruppolo's early work was influenced by the naturalism of Luca Forte and Giovanni Battista Recco; he was also aware of the still life paintings from Rome indebted to Caravaggio. An important picture from this period is Still life with Celery and Guelder Roses (c. 1650–55; Oxford, Ashmolean Museum), which was followed by a group of pictures, still naturalistic, such as Still life (1661; Bergamo, Galleria Lorenzelli). During the 1660s Ruoppolo assimilated new compositional formulae, partly based on the most typical work of his contemporary Giuseppe Recco, for example Fish on the Beach (1660s; Naples, National Museum of San Martino), partly inspired by Roman still life painting, which was markedly Baroque, and above all by the works of Mario Nuzzi and of Michelangelo Campidoglio (1610–70).

=== Mature work ===
Ruoppolo’s paintings in his mature and later years are generally large and characterized by lavish decorative detail, which can be repetitive yet remains clear and naturalistic. This development is related to the presence in Naples from 1675 of the Antwerp painter Abraham Brueghel, son of Jan Brueghel the Younger, the last representative of the great family of artists and an exponent of the most modern Baroque style. Among Ruoppolo’s most important later works (1660s–1670s) are Fish and Grapes (Lofstede, Museum), the compositions with Grapes (Sorrento, Museo Correale Terranova; Musée des Arts Décoratifs, Paris), a Still life with Fruit (Naples, priv. col.) and the canvas Fruit and Vegetables (Naples, priv. col.).

Ruoppolo died in Naples on 17 January 1693 and was buried in the church of Sant'Anna di Palazzo. His pupils included Onofrio Loth and Aniello Ascione. In addition, he influenced Andrea Belvedere and Giacomo Nani. Giovanni Battista’s nephew Giuseppe Ruoppolo was also a painter of still life. Considerably less incisive than his uncle, he repeated both his titles and his subjects, easily lapsing into academic patterns and repetition.

== Gallery ==
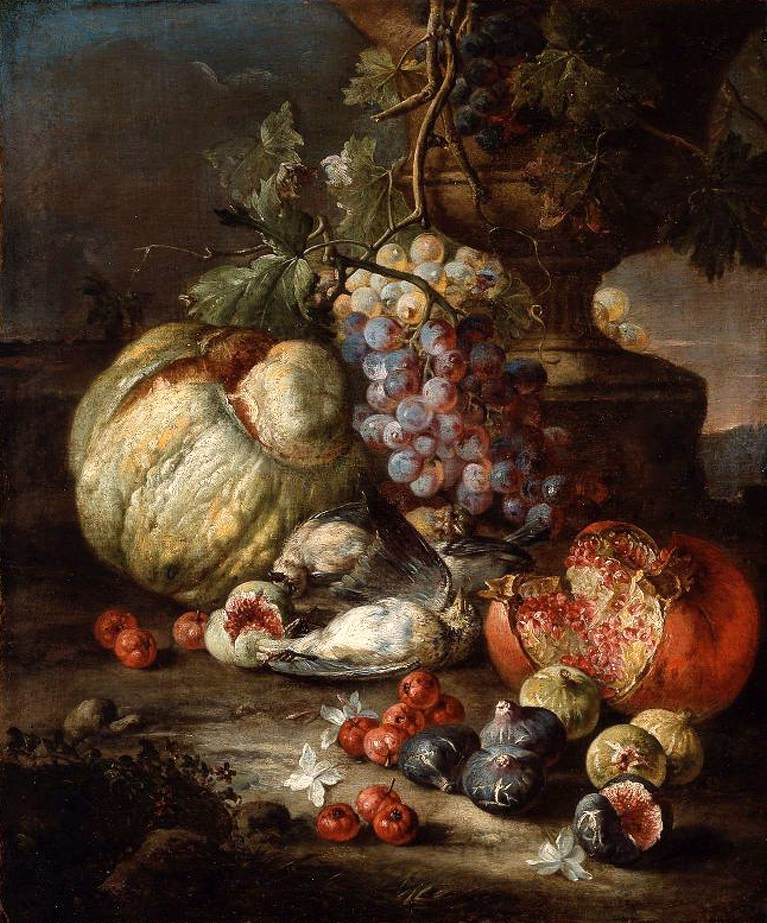
Fruit and Dead Birds in Landscape

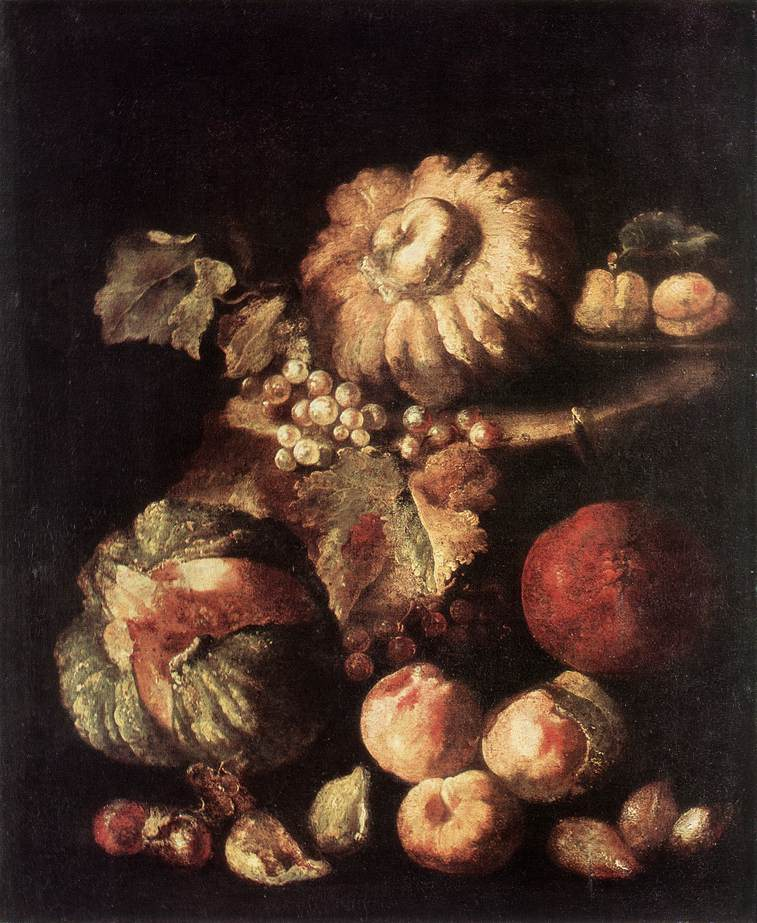
Fruit

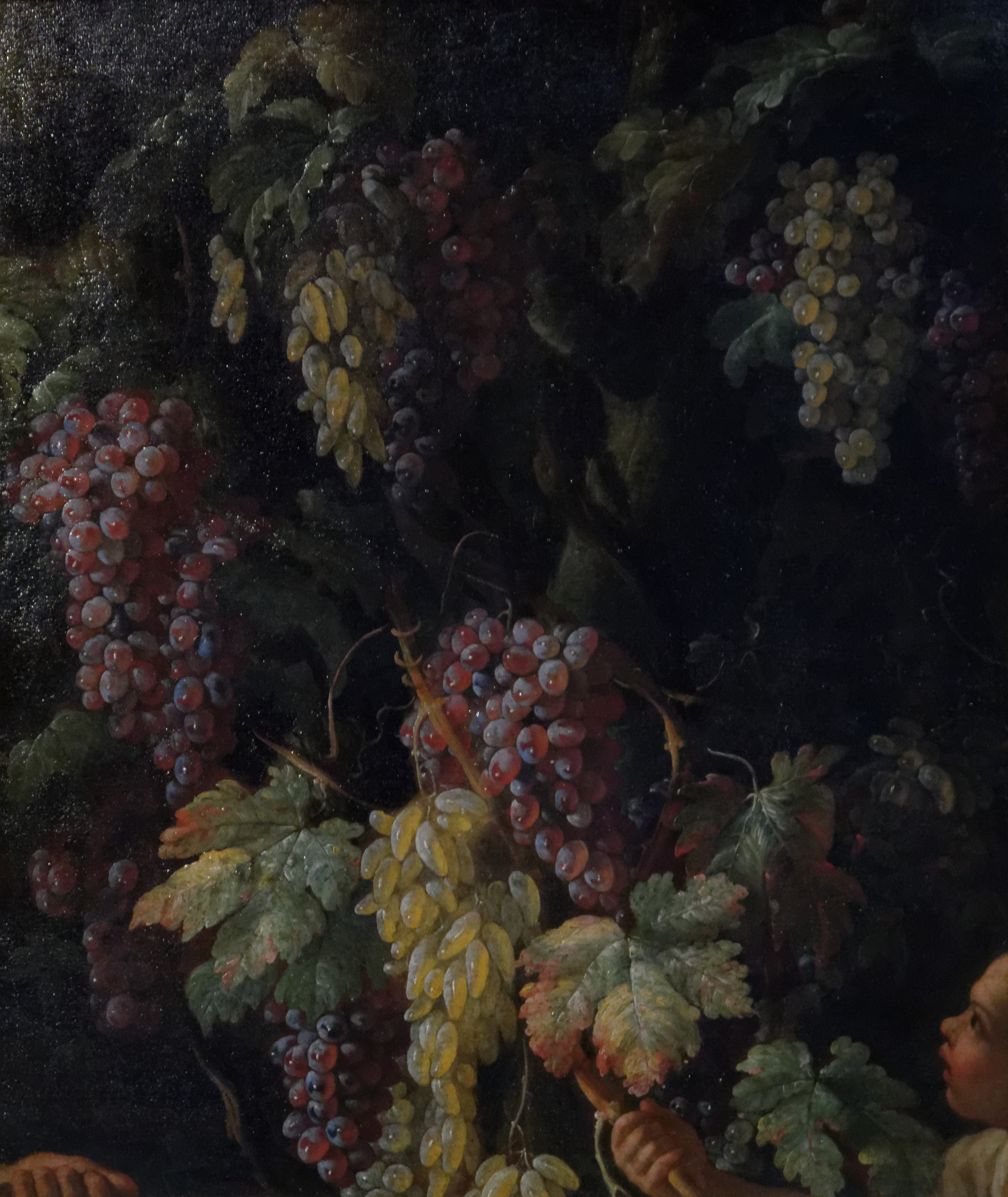
Bunches of Grapes around a Tree Trun

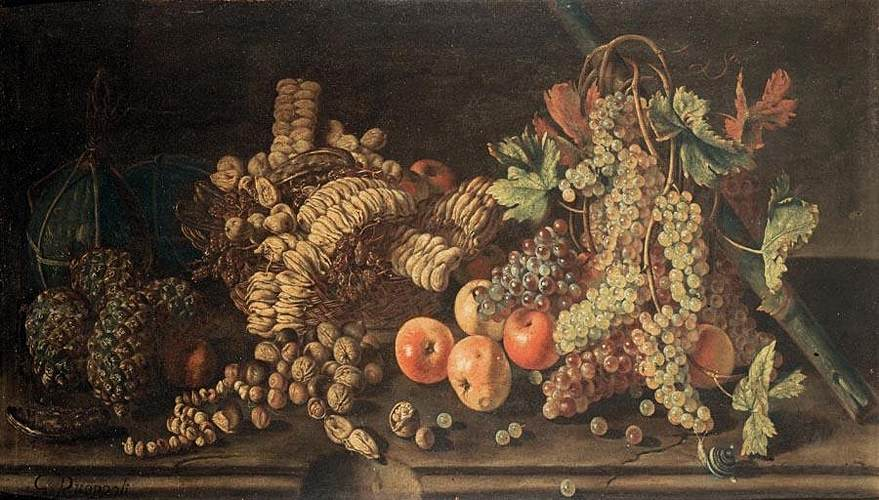
Snail, Fruit, Nuts, Grapes, and Pinecones

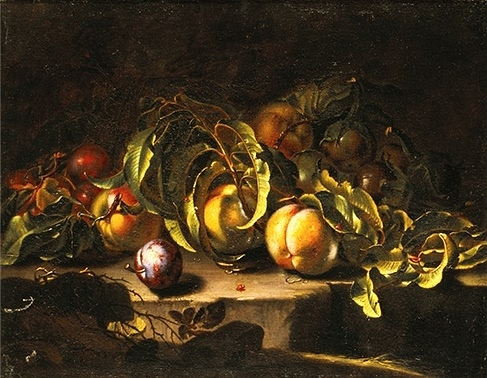
Still life with peaches

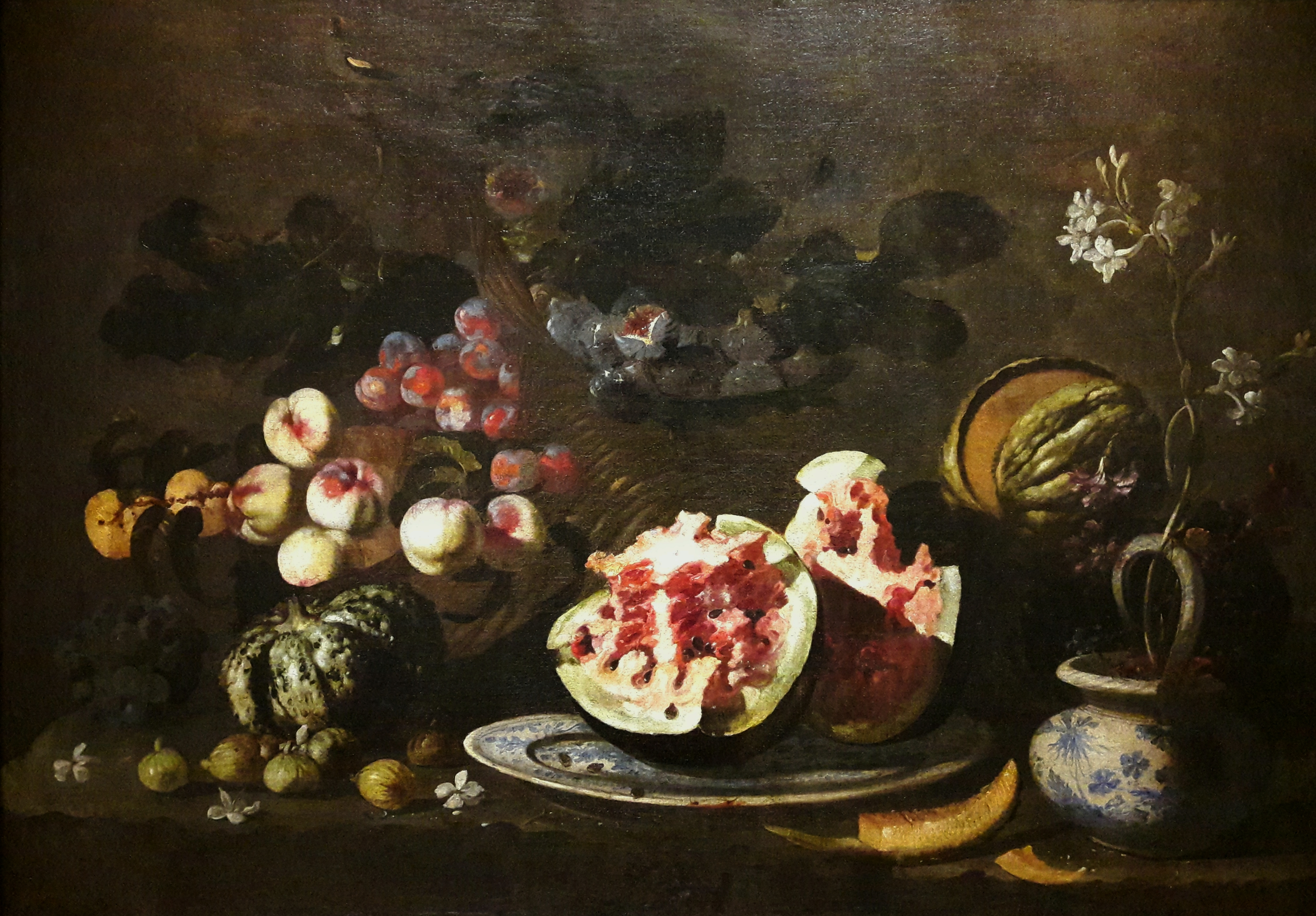
Still life with fruit

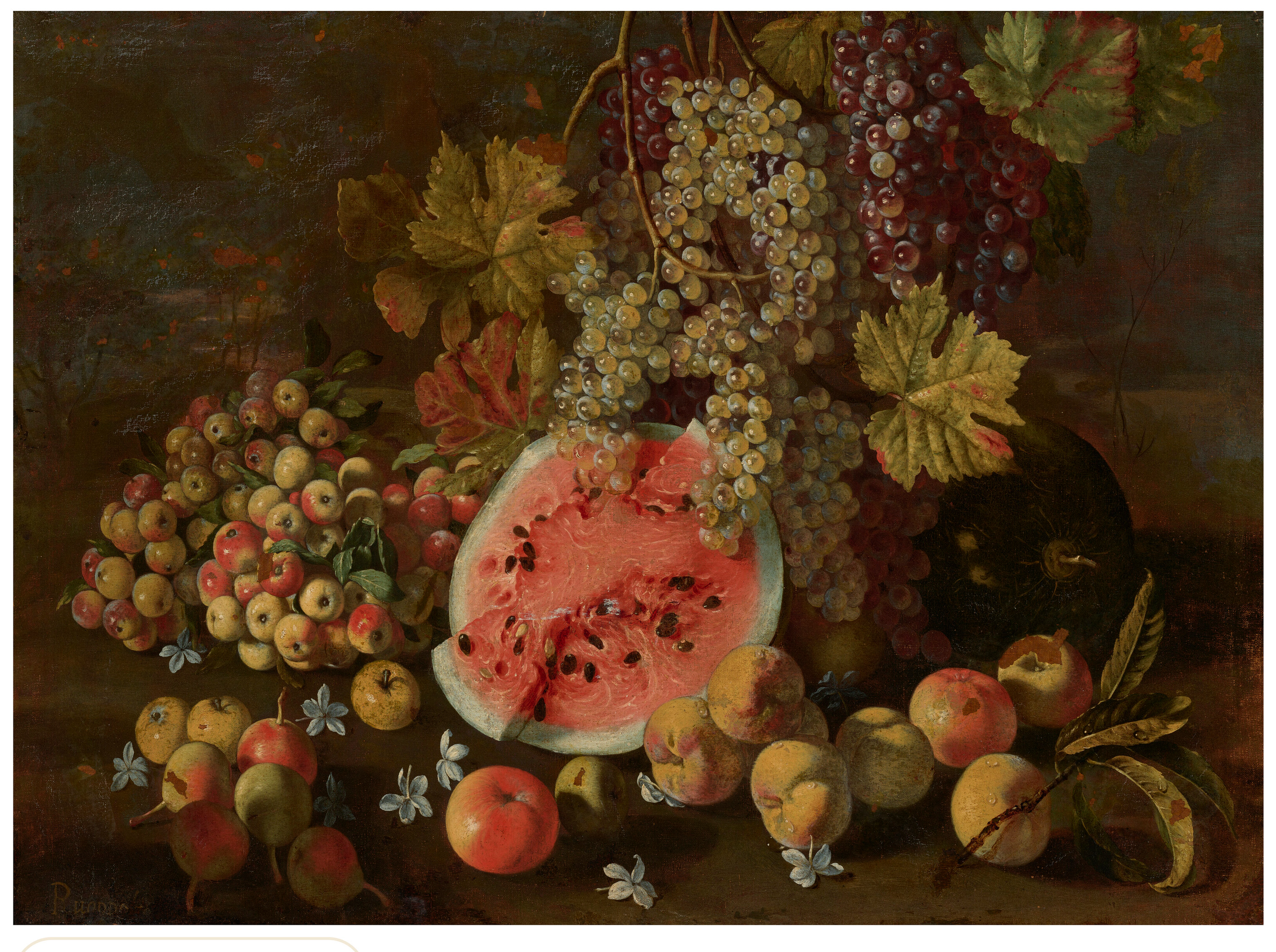
A watermelon apples pears and grapes

== Sources ==
- Wittkower, Rudolf (1980). Art and Architecture in Italy, 1600-1750. Pelican History of Art (Penguin Books Ltd). pp. 361–2.
