= Tommaso Realfonso =

Italian painter

Tommaso Realfonso (c. 1677 in Naples – after 1743) was an Italian painter of the 18th century, specializing studies of still life paintings of flower and fruit pieces. He also painted vedute or landscapes.

He was also called ‘’Masillo’’ by his master Andrea Belvedere, in whose studio he worked till 1694, when Belvedere moved to Spain. A still life attributed to Realfonso is found in the Museo Correale in Sorrento.
