= Sant'Anna di Palazzo =

Church of St. Anna di Palazzo
- Chiesa di Sant'Anna di Palazzo
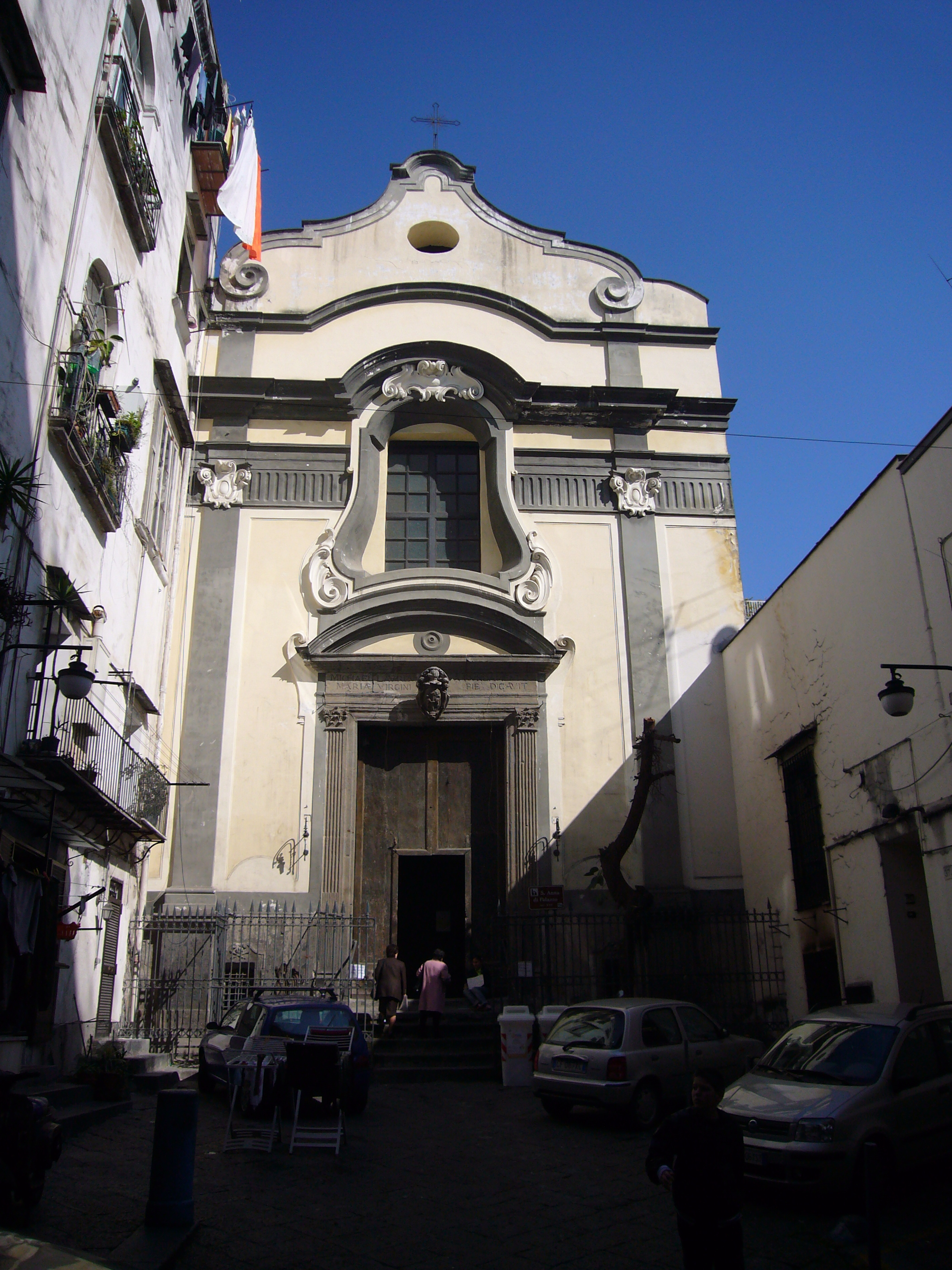
- The façade of Sant'Anna di Palazzo.
- Church of St. Anna di Palazzo
- 40.838255°N 14.245996°E
- Location: Vico Rosario di Palazzo; Naples; Province of Naples, Campania
- Country: Italy
- Denomination: Roman Catholic

History
- Status: Active

Architecture
- Architectural type: Church
- Style: Baroque architecture

Administration
- Diocese: Roman Catholic Archdiocese of Naples

Sant'Anna di Palazzo (or church of the Rosario di Palazzo) is a church in the quartiere of San Ferdinando in Naples, Italy.

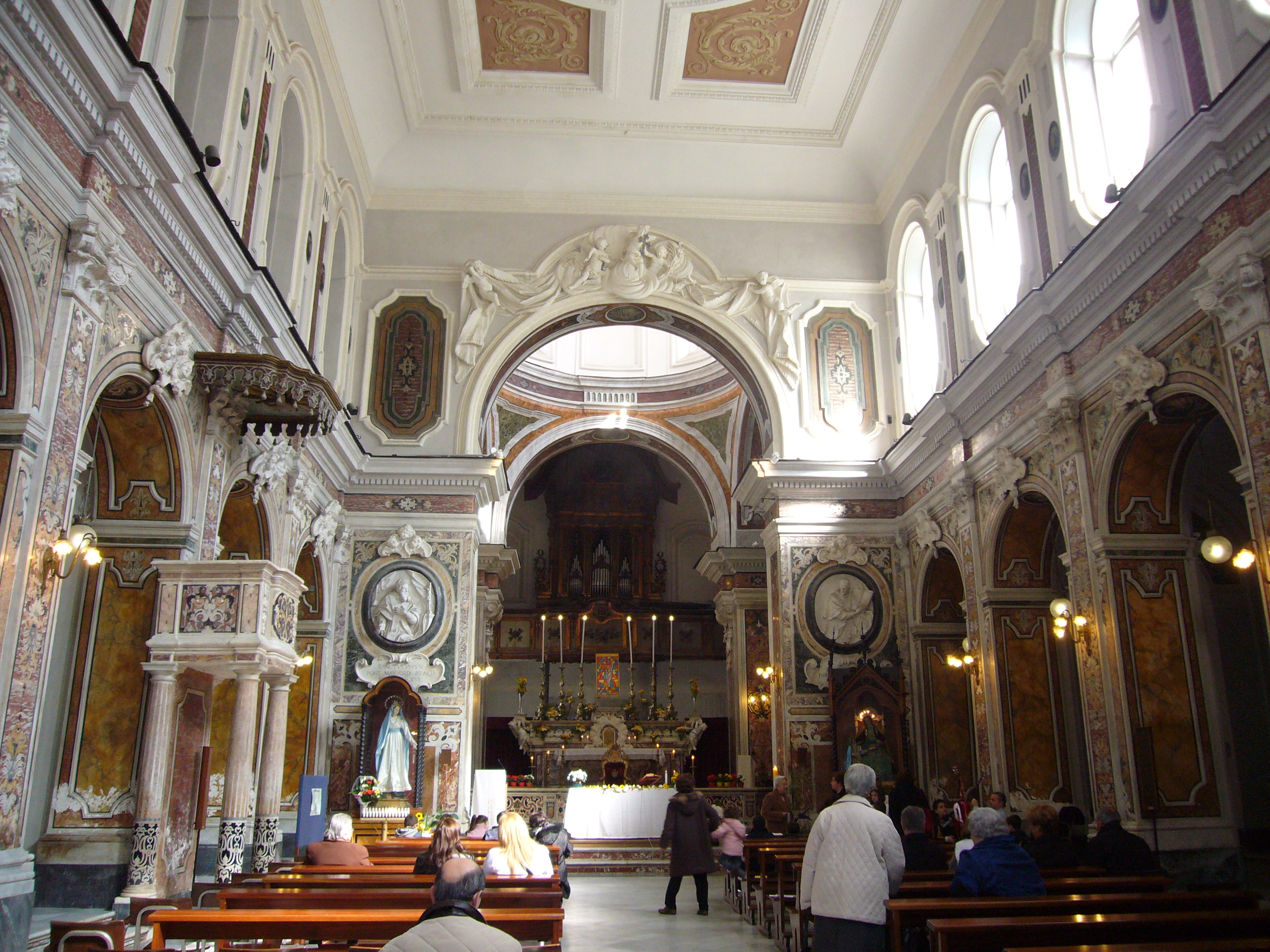
Interior

After the victory at the Lepanto, this church and Santa Maria della Vittoria in Naples were erected and dedicated to the Madonna del Rosario, whose devotion was felt to have contributed to the success at the battle. In 1572, Michele Lauro offered the Dominicans this land for construction of a church. In this time, this zone was exterior to the walls and less populated.

One of the leaders of the Parthenopean Republic, Eleonora Fonseca Pimentel was married here in February 1778, and later buried her son here. Luca Giordano was baptized in this church.

The facade (1706-1710) is attributed to Giovanni Battista Nauclerio. The stucco decorations date from the 17th century, but heavily restored in the 18th century. There are four bas-relief depictions of popes who helped establish the devotion of the rosary: Popes Benedict XI, Benedict XIII, Innocent V, and Pius V. The main altar (1729) created by Domenico Antonio Vaccaro. The main altarpiece is a Madonna del Rosario (c. 1738) by Giuseppe Bonito. The Rococo style sacristy (1739) was completed by Michelangelo Porzio. The dome, once tiled with Maiolica, dominates the skyline of the zone.

The church was severely damaged during bombardments in 1943.

== Bibliography ==
- Vincenzo Regina, Le chiese di Napoli. Viaggio indimenticabile attraverso la storia artistica, architettonica, letteraria, civile e spirituale della Napoli sacra, Newton and Compton editor, Naples 2004.
