= Aniello Falcone =

Italian Baroque painter

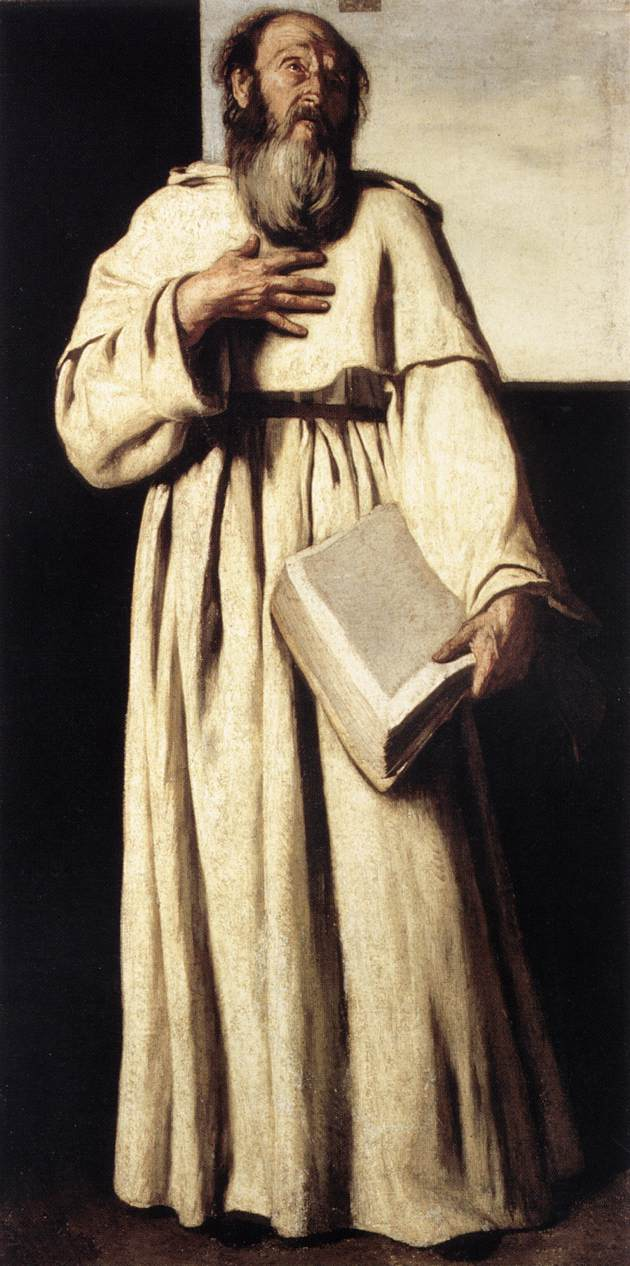
- The Anchorite, c. 1650, Galleria Nazionale d'Arte Antica, Rome
- Born: 15 November 1600; Naples, Kingdom of Naples
- Died: 1656 (aged 55–56); Naples, Kingdom of Naples
- Education: Jusepe de Ribera
- Movement: Baroque

Aniello Falcone or Ancillo Falcone (15 November 1600 – 1656) was an Italian Baroque painter, active in Naples and noted for his painted depictions of battle scenes.

== Biography ==
=== Early life and education ===
Born in Naples to a tradesman, he showed his artistic tendency at an early age. He first received some instruction from a relative, before becoming a pupil of Jusepe de Ribera. Bernardo de' Dominici records a journey to Rome, and Falcone's early works include genre paintings influenced by artists working in Rome, such as Pieter van Laer and Michelangelo Cerquozzi, and, equally importantly, by works painted by Diego Velázquez in Italy (1629–30); it was perhaps through Falcone that the painting of bambocciate (low-life scenes) spread to Naples.

His early Schoolmistress (New York, Wildenstein's) is a harshly naturalistic work with strong contrasts of light and dark. The theme of St. Lucy Distributing Alms (Naples, Museo di Capodimonte) is religious, yet Falcone painted a scene from everyday life. The saint and her companions give alms to tattered, disabled beggars in a Neapolitan street, and the group is portrayed with a warmth and dignity reminiscent of Velázquez and Louis Le Nain.

Falcone also painted in fresco and received several official commissions. In the frescoes in the chapel of St. Agatha in San Paolo Maggiore, Naples and in the signed Rest on the Flight into Egypt (1641; Naples Cathedral) Falcone began to move towards an academic style influenced by Romano-Bolognese classicism, developing it further in frescoed scenes from the Life of St. Ignatius in the sacristy of the Gesù Nuovo in Naples. In these pictures, and in the battle scenes of the 1640s, Falcone's handling became more painterly, and his richer colour and warmer light suggest a response to Nicolas Poussin and to Giovanni Benedetto Castiglione.

=== Maturity ===
Falcone won international renown as a specialist in battle scenes, their subjects taken from both biblical and secular history, and was nicknamed L'Oracolo delle Battaglie. His works attracted the attention of the Flemish dealer and collector Gaspar Roomer, who sold his work across Europe, and he was one of the artists commissioned by Philip IV of Spain to paint a series of scenes from ancient Roman history for the Buen Retiro palace.

Falcone created the ‘battle scene without a hero’ (Saxl): he showed the battle as a brutal, confused struggle between anonymous troops, without heroes, without defeats and without particular historical incidents. The Battle between Turks and Christians (1621; Paris, Louvre) is one of the earliest. The frieze-like composition is elaborately structured, yet the picture is rich in intensely naturalistic, vividly coloured details of armour and weapons and precisely observed expressions of anger and pain.

=== The revolution of 1647 and later life ===
During the insurrection against Spanish rule led by Masaniello in 1647, he resolved to be bloodily avenged for the death, at the hands of two Spaniards, of a nephew and of a pupil in the school of art which he had established in Naples. He joined Salvator Rosa, Carlo Coppola, and others in an armed band called the Compagnia della Morte ("Company of Death").

When the revolt was crushed, Falcone and Rosa made off to Rome, where Borgognone noticed the works of Falcone, and became his friend, and a Frenchman induced him to go to France, where Louis XIV became one of his patrons. Ultimately, Jean-Baptiste Colbert obtained permission for the painter to return to Naples, where he died during the plague of 1656. His pupils included Salvator Rosa and Carlo Coppola, Domenico Gargiulo (known as Micco Spadaro), Paolo Porpora and Andrea di Leone.

=== Drawings ===
Falcone was an important draughtsman. His favoured medium was red chalk, and he interpreted the red chalk drawings of Ribera in a more subtle and more pictorial manner. By 1636, he was holding a life drawing class in his studio over the winter months, and his academic nude drawings (for example, Paris, Louvre, 7623) are forcefully modelled and sharply outlined. Many preparatory studies for the battle scenes survive, among them copies of drawings by Leonardo da Vinci; they include horsemen and strongly characterized heads of shouting men and warriors. He also made landscape drawings, and the naturalism of the landscape backgrounds in his battle scenes is indebted to these informal studies.

== Selected works ==
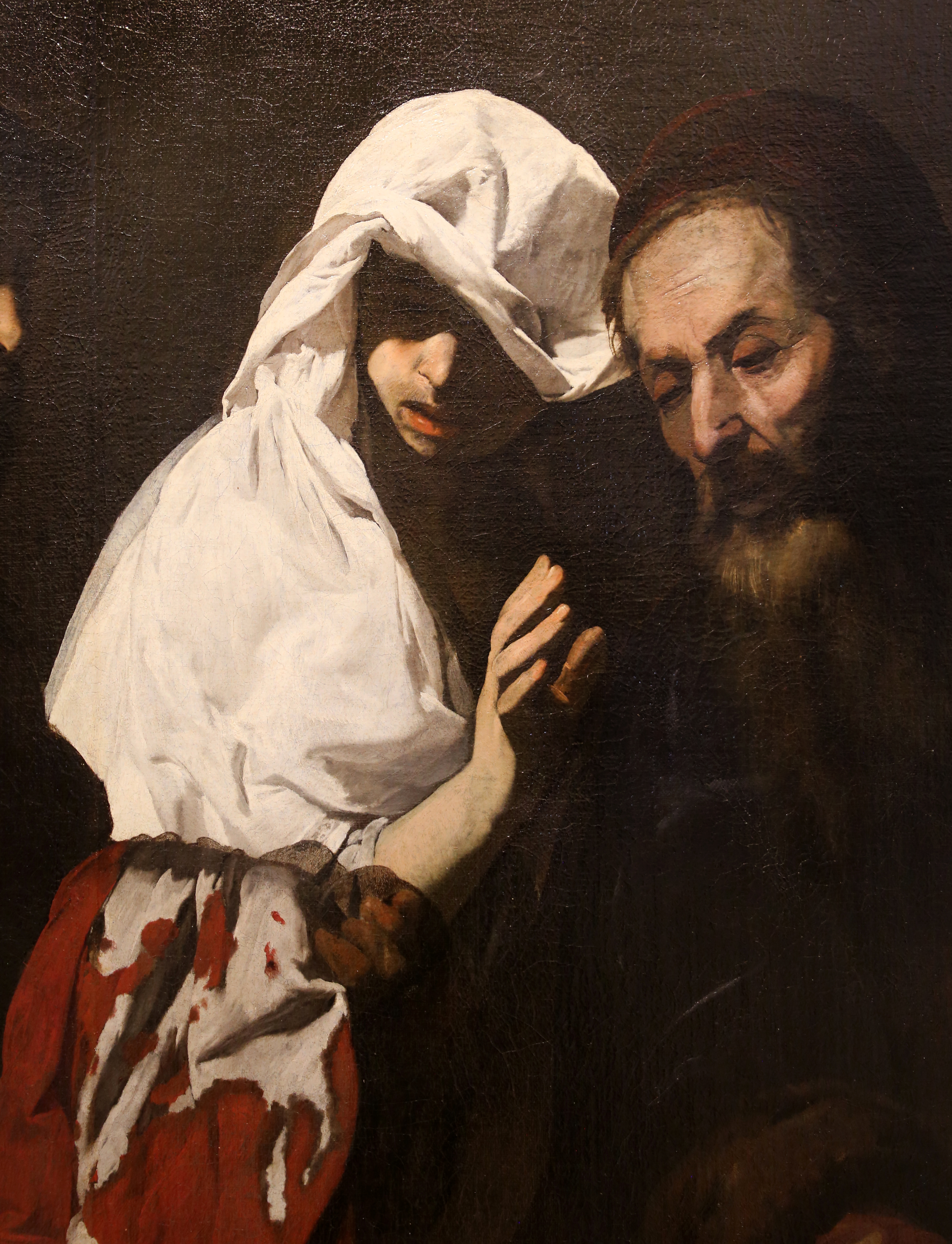
Jacob contemplates the bloodied clothes of his son Joseph (Detail), 1630-31, Lanfranchi Palace, Matera

- The Charity of Saint Lucy, 1630, oil on canvas, 75 × 86 cm, Museo di Capodimonte, Naples;
- Battle of Turks and Christians, 1631, Louvre, Paris;
- The school teacher, 1631, Museo di Capodimonte, Naples;
- Jacob contemplates the bloodied clothes of his son Joseph, 1630-31, Lanfranchi Palace, Matera;
- The Anchorite (c. 1650), Galleria Nazionale d'Arte Antica, Rome;
- The frescoes (1652) on the vault of the sacristy of the Gesù Nuovo, Naples;
- The Concert, Museo del Prado, Madrid;
- Roman Soldiers in the Circus, Museo del Prado, Madrid;
- The expulsion of the merchants from the Temple, Museo del Prado, Madrid;
- Supper at Emmaus, Musée des Beaux-Arts de Strasbourg;
- Rest on the Flight into Egypt, Naples Cathedral;
- Entombment of Christ, Cooper Hewitt, Smithsonian Design Museum, New York;
- Portrait of Masaniello, National Museum of San Martino, Naples.
Aniello Falcone

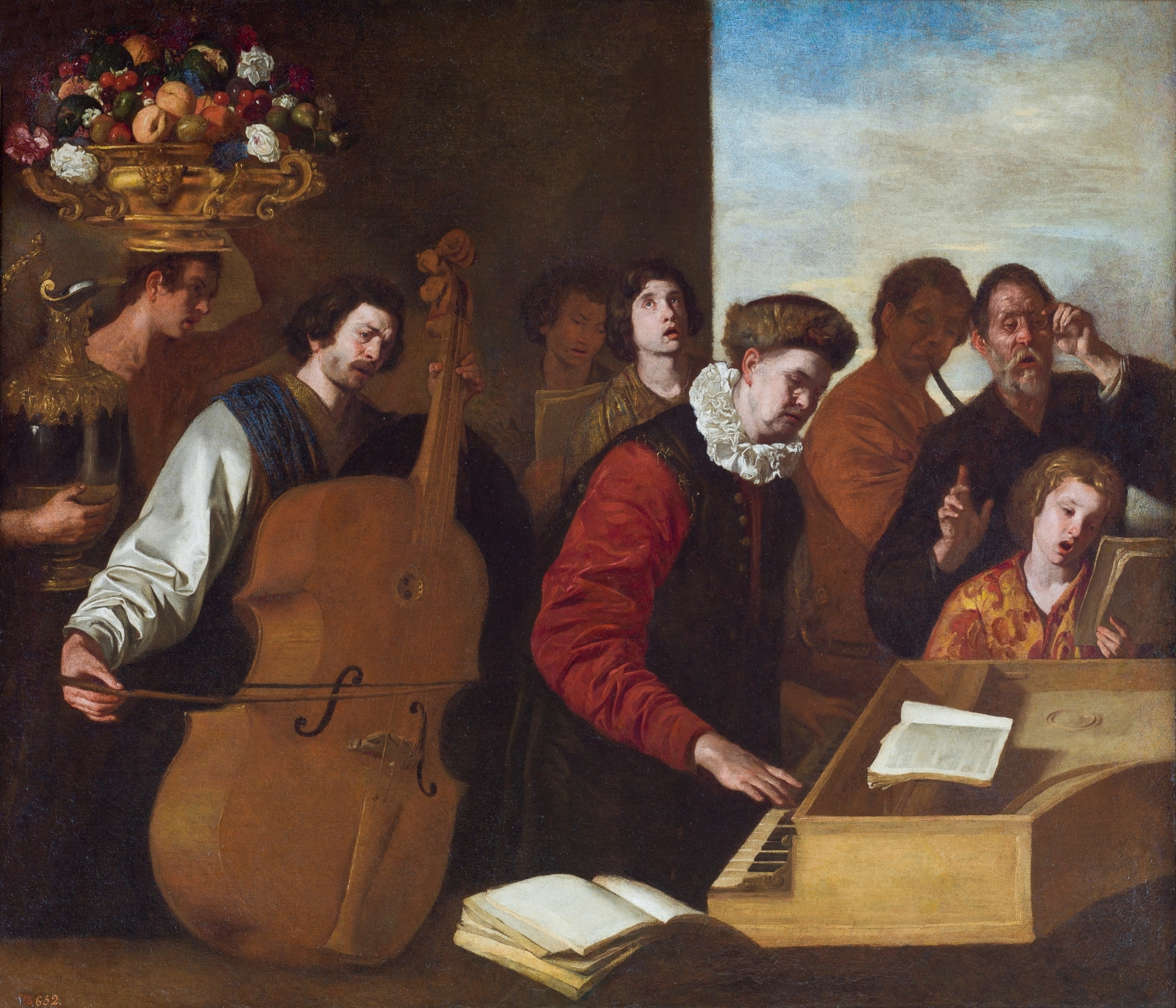
The Concert, Museo del Prado, Madrid

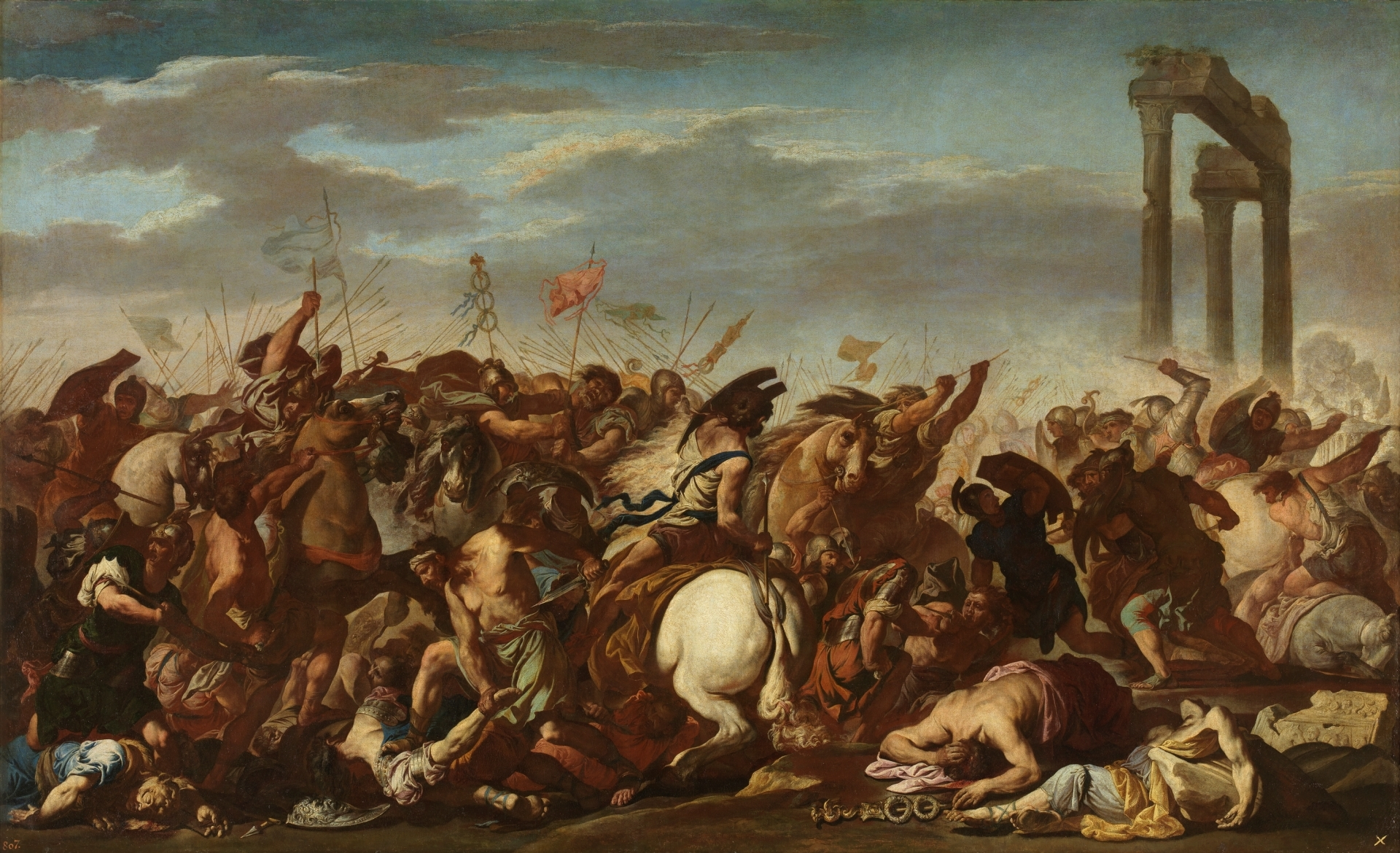
Battle scene, Museo del Prado, Madrid

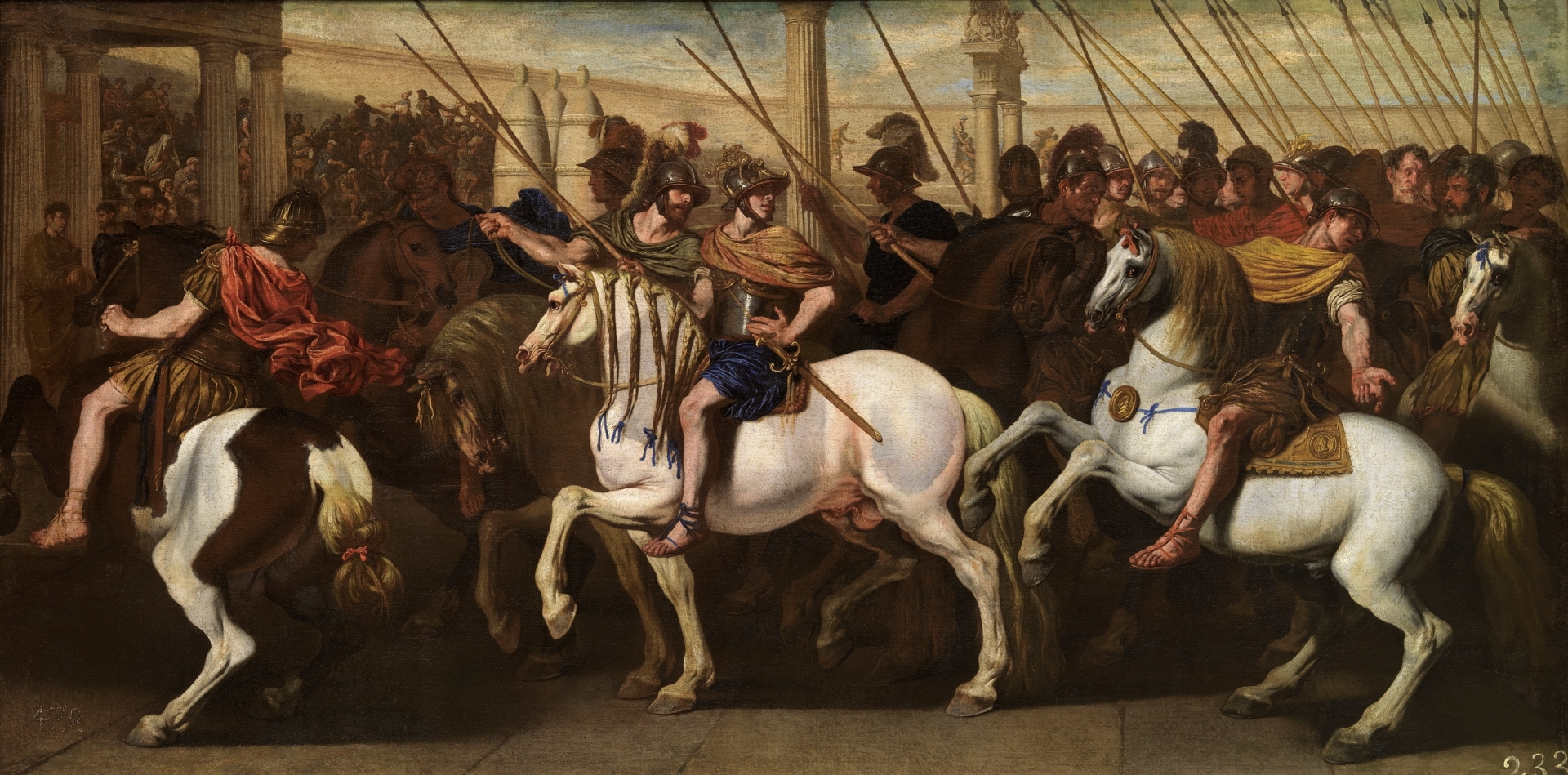
Roman Soldiers in the Circus, Museo del Prado, Madrid

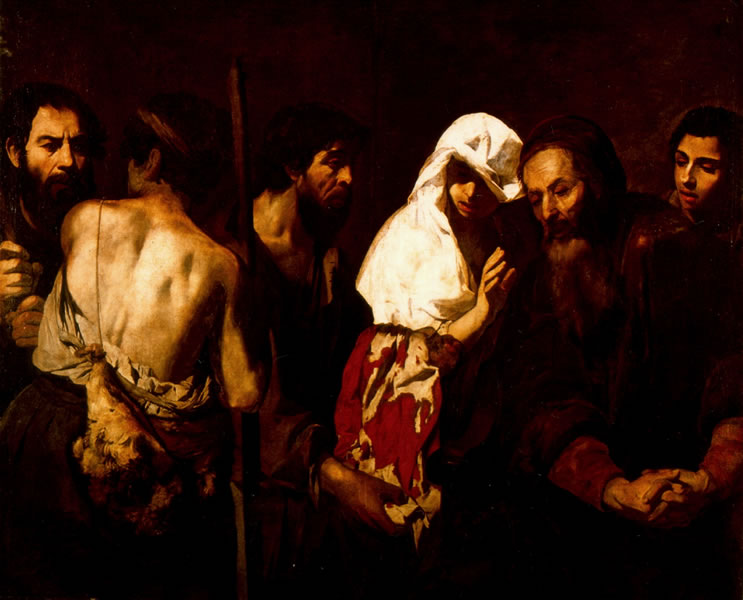
Jacob contemplates the bloodied clothes of his son Joseph, Museo nazionale d'arte medievale e moderna della Basilicata, Matera

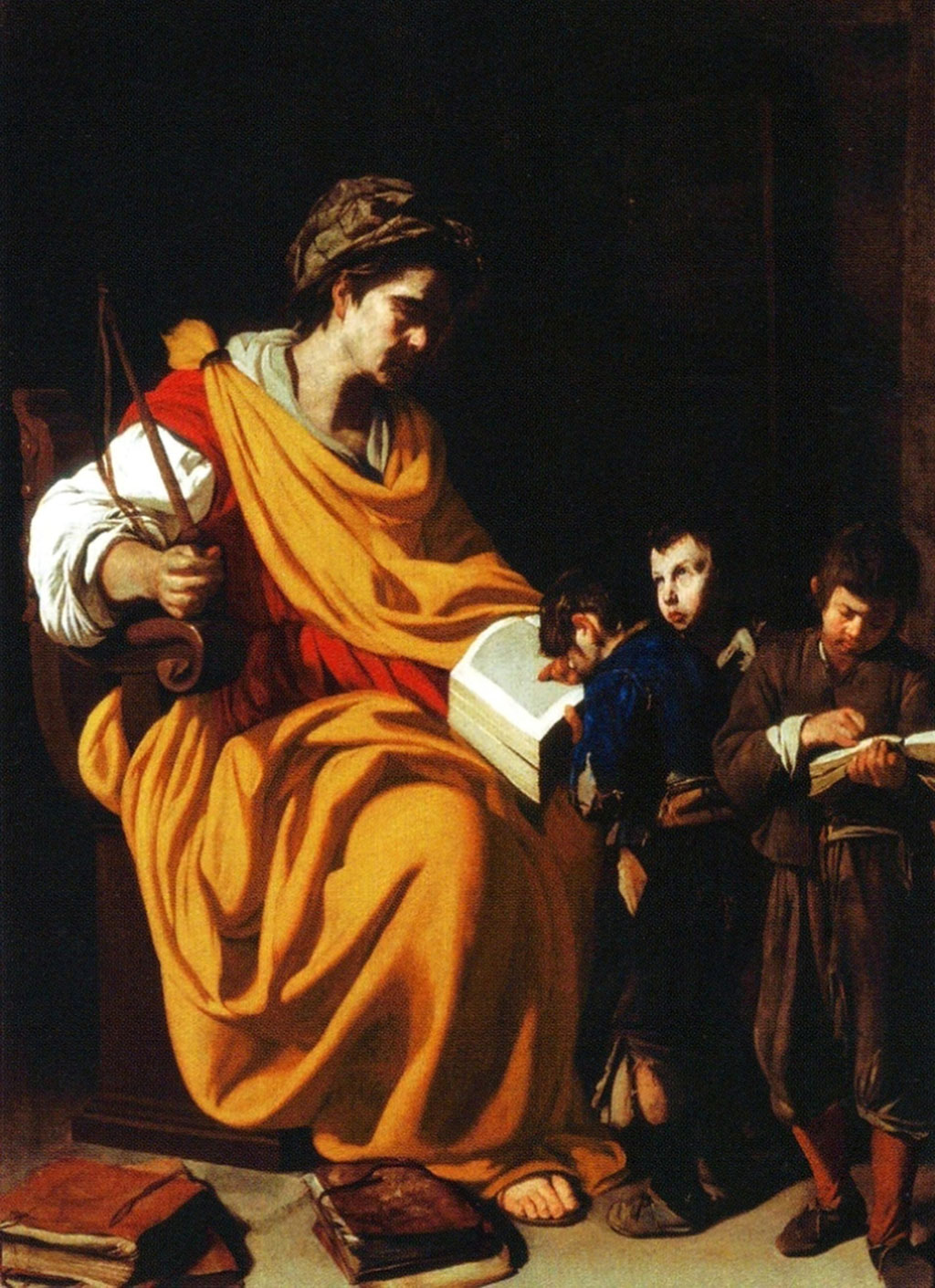
The school teacher, Museo di Capodimonte, Naples

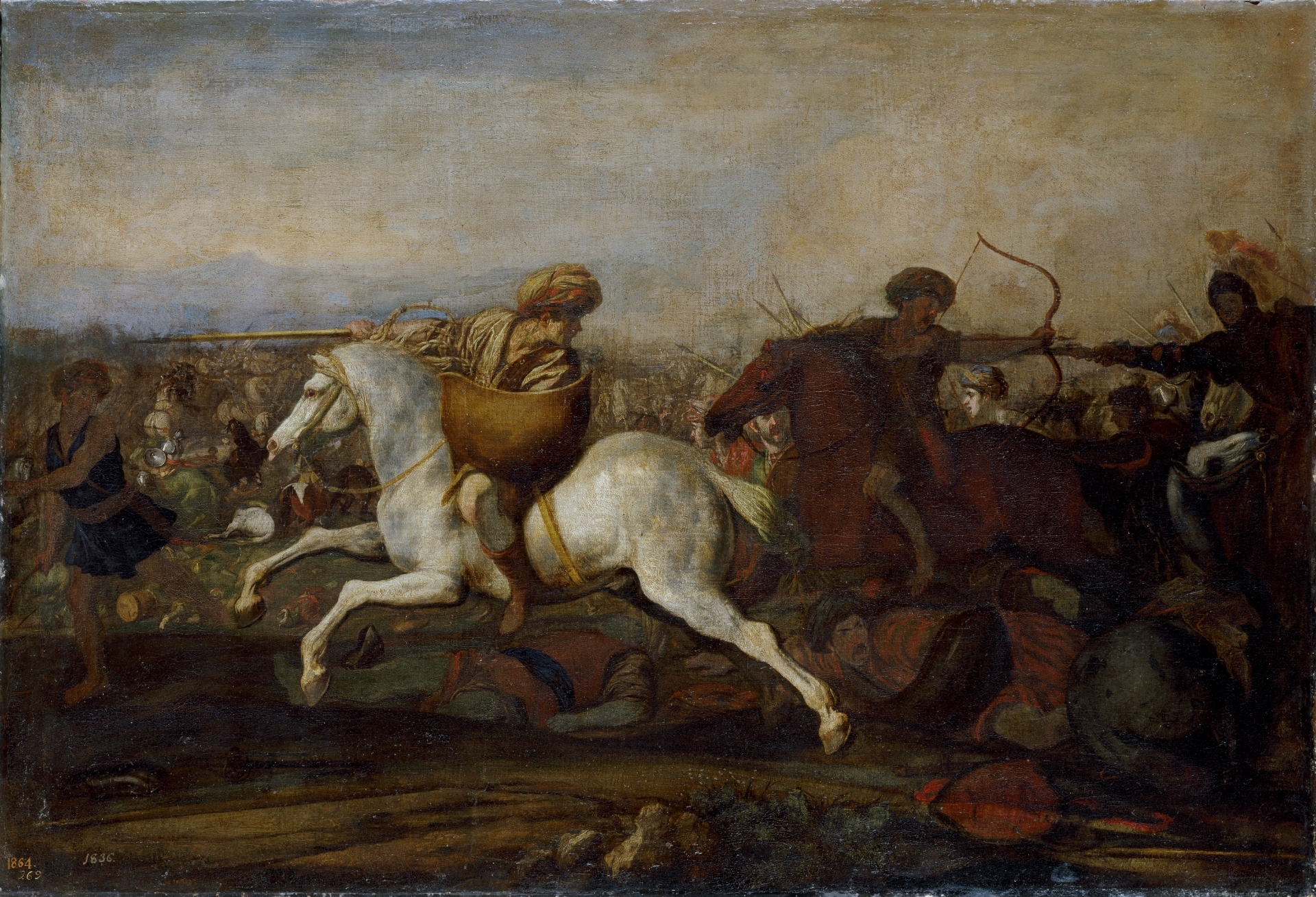
Combat between Turks and Christians, Museo del Prado, Madrid

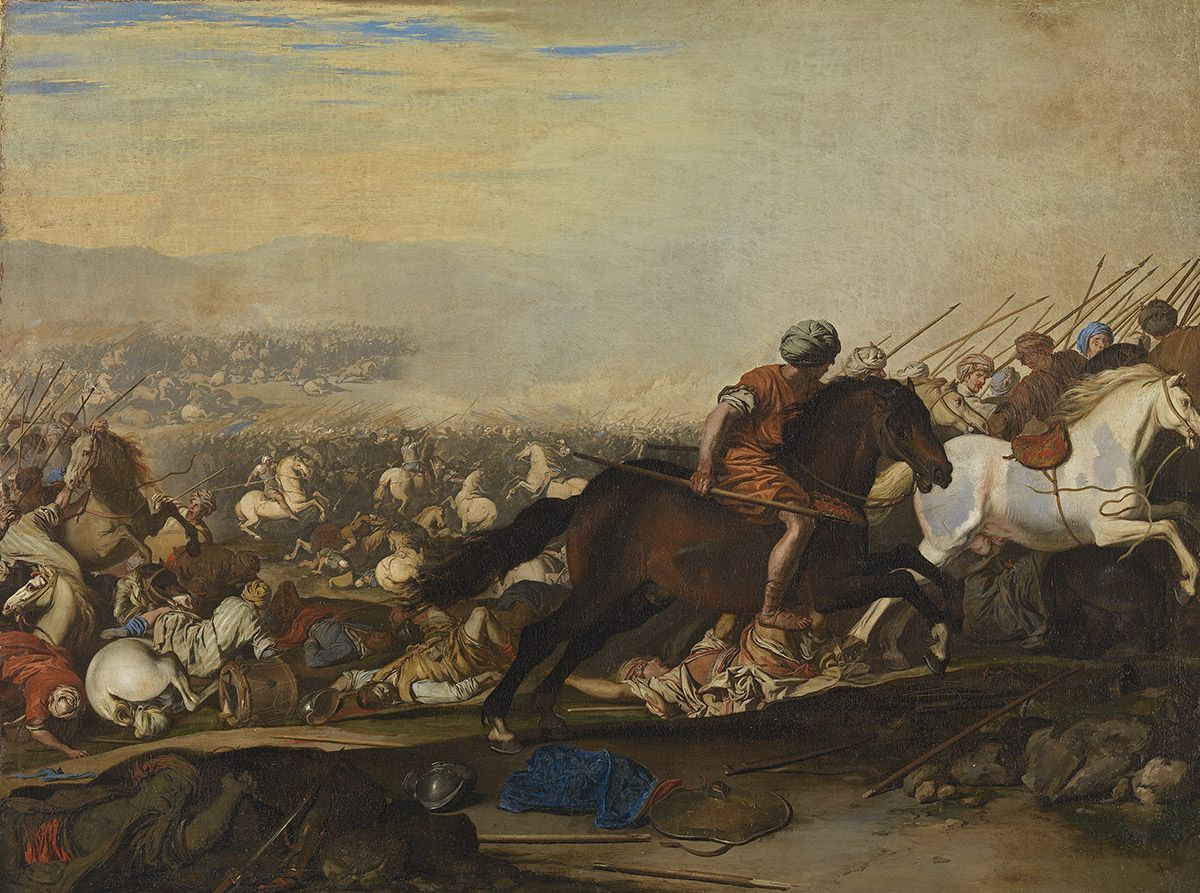
Battle image, Alte Pinakothek, Munich

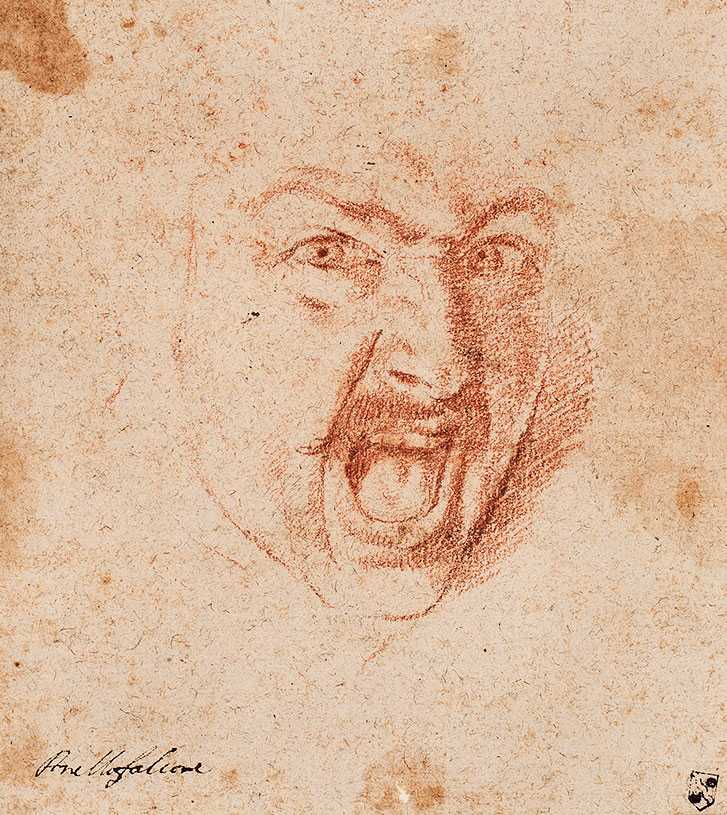
Head of a screaming warrior, drawing, Kunsthalle Bremen

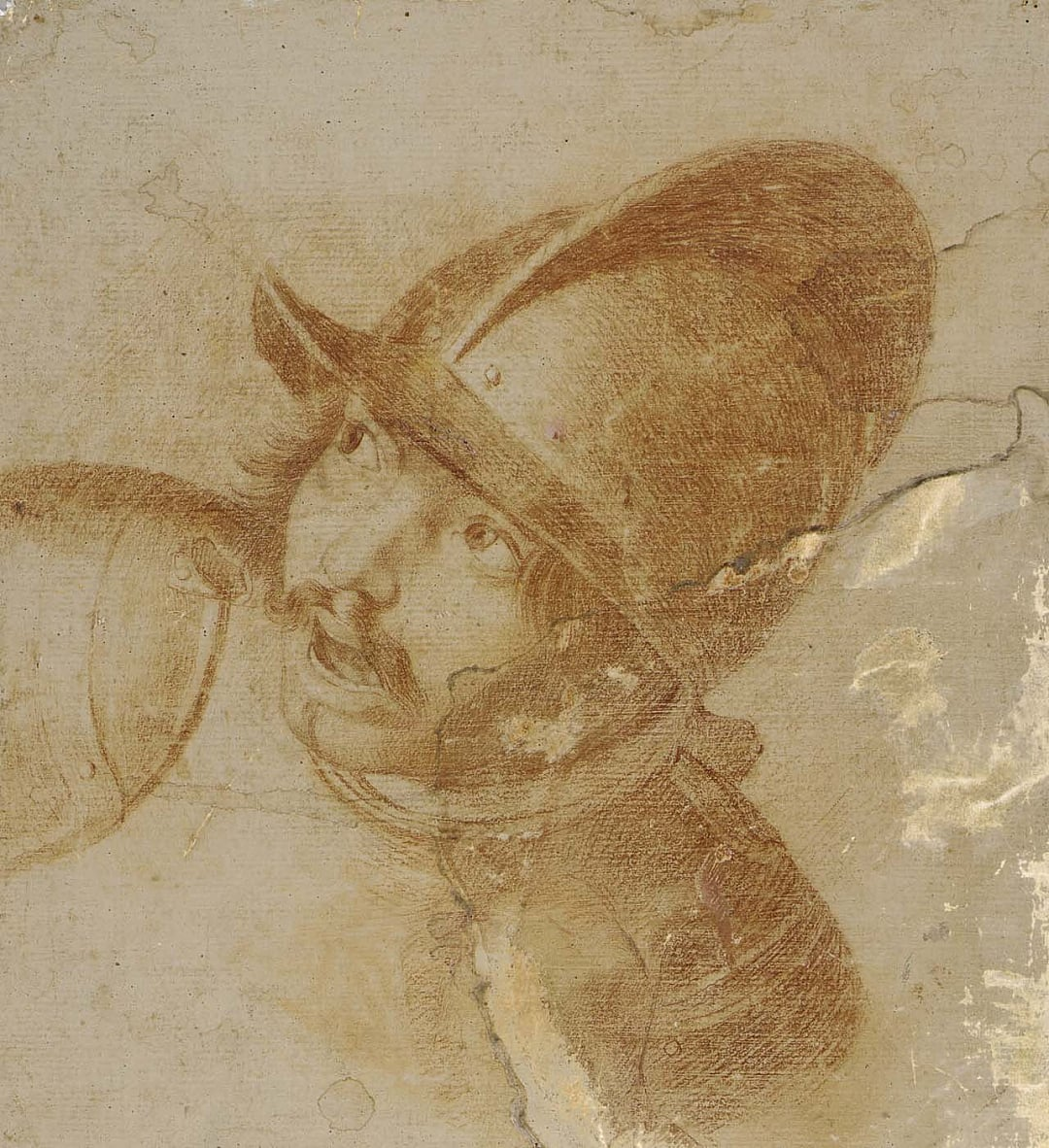
Head of a soldier with a helmet

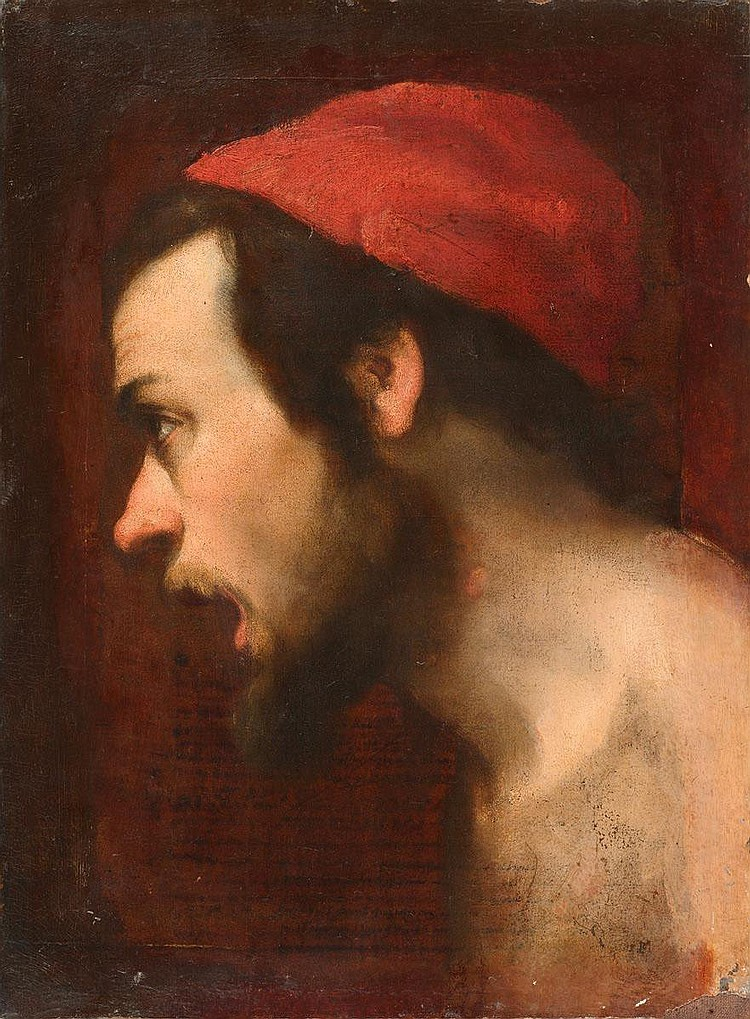
Portrait of Masaniello

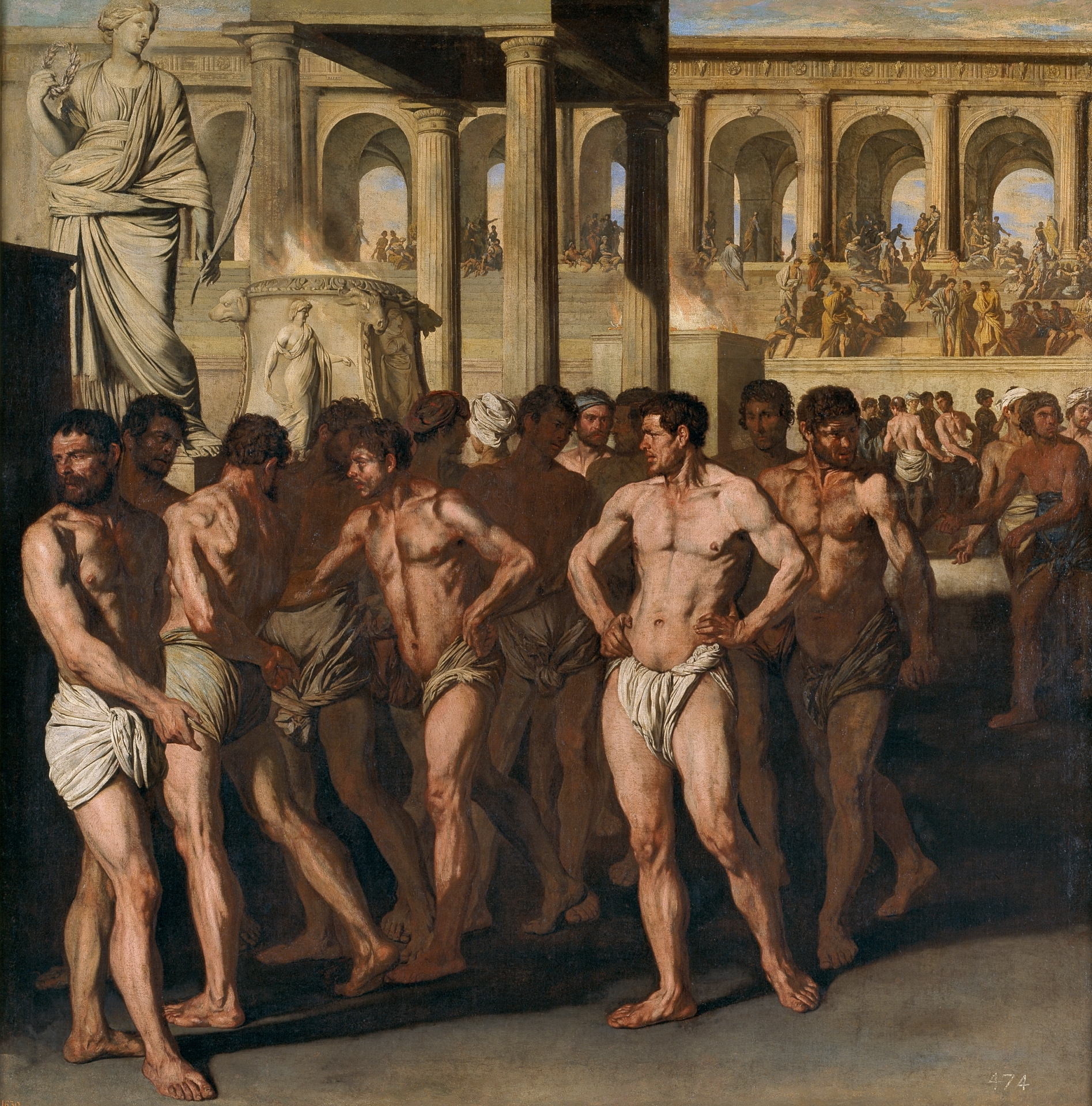
Roman athletes, Museo del Prado, Madrid

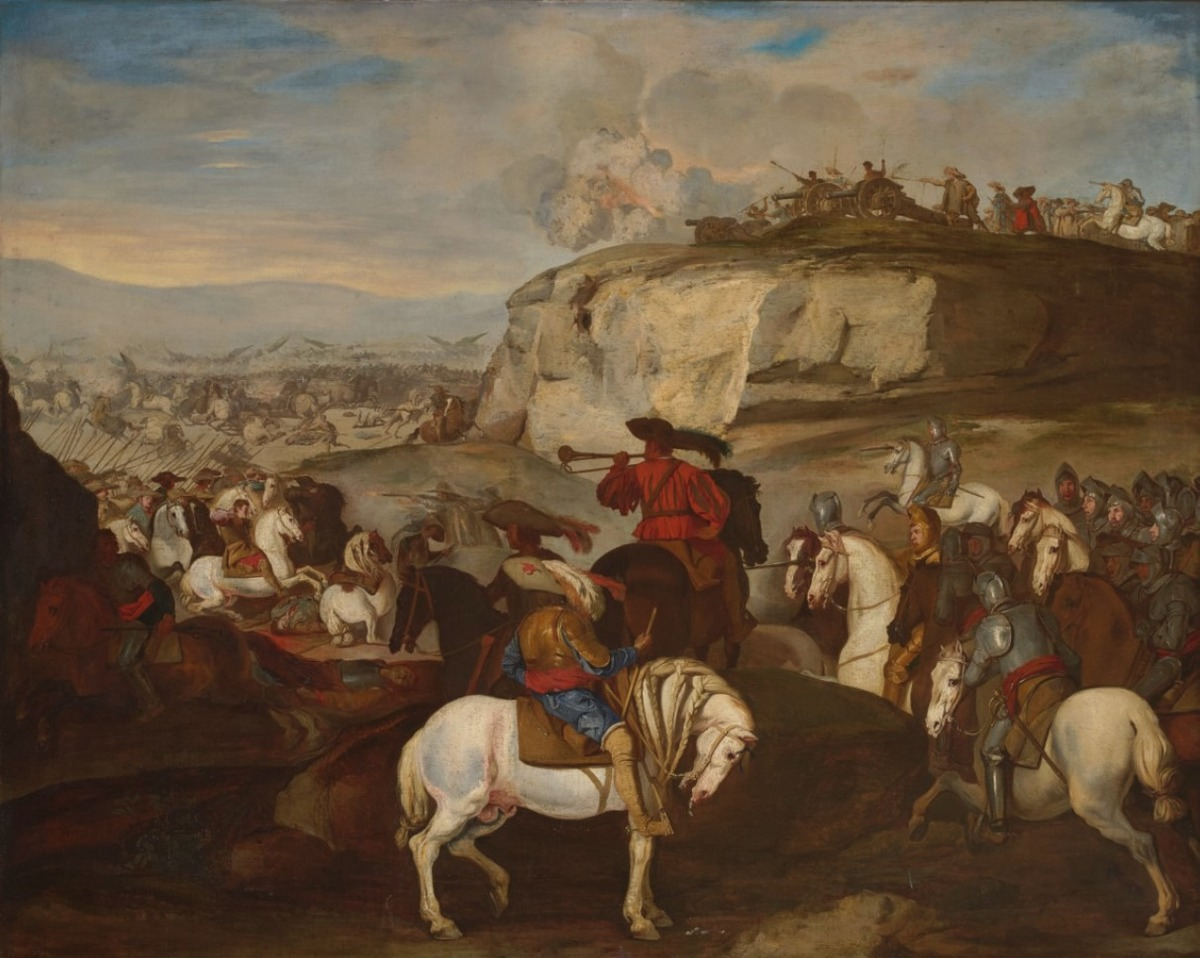
Battle Scene, Government Art Collection, London

== Sources ==
- Painting in Naples: From Caravaggio to Giordano. Exhibition catalogue. London: Royal Academy. 1982.
