= Elena Recco =

Italian still life painter (1654–1715)

- Born: 1654; Naples (Kingdom of Naples)
- Died: 1700s Madrid
- Occupation: Still life Painter
- Father: Giuseppe Recco

Elena Recco (c. 1654 – 1715) was an Italian still-life painter active in the second half of the 17th century.

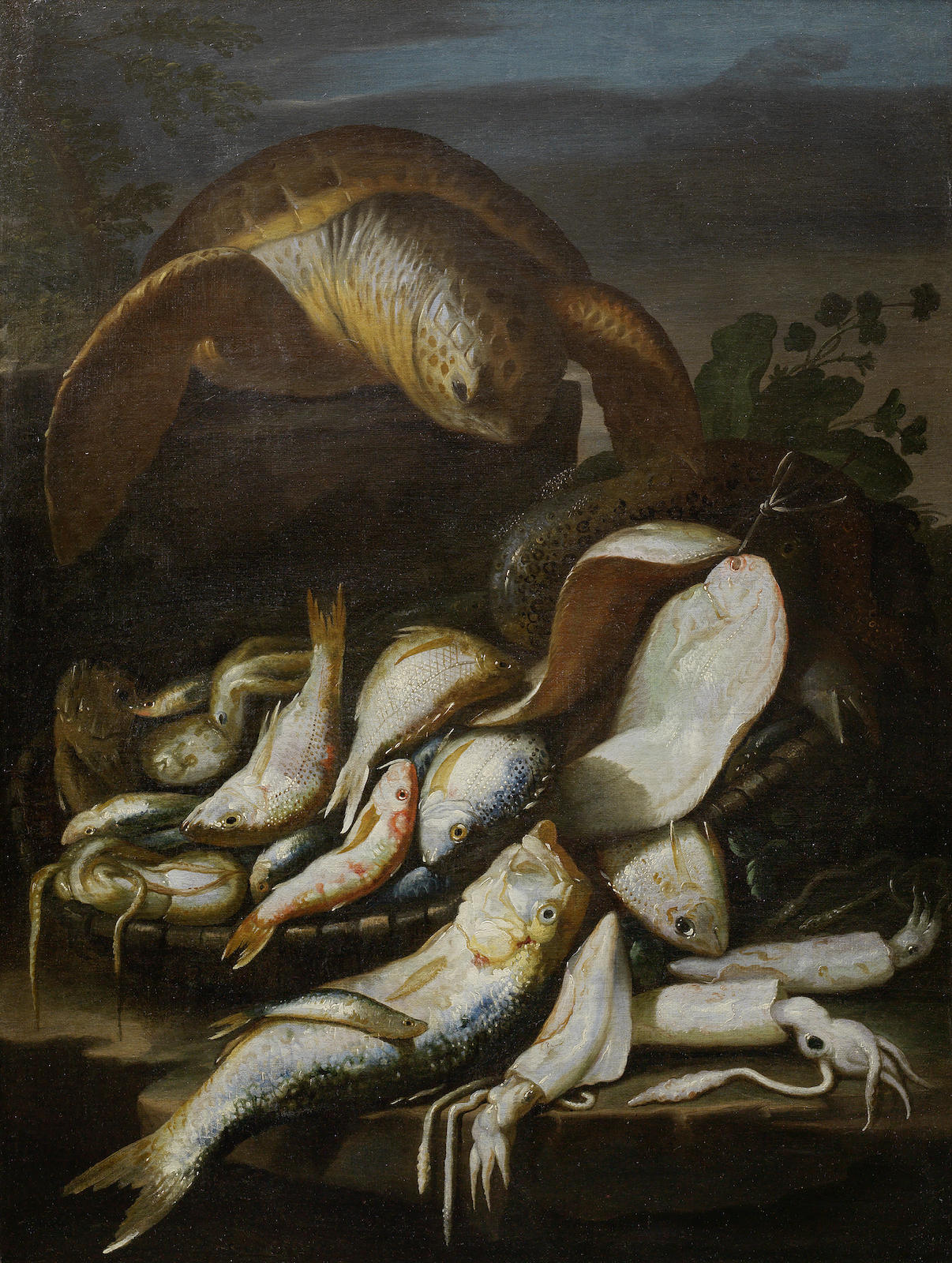
Fruits of the Sea

Born in Naples, she was the daughter of the still-life painter Giuseppe Recco and the sister of Nicola Maria Recco. She accompanied her father to Spain and is mentioned as working at the Spanish court in Madrid after he died in 1695. She is known for still-life paintings of fish.
