= Giuseppe Recco =

Italian painter

Giuseppe Recco (1634 – 29 May 1695) was an Italian painter in the Baroque style. He specialized in a variety of still lifes.

== Career ==
Born in Naples, he likely apprenticed with his family, including his father Giacomo Recco and uncle Giovanni Battista Recco. Later, he perfected his technique with Paolo Porpora, who had been one of his father's students. During a stay in Lombardy, from 1644 to 1654 with his uncle, he was influenced by the works of Evaristo Baschenis.

As his fame spread, he was invited to come to Spain by King Charles II. His assemblies of victuals, both vegetable and animal, were very popular there. His style is often compared to that of Giovan Battista Ruoppolo, who was also a student of Porpora. Early in his career, he went from painting flowers to more varied assemblies and was among the first Italian painters to do so.

Recco may have died at Alicante, Spain, before reaching Madrid, although contemporary sources indicate that he lived there for seven years and became a Knight in the Order of Calatrava.

His children Nicolo and Elena also became painters. In 1989, the art historian, Federico Zeri, raised questions concerning his father's true identity.

== Selected paintings ==
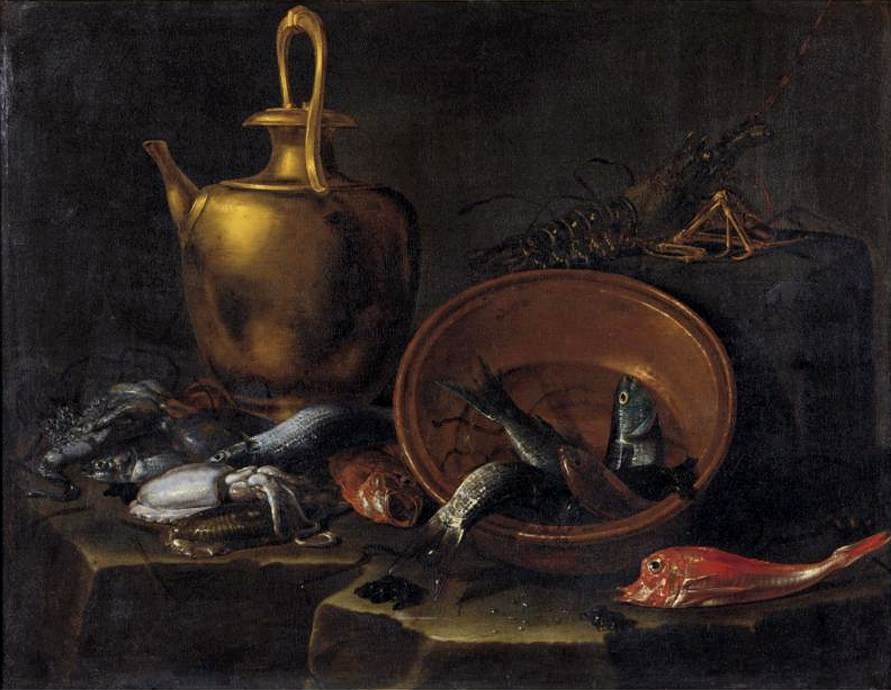
Still-Life with Fish

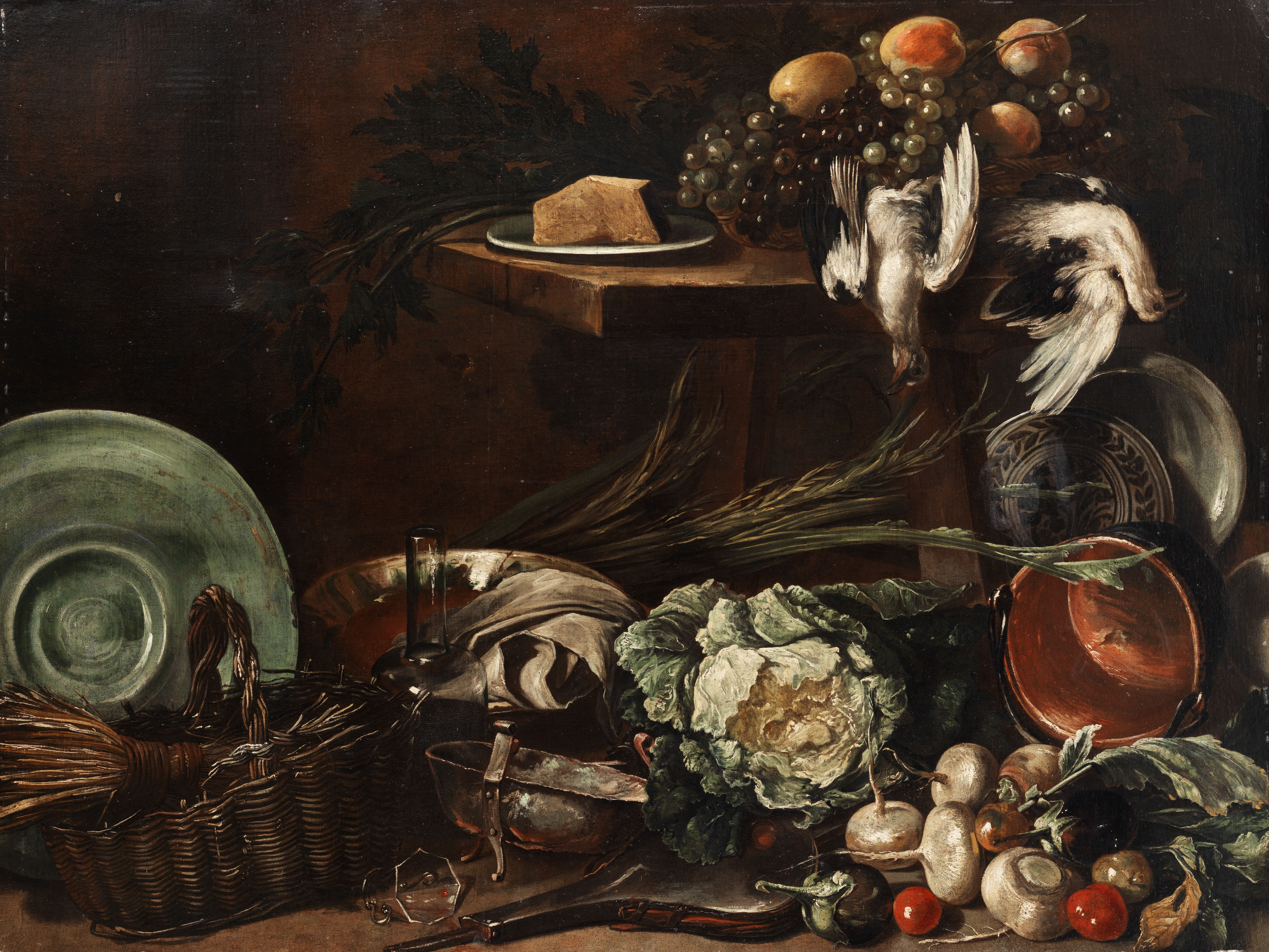
Still-life with Vegetables and Fruits

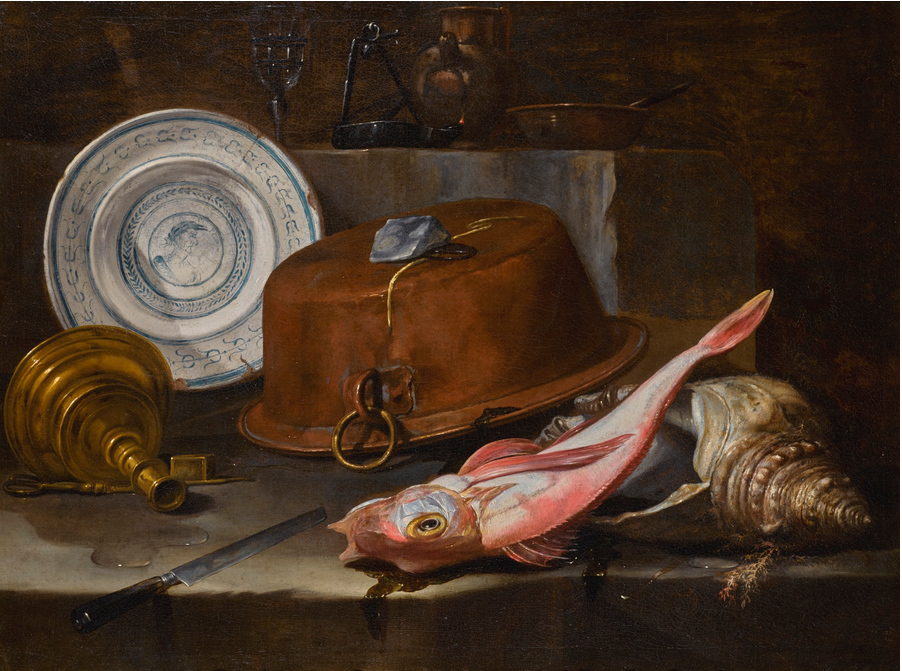
Still-life with Red Gurnard and Shell

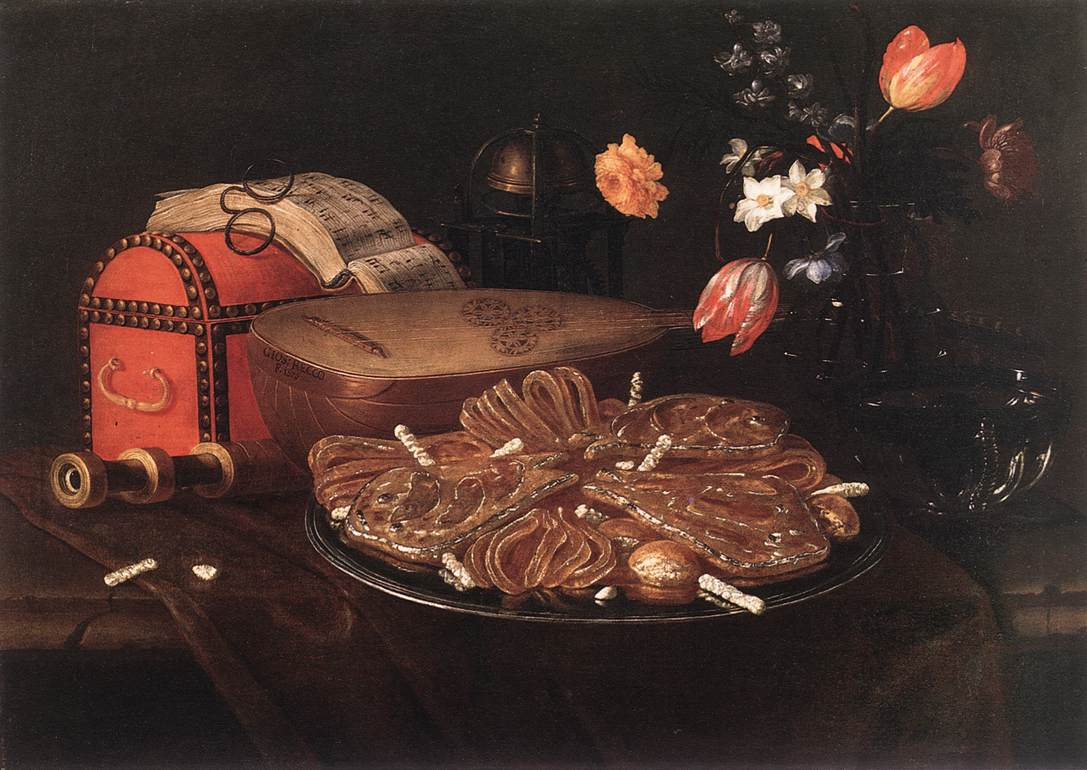
Still-life with the Five Senses

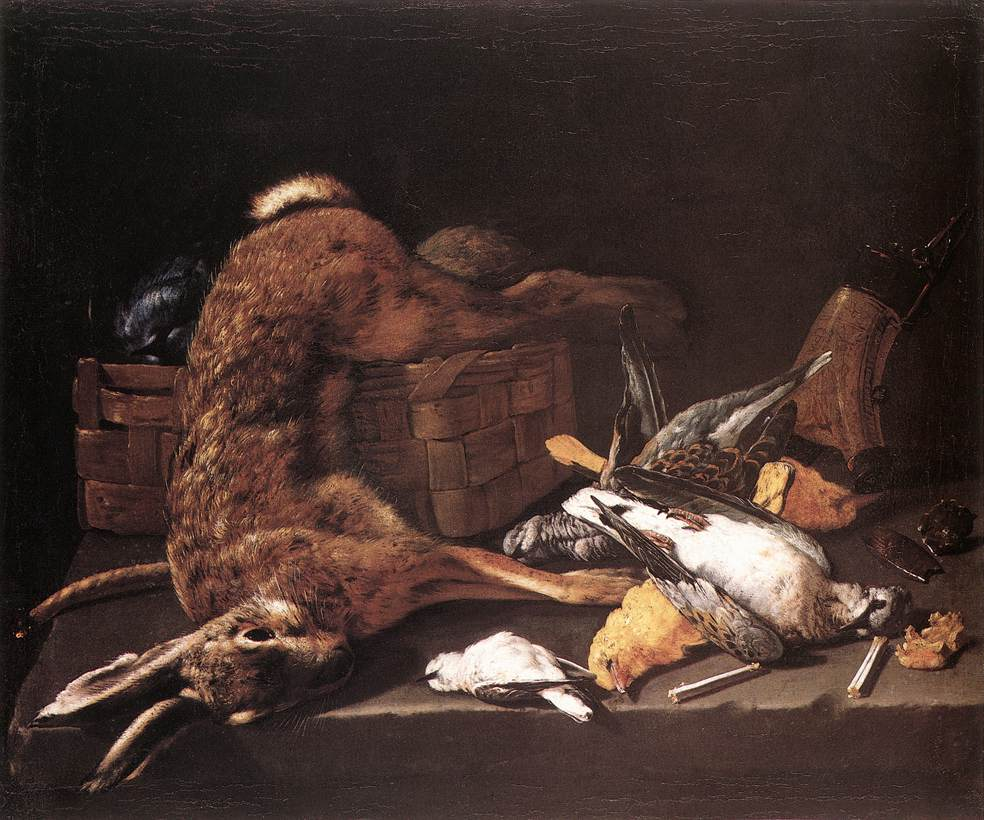
Still-life with Game

== Sources ==
- Boni, Filippo de' (1852). Biografia degli artisti ovvero dizionario della vita e delle opere dei pittori, degli scultori, degli intagliatori, dei tipografi e dei musici di ogni nazione che fiorirono da'tempi più remoti sino á nostri giorni. Seconda Edizione.. Venice; Googlebooks: Presso Andrea Santini e Figlio. p. 844.
