= Gasparo Lopez =

Italian painter

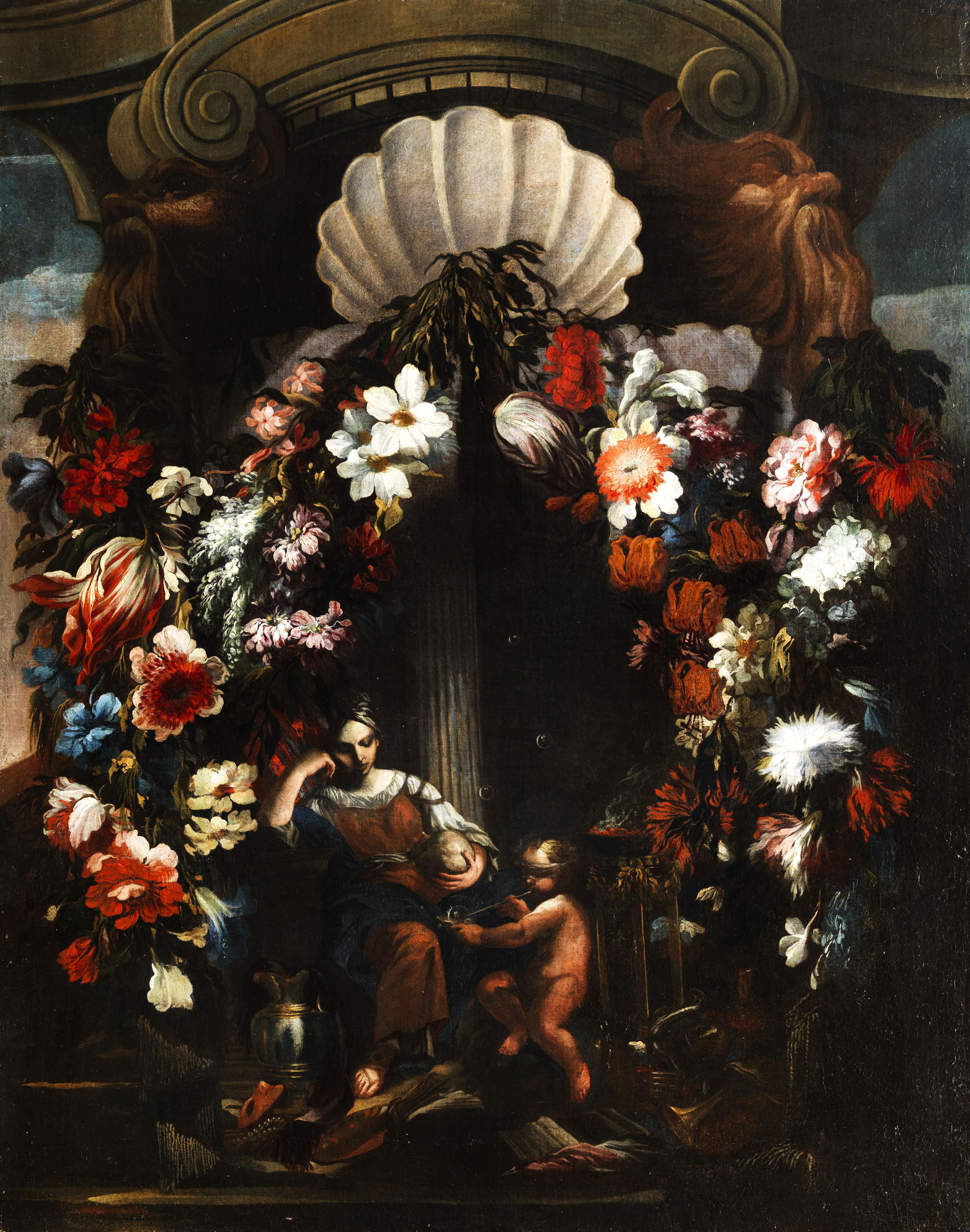
Allegory of the Arts and Sciences (with a Cherub with a blowpipe and bubble) by Gasparo Lopez

Gasparo Lopez (c. 1677–1732) was an Italian painter of the Baroque period.

He was born at Naples and was an excellent painter of flowers, and therefore called Gasparo dei Fiori. He studied under Jean Baptiste Du Buisson, Andrea Belvedere, and worked at Rome, Venice, and Dresden. He settled subsequently at Florence, where he became court painter to the grand-duke. Lopez was murdered there.
