= Paolo Porpora =

Italian painter

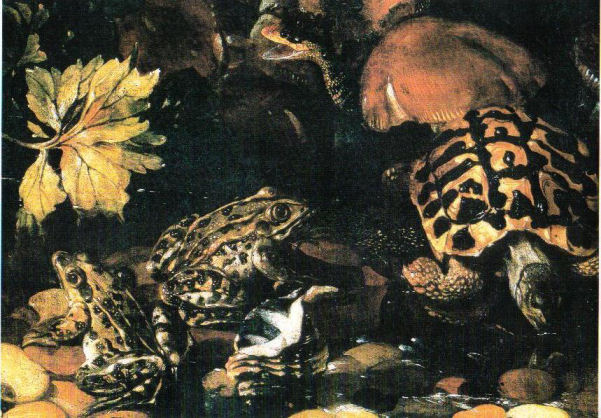
Paolo Porpora, Reptiles, Museo di Capodimonte, Naples

Paolo Porpora (1617–1673) was an Italian painter of the late-Baroque, who was active mainly in Naples and specialized in floral still lifes. He is documented as a pupil of Giacomo Recco, the father of Giuseppe Recco, and said to have worked under Aniello Falcone. He joined the Roman Accademia di San Luca from 1656 to 1658. He appears to have been influenced in Rome by Netherlandish still-life painters. Among his pupils were Giovan Battista Ruoppolo and the Neapolitan Onofrio Loth (died 1717).

== Sources ==
- Web Gallery of Art Biography
