= Epitaph of Adriaen Vryburch =

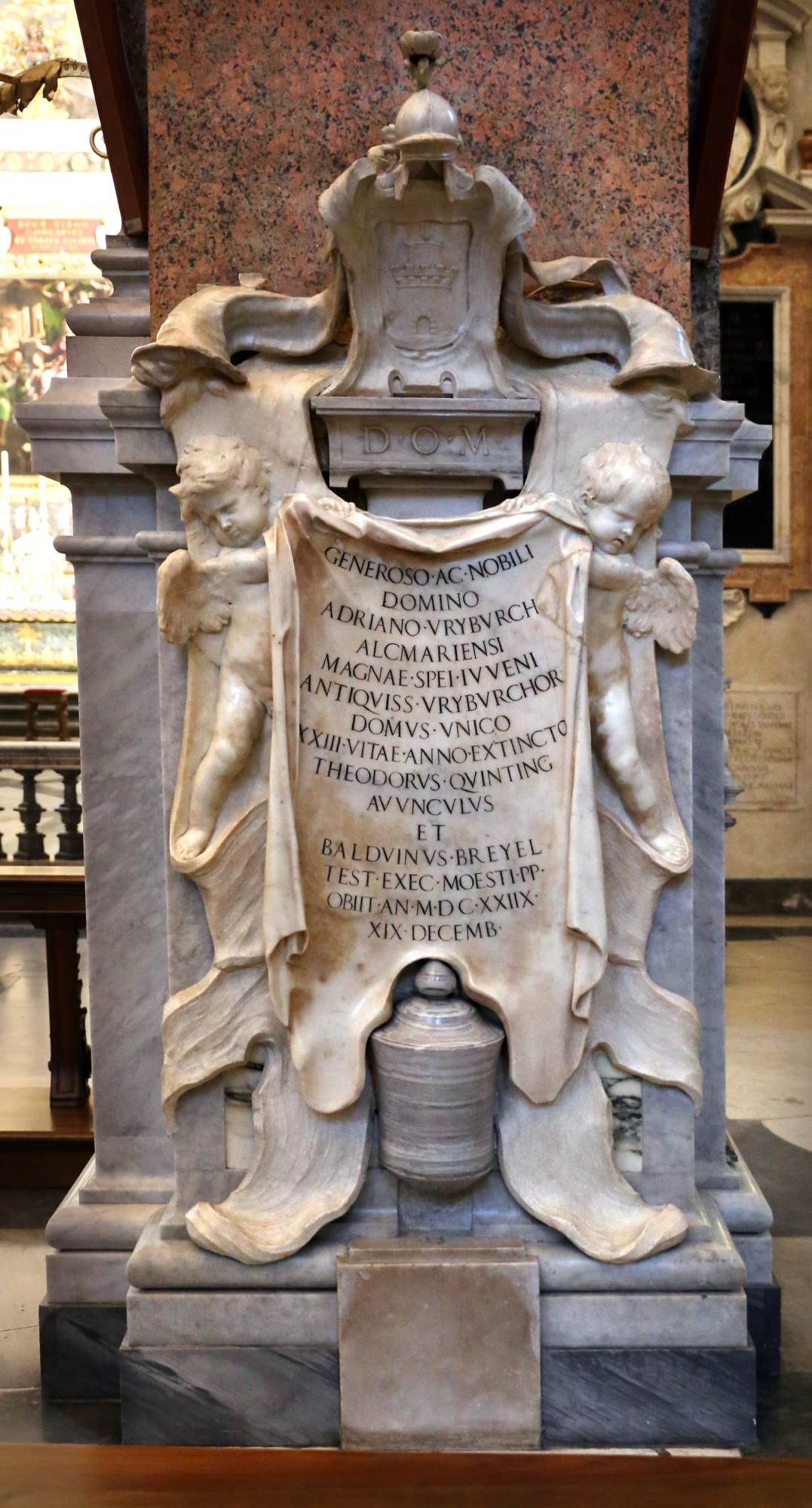
- Artist: François Duquesnoy
- Year: 1629
- Type: Relief
- Medium: Marble
- Location: Santa Maria dell'Anima; Rome; 41°53′59.1″N 12°28′19.3″E

Epitaph of Adriaen Vryburch is a funeral monument completed by the Flemish sculptor François Duquesnoy in the church of Santa Maria dell'Anima in Rome in 1629. The epitaph sits on the pier directly opposite to the epitaph of Ferdinand van den Eynde, which Duquesnoy completed in 1633.

== Subject ==
Vryburch (also spelled Vrijburgh) was a young nobleman from Alkmaar, who, like Ferdinand van den Eynde, was a member of the Netherlandish community of expatriates in Rome. In 1628 he dueled with another Netherlandish nobleman in Rome. On 19 December 1628, he died from injuries he suffered during the duel. He was only 23 at time of death. He was buried in Santa Maria dell'Anima the next day. Vryburch was a Protestant, but his executors managed to get him buried in the church by promising that a beautiful white marble monument would be erected on the tomb. Duquesnoy and Vryburch knew each other, as Duquesnoy had carved a portrait of him a few years before Vryburch's death.

== Sculpture ==
The administration of Santa Maria dell'Anima granted permission for the installation of the epitaph on the pier above Vryburch's grave in October 1629. Vryburch's uncle, Theodore Quinting, and the executor of his will Baldoin Breyel (an Antwerp born merchant and a leading member of the Flemish community in Rome) arranged for the commission of Vryburch's epitaph.

In the epitaph, two putti, casting mournful glances left and right, are raising a cloth with an inscription to Vryburch. They perch onto an animal hide hung around a coat of arms behind them. There are a ram's horns circling the coat of arms, which emerge from the holed hide and recall the theme of Isaac. The epitaph is completed by an urn at the monument's base. For this monument, Duquesnoy innovatively abandoned architectural frameworking, supplying just a cornice to support the coat of arms, and applying it onto an existing pier.

The epitaph was inspired by Duquesnoy's study of Roman sarcophagi and cippi. Vryburch's putti look like mature children as they generally do on the Roman cippi and sarcophagi. The putti in the Vryburch epitaph were a step in Duquesnoy's development of the winged infants to the "peak of [the putto's] evolution," represented in the putti in the epitaph of Ferdinand van den Eynde. With its putti raising a cloth to the passerby viewer, the monument figures the "displacement of the untimely death away from one's homeland." The monument presents itself as a makeshift, roadside memorial. The employment of existing architecture further highlights this apparent marker's ephemerality.
