= Johan Sylvius =

Swedish painter

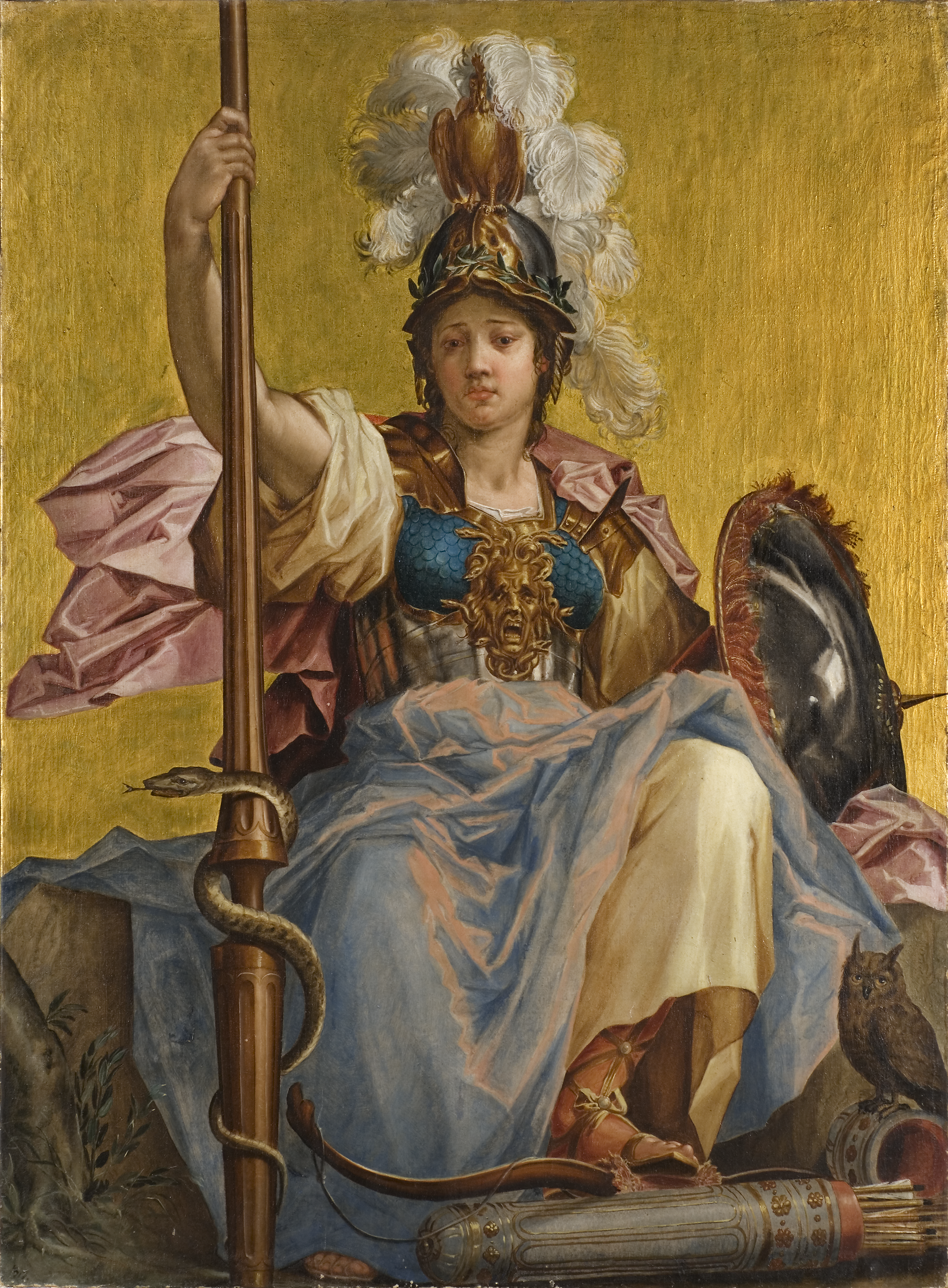
Minerva, Oil painting by Johan Sylvius, National Museum, Stockholm

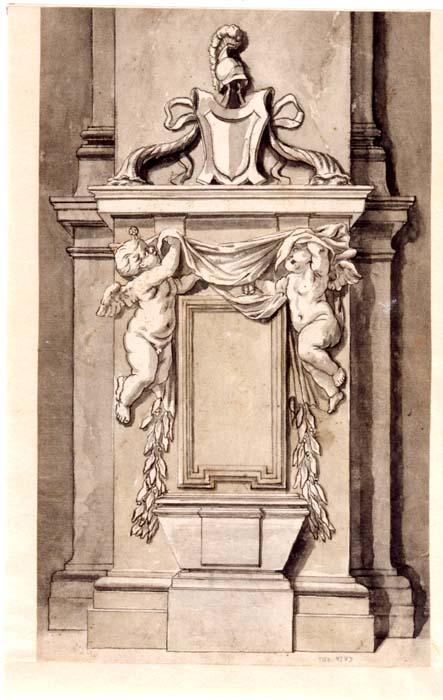
Gravmonument över Ferdinand van den Eynde by Johan Sylvius, after Duquesnoy's original, National Museum, Stockholm

Johan Sylvius (probably 1620 – March 1695) was a Swedish painter.

== Early life ==
He was probably born in Sweden, and possibly died at Drottningholm Palace, in Lovön parish, Stockholm county. Sylvius spent much of his youth and manhood abroad; however, little is known about his early life. He may have been of German origin, and he worked for some years (1658–85) in Rome.

== Painting career ==
During his time spent in Rome, he had the opportunity to study Peter Paul Rubens and other Netherlandish masters. Thirty-five pen-and-wash drawings survive from his time spent in Italy. These were originally the property of his colleague, Nicodemus Tessin.

Sylvius travelled to England in the 1670s, wherein he assisted Antonio Verrio with the decoration of Windsor Castle. En route to England, he possibly stepped in Paris, where he might have studied Charles Le Brun. During his stay in England, he was praised by Peter Lely for his skill as a portrait painter. His most notable surviving works are the vast allegorical and mythological paintings (dating from 1685 to 1695) wherewith he decorated Drottningholm Castle. He also decorated Slottskyrkan in Stockholm in the same period.

In the National Museum in Stockholm, there exist a number of studies of his works. In Rome, Sylvius painted an oil painting of unknown date depicting Minerva, the Roman goddess of wisdom and strategic warfare. This oil painting measures 164 cm x 122 cm. In Rome, Johan Sylvius also drew a pen and wash drawing on paper in gray and black, executed with pencil and brown ink, called Gravmonument över Ferdinand van den Eynde, or 'Tomb monument over Ferdinand van den Eynde,' after François Duquesnoy's original in the church of Santa Maria dell'Anima in Rome. The latter drawing measures 38.2 x 23 cm.

== Sources ==
- Svenskt konstnärslexikon del V, sid 360–361, Allhems Förlag, Malmö.
