= Die Deutschen Inschriften =

German Organization

Die Deutschen Inschriften des Mittelalters und der Frühen Neuzeit (DI) (engl.: The German Inscriptions of Medieval and Early Modern Times) is one of the oldest modern endeavours to collect and redact medieval and early modern inscriptions in Europe. The project was instituted by the German linguist Friedrich Panzer (Heidelberg) in association with the historians Karl Brandi (Göttingen) and Hans Hirsch (Vienna) as an interacademic venture of epigraphical publication in 1934. Encompassed are inscriptions ranging from the Early Middle Ages to the year of 1650 (and later on) localized in the areas that are today known as the Federal Republic of Germany, the Republic of Austria and South Tyrol. By now the epigraphical research centers involved have published 81 volumes. An individual volume contains usually the inscriptions of a single city or Landkreis respectively called Politischer Bezirk in Austria. The venture is supported by the German Academies of Sciences in Berlin, Düsseldorf, Göttingen, Heidelberg, Leipzig, Mainz and München as well as the Austrian Academy of Sciences in Vienna. The Reichert-Verlag is the publishing house of the scientific editions.

== Deutsche Inschriften Online (DIO) ==
The project "Deutsche Inschriften Online" (engl.: German Inscriptions Online) was planned and implemented as an interacademic venture by the Academies of Sciences in Mainz and Göttingen. The project's aim was to digitise the volumes DI 66/45/56/58/61 and make them available online. The realisation is based on a database which was developed by the Inscription-offices in Greifswald and Mainz. The venture has an innovative character. It is a broadening of the project "Inschriften Mittelrhein-Hunsrück (IMH)" (engl.: Inscriptions of the Middlerhine-Hunsrück) conducted in 2008 in cooperation with the "Institut für Geschichtliche Landeskunde an der Universität Mainz" (engl.: Institute for Regional History located at the University of Mainz). The project digitised the volume "Die Inschriften des Rhein-Hunsrück Kreises I (DI 60)" (engl.: The Inscriptions of the Rhine-Hunsrück District) edited by epigraphist Eberhard J. Nikitsch. In the meantime the website of the IMH-Project has merged into the DIO-Web portal. There is a long term plan for digitising and making available online further volumes; and well as providing an English translation of the DIO-Website.

Besides the digitized scientific volumes DIO features; an advanced search interface; information concerning epigraphy; a number of regular series, on topics such as "Epigraphischer Tipp" (engl.: Epigraphical Hint) and "Inschrift im Fokus" (engl.: Focused on Inscription); a glossary; and a list of topical weblinks. In addition the site presents a wide range of photographic images and illustrations of inscriptions or similar objects as a means of interlinking all possible information.

Currently (January 2020) there are 47 volumes available on the database. These are the following volumes:

- DI-19 Göttingen
- DI-24 St. Michaeliskloster in Lüneburg and the monastery Lüne until 1550
- DI-25 Landkreis Ludwigsburg
- DI-26 Osnabrück
- DI-28 Hameln
- DI-29 Worms
- DI-30 Landkreis Calw
- DI-31 Aachen Cathedral
- DI-32 Aachen
- DI-34 Landkreis Bad Kreuznach
- DI-35 Braunschweig until 1528
- DI-36 Hannover
- DI-37 Rems-Murr-Kreis
- DI-38 Landkreis Bergstraße
- DI-41 Landkreis Göppingen
- DI-42 Einbeck
- DI-45 Goslar
- DI-46 Minden
- DI-49 Darmstadt and the Landkreis Darmstadt-Dieburg and Landkreis Groß-Gerau
- DI-50 Bonn
- DI-51 Wiesbaden
- DI-56 Braunschweig from 1529 to 1671
- DI-58 Hildesheim
- DI-59 Lemgo
- DI-60 Rhein-Hunsrück-Kreis I (Boppard, Oberwesel, St. Goar)
- DI-61 Helmstedt
- DI-62 Landkreis Weißenfels
- DI-63 Odenwaldkreis
- DI-64 former Landkreis Querfurt
- DI-66 Landkreis Göttingen
- DI-67 Passau up to the town fire of 1662
- DI-69 Freising
- DI-74 Regensburg II. St. Peter's cathedral 1 (up to 1500)
- DI-75 Halberstadt Cathedral
- DI-76 The Lüneburgian monasteries Ebstorf, Isenhagen, Lüne, Medingen, Walsrode, Wienhausen
- DI-77 Greifswald
- DI-78 Baden-Baden and Landkreis Rastatt
- DI-79 Rhein-Hunsrück-Kreis II (former Landkreis Simmern and western part of the former Landkreis St. Goar)
- DI-80 Landkreis Passau I. The former districts of Passau and Wegscheid
- DI-81 Essen
- DI-83 Landkreis Holzminden
- DI-84 Landkreis Weilheim-Schongau up to 1650
- DI-85 Halle an der Saale
- DI-86 Halberstadt
- DI-88 Landkreis Hildesheim
- DI-89 Düsseldorf
- DI-95 Regensburg. St. Peter's Cathedral 2 (from 1501 to 1700)
- DI-96 Landkreis Northeim
- DI-99 Ingolstadt

In addition, there are six online catalogues, which are either only available in digital form or have not been published in print within the edition series "Die Deutschen Inschriften".

- DIO-1 The Inscriptions of the City of Mainz. First Part: The Inscriptions of the Cathedral and the Museum of Cathedral and Diocese ranging from 800 to 1350
- DIO-2 Gandersheim Abbey and her own monasteries Brunshausen and Clus
- DIO-3 Santa Maria dell'Anima in Rome
- DIO-4 Mariental monastery
- DIO-5 Nail-Chapel of the Bamberg Cathedral
- DIO-6 Textile inscriptions of the city of Bamberg

The Heidelberg Academy of Sciences has made another five volumes available online as digital copies.

- DI-4 Wimpfen am Neckar
- DI-5 City of Munich and Landkreis Munich
- DI-13 Cemeteries of St. John's, St. Rochus and Wöhrd in Nuremberg
- DI-15 Rothenburg ob der Tauber
- DI-17 Landkreis Haßberge

=== Other collaborative projects ===
The team responsible for the DIO archive has also launched the online publication of a database of inscriptions in the “German national church” Santa Maria dell’Anima in Rome. This database contains inscriptions dating from mediaeval times to 1559; it was published in collaboration with the German Historical Institute in Rome. Another interdisciplinary project closely related to DIO is St. Stephen virtual, a project run jointly by several institutes and academic departments in Mainz. Its goal was to make information from the database accessible to the general public by simulating a "virtual visit" of the interior cloister of St. Stephen's Church, Mainz.

The aim of the project Referenzkorpus historischer Texte des Deutschen (Engl. linguistic corpus of German language texts) is to annotate the grammatical structure of texts. It is planned to make the annotated texts available online within the Referenzkorpus Deutsche Inschriften (Engl. linguistic corpus of German inscriptions), with an estimated 400,000 annotated word forms.

== See also ==
- Digital humanities

== Bibliography ==
=== German Inscriptions (DI) ===
- Karl Brandi: Grundlegung einer deutschen Inschriftenkunde (Engl. foundation of a lore of German epigraphy). In: Deutsches Archiv für Erforschung des Mittelalters Bd. 1 (1937) S. 11-43.
- Ernst Cucuel: Das deutsche Inschriftenwerk der vereinigten Akademien, seine Aufgaben, Ziele und Methoden (Eng. the German epigraphical opus of the united Academies of Sciences, its tasks, goals and method). In: Blätter für deutsche Landesgeschichte Bd. 85 (1939) S. 116-134.
- Deutsche Inschriften. Terminologie zur Schriftbeschreibung (Engl. German inscriptions. Terminology for the description of epigraphical scriptures). Erarb. von den Mitarb. der Inschriftenkommission der Akademien der Wissenschaften in Berlin. Wiesbaden 1999.
- Rudolf Maria Kloos: Die deutschen Inschriften (Engl. the German inscriptions). In: Deutsches Archiv für Erforschung des Mittelalters Bd. 15 (1959) S. 177–181.
- Rudolf Maria Kloos: Die Deutschen Inschriften. Ein Bericht über das deutsche Inschriftenunternehmen (Engl. the German inscriptions. Memorandum on the German epigraphical enterprise). In: Studi medievali Ser. 3, Bd. 14 (1973) S. 335-362.
- Eberhard J. Nikitsch: Fritz V. Arens als Mainzer Inschriftensammler und Epigraphiker (Engl. Fritz V. Arens as collector of inscriptions in Mainz and epigraph). In: Mainzer Zeitschrift Bd. 103 (2008) S. 231-243.
- Friedrich Panzer: Die Inschriften des deutschen Mittelalters. Ein Aufruf zu ihrer Sammlung und Bearbeitung (Engl. Inscriptions of the German Middle Ages. Appeal for collecting and editing). Im Auftrage der Akademien der Wissenschaften von Berlin, Göttingen, Heidelberg, Leipzig, München und Wien verfasst. Leipzig 1938.

=== German Inscriptions Online (DIO) ===
- Paul Sebastian Moos/Eberhard J. Nikitsch: Blick in die Historikerwerkstatt: Die Arbeitswelt des Epigraphikers. Historische Hilfswissenschaft und ihre Bedeutung für Geschichte und Wissenschaft – ein römischer Erfahrungsbericht (=A Glance into the Historian’s Workshop: The Working World of the Epigrapher. The Historical Auxiliary Sciences and Their Significance for Historical and Academic Studies – a Roman Experience Report) (URN: urn:nbn:de:0289-2012050312) In: Skriptum 2 (2012), Nr. 1. (The historians outline their work, describe the various steps editioning the epigraphical corpus of the Santa Maria dell’Anima, and locate their auxiliary science within modern historical and cultural studies. It also provides the reader with an informative overview of the working environment of an epigrapher at the German Historical Institute in Rome.) (in German)
- Anna Neovesky: St. Stephan virtuell – ein internetgestützter Panoramarundgang durch die Mainzer Stephanskirche – Entwicklung und Umsetzung eines Projektes im Bereich der digitalen Geisteswissenschaften. (= St. Stephen virtual – digital walkabout around the interiour cloister of St. Stephen’s Church – genesis and implementation of a Digital Humanities project) (URN: urn:nbn:de:0289-2012110220) In: Skriptum 2 (2012), Nr. 2. ( The essay describes the planning and technical realization of an interdisciplinary project of the Digital Humanities, using the example of “St. Stephan virtual”. This project was accomplished with the cooperation of the „Deutsche Inschriften“ and the Digital Academy of the ADWL Mainz, the Institute for Regional History and Culture at the University Mainz and the i3mainz – the Institute for Spatial Information and Surveying Technology at the University of Applied Sciences Mainz.) (in German)
- Schrade, Torsten: Epigraphik im digitalen Umfeld (=Epigraphy in the Digital Field). (URN: urn:nbn:de:0289-2011051816). In: Skriptum 1 (2011), Nr. 1. ISSN 2192-4457. (Article available under Creative Commons-Licence; the article overviews genesis and development of DIO) (in German)
- Torsten Schrade: Vom Inschriftenband zum Datenobjekt. Die Entwicklung des epigraphischen Fachportals „Deutsche Inschriften Online.“ (=From scholarly edition to data object. The evolution of the scholarly web portal “German Inscriptions Online”). In: Inschriften als Zeugnisse kulturellen Gedächtnisses – 40 Jahre Deutsche Inschriften in Göttingen. Beiträge zum Jubiläumskolloquium vom 22. Oktober 2010 in Göttingen, herausgegeben von Nikolaus Henkel. Reichert Verlag, Wiesbaden 2012, S. 59–72.
