= Pontifical Teutonic Institute Santa Maria dell' Anima =

The Pontifical Teutonic Institute Santa Maria dell' Anima is located in the vicinity of Piazza Navona. Associated with the likewise named church, It became the German national and religious centre in Rome. It is a residential college for priests who study at one of the Pontifical Athenaeums for advanced studies or work in the Roman Curia. The current rector is Michael Max who stems from the archdiocese of Salzburg.

== Background ==
S. Maria dell' Anima, the German national church and hospice in Rome, received its name, according to tradition, from the picture of Our Lady which forms its coat of arms (the Blessed Virgin between two souls). It was founded as early as 1350, as a hospice for German pilgrims on the occasion of the Jubilee of 1350. It was erected on its present site in 1386, when Johannes (Jan) Peters of Dodrecht, officer of the Papal Guard, and his wife Katharina bought three houses and turned them into a private hospice for pilgrims.

== History ==
A confraternity in aid of the suffering souls in purgatory was soon after formed. Dietrich of Nieheim was an energetic promoter of the new foundation, and the 1913 Catholic Encyclopedia considers him the chief founder aside from Peters. In 1431 a church was built on the place of the hospice's chapel and the community was united with the German hospice of St. Andrew which had been founded in 1372 by the priest Nicholas of Kulm. Prominent citizens of the Holy Roman Empire residing in Rome became members of the Confraternity of Santa Maria dell'Anima, including William of Orange's eldest son, Philip William. It became during the fifteenth and sixteenth centuries the German national and religious centre in Rome. It remained a stronghold of German influence and a refuge to all Germans in need.

=== College ===
The college of priests, dates back to the year 1496, and was founded by Johann Burchard of Strasburg, the Master of Papal Ceremonies, and provost of the Confraternity of Santa Maria dell'Anima. It was while he held the office of Praefectus fabricae that the decision was taken to rebuild the church of Santa Maria dell'Anima as part of the celebration of the Jubilee of 1500. The decision was taken at a meeting of the Brotherhood on 24 and 25 September 1499; the rebuilding took nearly two decades.

As early as the sixteenth century the college consisted of fourteen chaplains. In 1699, Leopold I announced that Santa Maria dell'Anima would be placed under his personal protection. This made it more of a Habsburg institution than strictly German. Despite its long used names "German national church" and "German national institute", priests who lived in the college and offer spiritual support in the parish stemmed from different European countries throughout the Holy Roman Empire, e.g. Luxemburg, Slovenia, and the Czech Republic.

For over many centuries the institution was responsible for expatriots, pilgrims and priests from the Holy Roman Empire. It served as intermediary for Austrian and German dioceses in their relations with the Curia, and serves as a home for German-speaking priests, and as the stopping place of German bishops and priests from Austria, Germany, and America.

The college was destroyed during the French Revolution, but restored in 1853 by Emperor Francis Joseph I. In 1859 a college of chaplains to officiate in the church was established; the chaplains were to remain only two or at the most three years, and at the same time were to continue their studies. They devoted themselves chiefly to canon law with a view to employing their knowledge in the service of their respective dioceses; and they receive living and tuition gratis. The two years' residence in the college afforded special opportunities for the study of canon law in theory at the Papal universities, and in practice under the higher church officials. Other priests also were admitted who come to Rome at their own expense for the purpose of study. The college continued to assist poor Germans who come to Rome, either to visit the holy places or in search of employment.

Archbishop of Munich and cardinal Michael Faulhaber, cardinal and archbishop from Vienna, Franz Xaver Nagl, cardinal and archbishop of Cologne, Felix von Hartmann, cardinal and archbishop of Prague Karel Kaspar, cardinal and archbishop of Olomouc Lev Skrbenský z Hříště, and bishop of Oradea Mare János Scheffler were all at some time residents at the college.

== Present day ==
The Pontifical Teutonic Institute S. Maria dell'Anima includes the church of the German-speaking Catholics in Rome and the adjacent Priests' College, a residential college of priests whose members study at one of the Pontifical Athenaeums for advanced studies or work in the Roman Curia. The Sunday service is a magnet for the German-speaking community in Rome, also because of the church music treasures that enrich the church year.

The position of rector is financed by the Austrian Bishops' Conference. The institute also has an archive that dates back to the institute's foundation as a hospice in the late 14th century.

== Rectors ==
The Anima rector is appointed by the Austrian Bishop conference. Since the foundation of the modern priest college in 1859 he is Austrian.

- Alois Flir (1805–1859), rector from 1853 to 1859
- Michael Gaßner, rector from 1860 to 1872
- Carl Jänig, rector from 1872 to 1887
- Franz Maria Doppelbauer (1845–1908), bishop, rector from 1887 to 1888
- Franz Xaver Nagl (1855–1913), archbishop, from 1888 to 1902
- Josef Lohninger (1866–1926), rector from 1902 to 1913
- Maximilian Brenner (1874–1937), rector from 1913 to 1937
- Alois Hudal (1885–1963), bishop, rector from 1937 to 1952, (Koadjutor cum iure successionis 1923–1937)
- Jakob Weinbacher (1901–1985), rector from 1952 to 1961
- Alois Stöger (1904–1999), bishop, rector from 1961 to 1967
- Franz Wasner (1905–1992), rector from 1967 to 1981
- Johannes Nedbal (1934–2002), rector from 1981 to 1998
- Richard Mathes (1940–2005), rector from 1998 to 2004
- Johann Hörist (1961–2007), rector from 2004 to 2007
- Gerhard Hörting (* 1972), Rector ad interim 2007/08
- Franz Xaver Brandmayr (* 1956), rector from 2008 to 2020
- Michael Max (* 1970), rector since September 2020

== See also ==
- Santa Maria dell'Anima - church
- Tamara Scheer, Negotiating National Character. The Habsburgs’ Roman Catholic Priest College Santa Maria dell’ Anima and the German National Church in Rome, 1859-1915, in: Austrian Studies 28 (2020), special issue "Fragments of Empire. Austrian Modernisms and the Habsburg Imaginary, edited by Deborah Holmes & Clemens Peck, 64-78.
