= Ferdinand van den Eynde =

Flemish art collector, art dealer and merchant

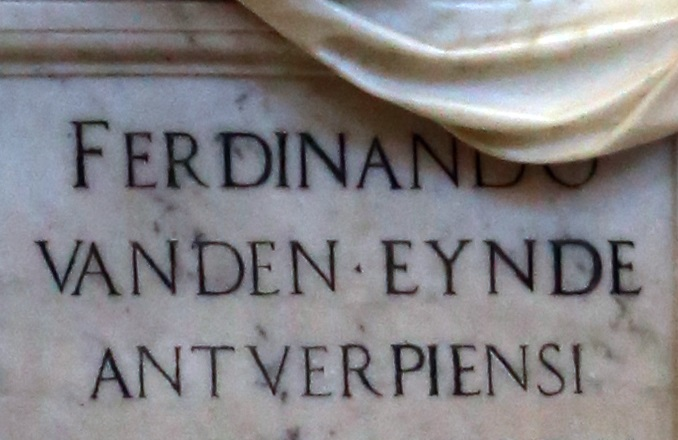
Epitaph of Ferdinand van den Eynde; Santa Maria dell'Anima, Rome

Ferdinand van den Eynde (early 17th century – 1630) was a Flemish art collector, art dealer and merchant. Ferdinand was part of the Van den Eynde family, and brother of the wealthy banker and merchant Jan van den Eynde. He should not be confused with the latter's son, Ferdinand. Ferdinand's collection included paintings by the likes of Pieter van Laer, Paul Bril, Peter Paul Rubens and Jan Miel. Ferdinand van den Eynde is also remembered for being the subject of Duquesnoy's Tomb of Ferdinand van den Eynde.

== Early life ==
Van den Eynde was born in Antwerp, into a wealthy family of artists and merchants. The Van den Eynde were related by blood and marriage to several prominent Netherlandish artists, including Brueghel, Jode, and Lucas and Cornelis de Wael. Lucas and Cornelis de Wael were Ferdinand's nephews. Ferdinand van den Eynde was married to Susanna de Jode, aunt of Jan Brueghel.

== Move to Italy ==
Sometime in the early 17th century (possibly in 1612), Van den Eynde moved to Italy, probably alone. He settled in Venice at first, where he reportedly was active between 1612 and 1617. While in Venice, he likely lived with his nephews Lucas and Cornelis de Wael.

He reportedly moved to Genoa in 1619, before finally settling in Southern Italy. Ferdinand was a resident of Naples until 1626, whereafter he moved to Rome.

He resided there for the rest of his life, dying prematurely in Rome in 1630. Van den Eynde was part of the Netherlandish community of expatriates in Rome.

Two days before his death, Van den Eynde made his will, bequeathing his art collection to his brother Jan, who had meanwhile come to Italy and settled in Naples.

Ferdinand van den Eynde was buried in the church of Santa Maria dell'Anima in Rome. His nephew Cornelis de Wael was buried next to him.

== Epitaph ==
Van den Eynde's tomb was commissioned from François Duquesnoy. Duquesnoy's work, located in the church of Santa Maria dell'Anima in Rome, was lauded by Duquesnoy's contemporaries, and remains much appreciated today, especially for its putti.
