= Jean-Robert Ango =

French painter

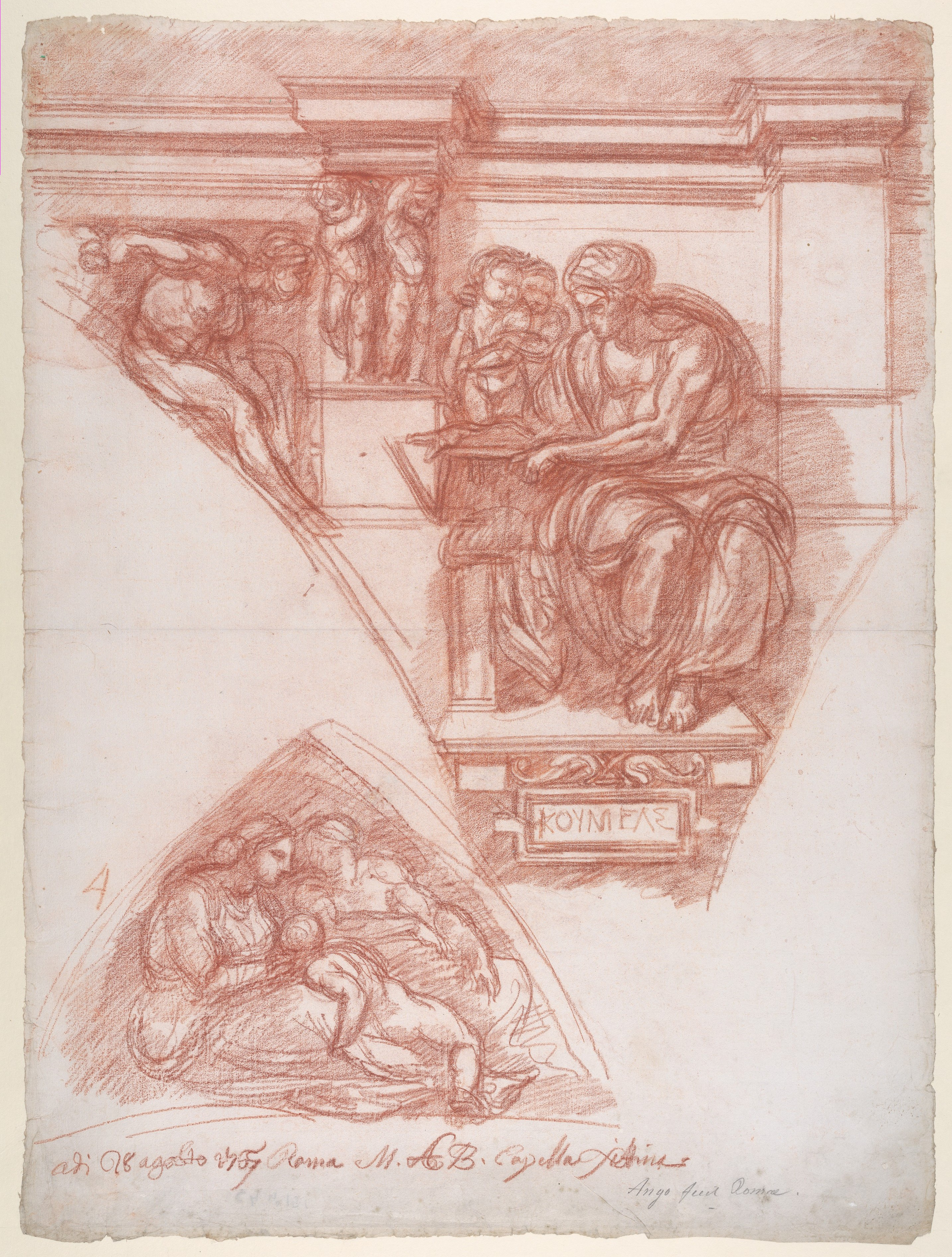
The Cumaean Sibyl (after Michelangelo), by Jean-Robert Ango, Metropolitan Museum of Art

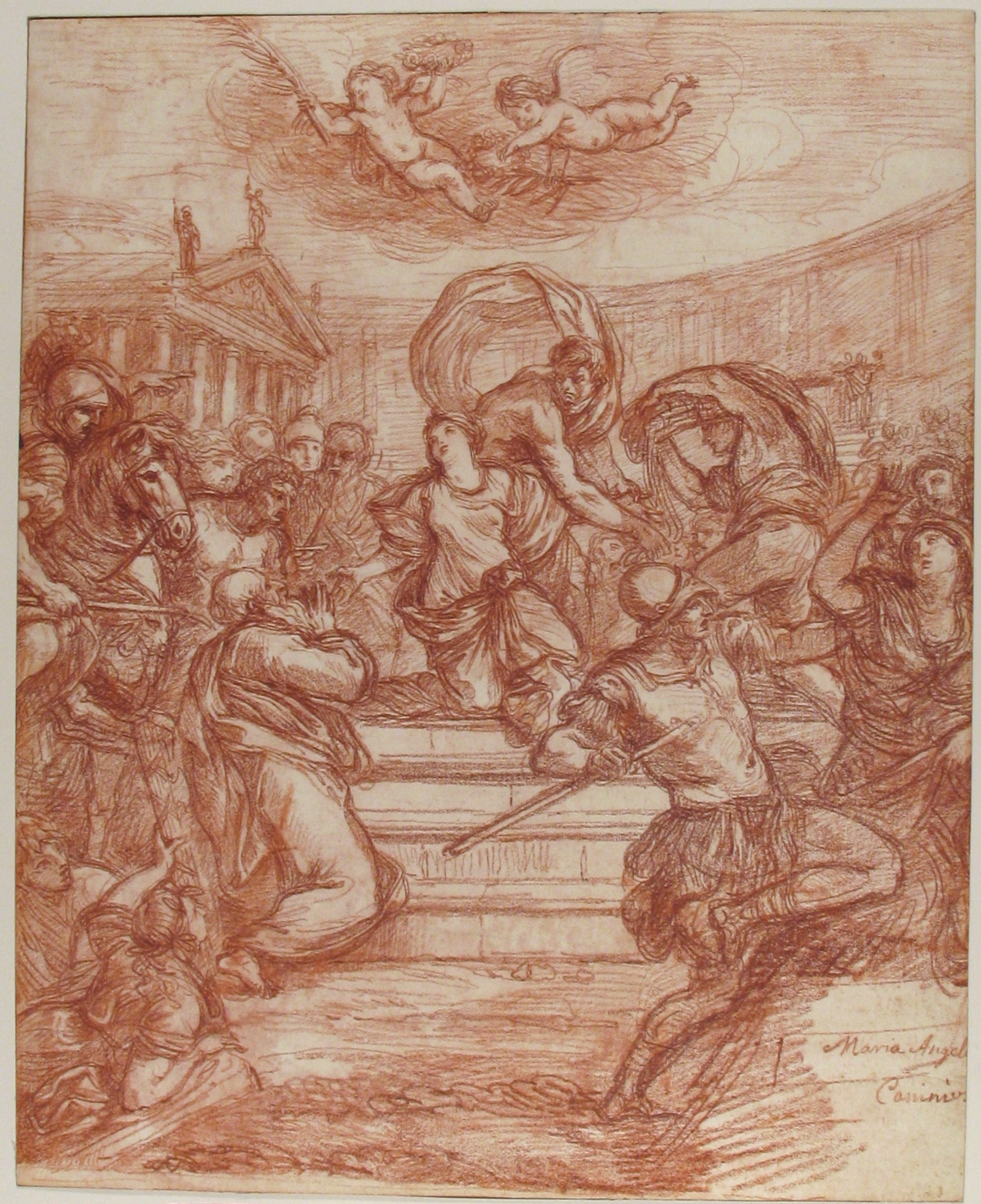
Scene of Martyrdom, after Giovanni Angelo Canini, Jean-Robert Ango, Metropolitan Museum of Art

Jean-Robert Ango (around 1710 – after August 16, 1773) was a French draughtsman and painter, noted for his numerous drawings rich in Italian and French ornament. He was born in France, and probably died in Rome. He lived and worked in Rome from 1759 to 1772. Nothing is known about his origins, his early life, his master, or how he got from France to Rome. Interest for Argo was renewed in the late 20th century and early 21st century, when four albums by Ango were acquired and exhibited by the Copper Hewitt National Design Museum, Smithsonian Institution. Julien's last mention of him was on January 16, 1773. According to French historian Pierre Rosenberg, Ango died in 1773.

== Life and career ==
=== Early life, move to Rome and career ===
Most biographical information on Ango comes to us through his friend Jean-Antoine Julien, a French painter. In his autobiography, Julien established that Ango was already in Rome in November 1760.

Ango's first patron was Jean-Claude Richard de Saint-Non, while his second and only other patron was Jacques Laure Le Tonnelier, le Bailli Breteuil (1723-1785). Ango's four albums in New York once belonged to the latter.

Ango surviving oeuvre consists entirely of drawings. Four paintings were recorded, but they are now lost. Julien described Ango as a painter as well. Most of his surviving drawings are of notable paintings and decorations in Roman churches and palaces; however, some attest a knowledge of Naples. In fact, on March 18, 1761, Ango and Jean-Honoré Fragonard were given permission to draw copies of the artwork in the gallery of Capodimonte, in Naples. Many of Ango's drawings are copies after Old Masters' paintings and sculptures, such as that of an untraced painting by Guercino, and Duquesnoy's Tomb of Ferdinand van den Eynde. In some instances, his copies are after some contemporary artists, and he also reworked counterproofs of drawings.

Ango recorded in drawing the paintings in Bailli de Breteuil's collection in Rome, who, as mentioned, was his second and only other patron besides Richard, and an ambassador of the Order of Malta to the Holy See from 1758 to 1780. In fact, in 1770 Ango referred to himself as dessinateur de M. le Bailli de Breteuil. His best known opus, however, is the collection of drawings after which 27 etchings were engraved by Jean-Claude Richard for his Recueil de griffonnis, de vues, paysages, fragments antiques et sujets historiques. All of them are copies of paintings located in Rome.

=== Later years, death and legacy ===
Pierre Rosenberg described Angos's final years in Rome as half-paralyzed, probably from a stroke. In fact, in 1772, in a letter to the Flemish painter Andries Cornelis Lens, Julien, Ango's contemporary, referred to an attack of apoplexy that had left Ango half-paralyzed (the term apoplexy once referred to what today is called a stroke).

Ango depended on the selling of his drawings as his only source of income. He was reduced to living on charity, begging in the streets.

Interest for Ango and his oeuvre was renewed when four of his albums came into possession of the Copper Hewitt National Design Museum, Smithsonian Institution. The albums comprise 151 drawings, all executed in red chalk, on an average size of 215 x 148 mm. In these albums, when the drawings are after paintings, they almost never depict the full work, but rather study details. On the other hand, drawings after sculpture usually show the full form. These drawings are valuable in that they record the state of paintings and sculptures in Rome in the late 18th century. Further, they may depict Roman sculpture and paintings now lost; despite diligent search, only half of the subjects depicted in Ango's oeuvre have been identified. However, there is no known original composition by Argo, as all his extant drawings are after opera by other artists.

Ango's personal drawing style has only recently been recognized. For a long period after the eighteenth century, his drawings were attributed to Hubert Robert, whose drawings Ango copied and whose counterproofs he drew over. Ango habitually signed his drawings H. Roberti (H for Hannibal, his nickname) and Roberti for Robert, his last name. His drawings were (and still are) confused with those of Robert, many of them being signed "Roberti." Over the past few decades, drawings in the collections of various museums, such as Harvard's, have been reattributed. However, many of Robert's drawings, in particular those at the Louvre, remain contested.

Gallery

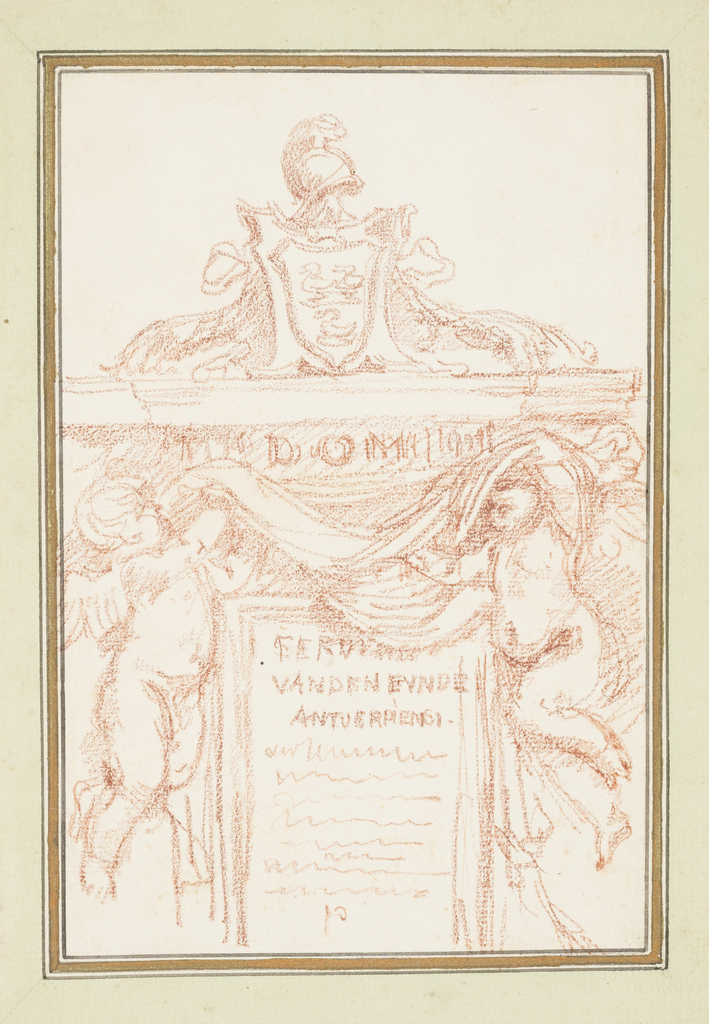

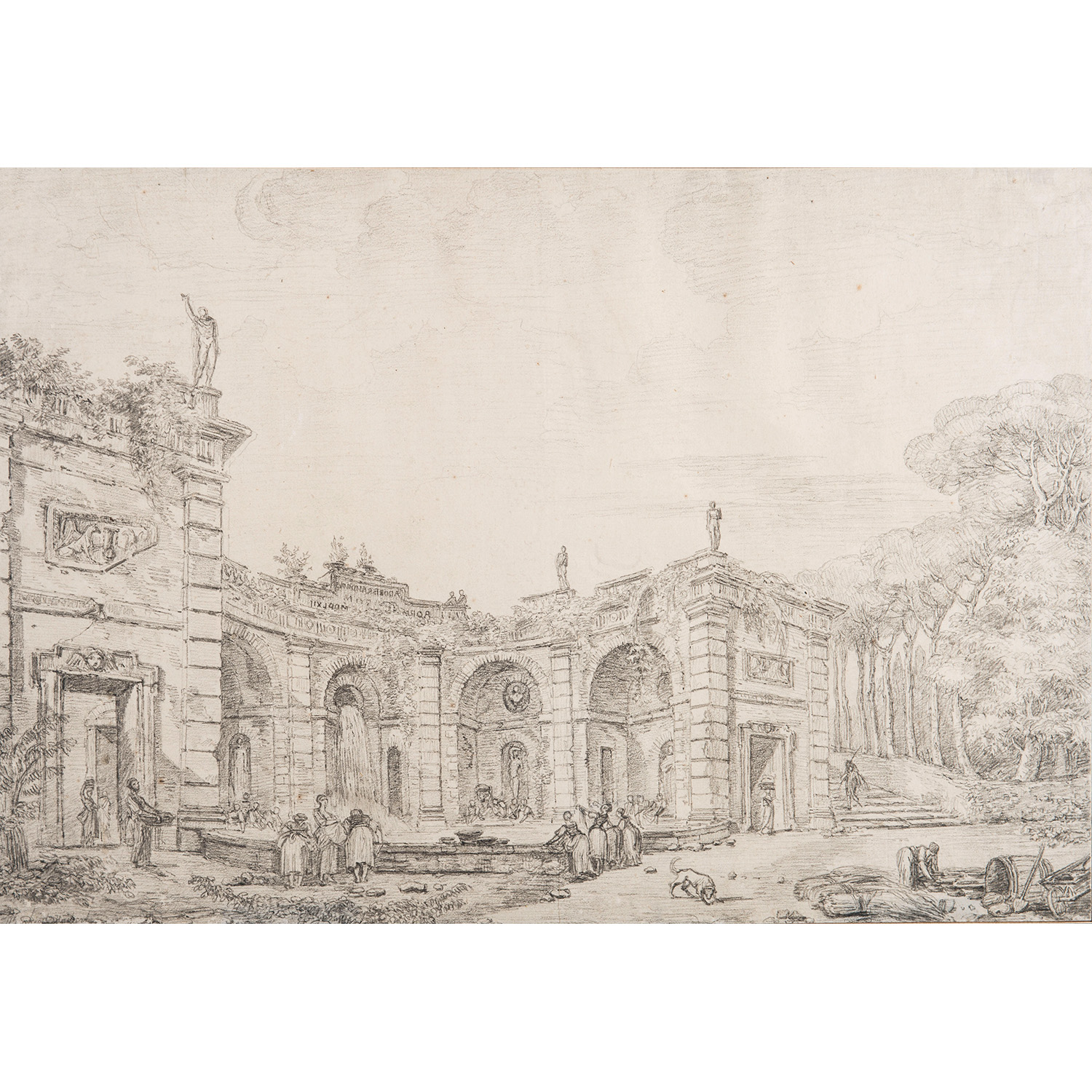

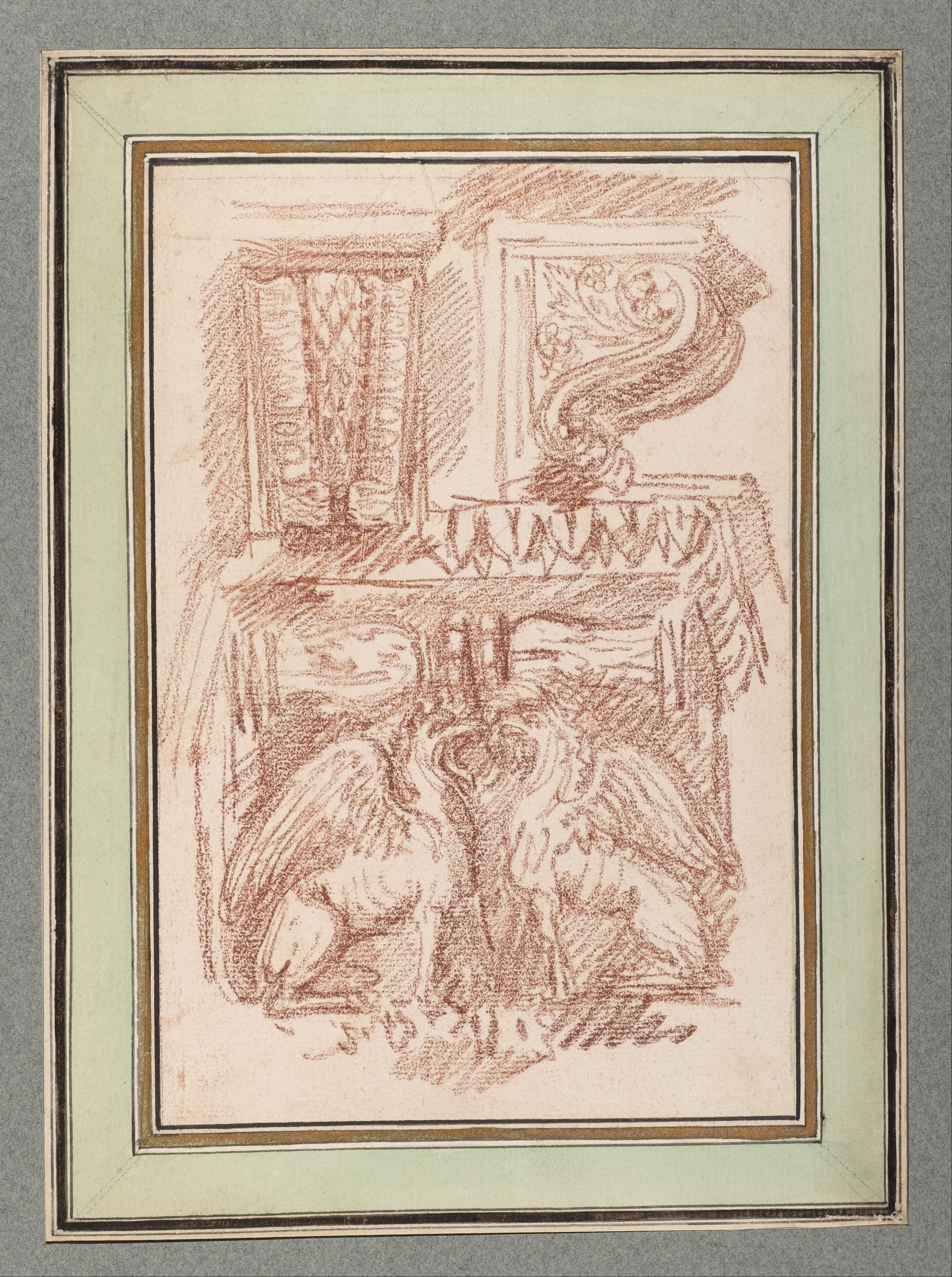

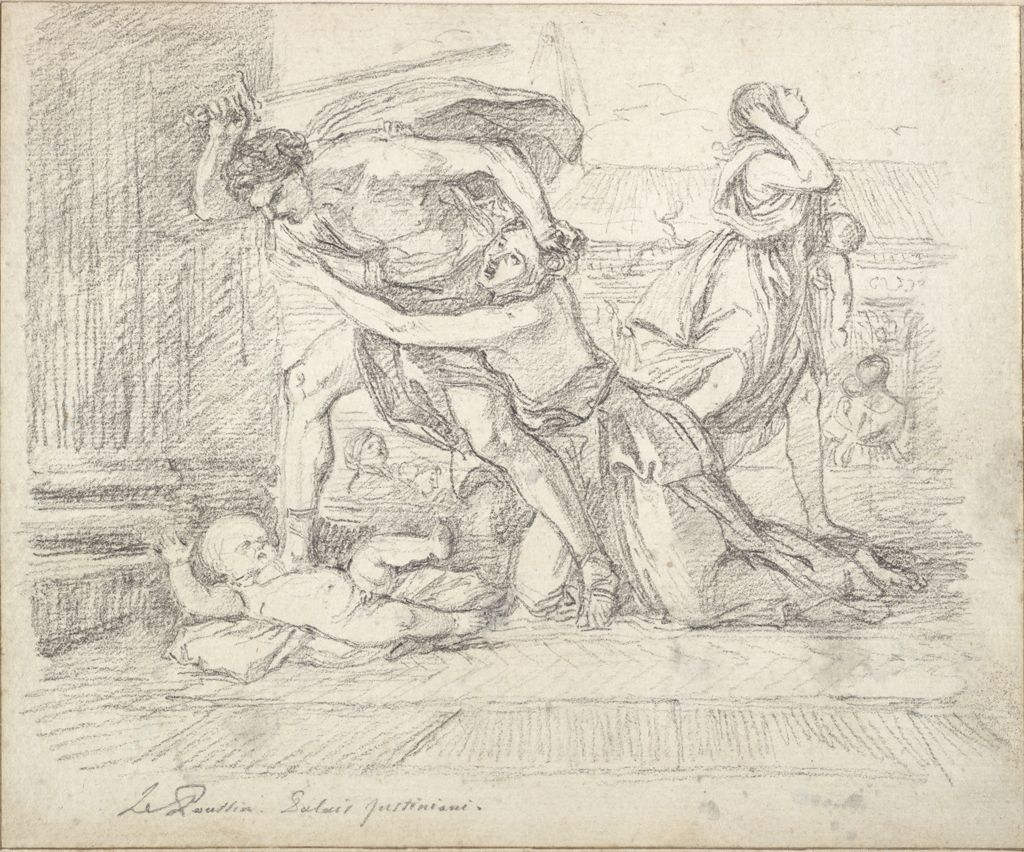

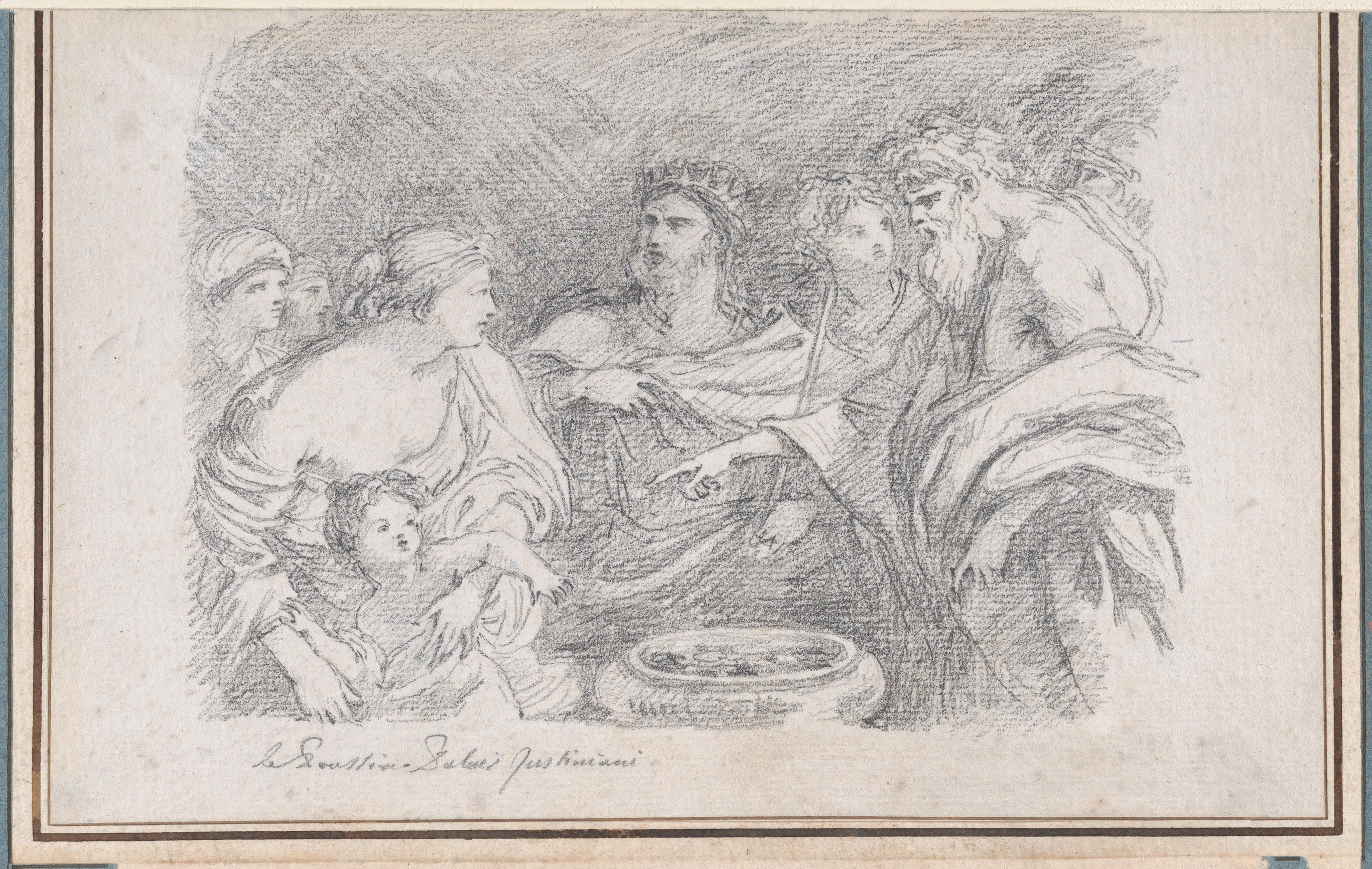

== Sources ==
- Hellyer, M.-E. (1996). "Ango [Angot], Jean-Robert". Hellyer. Oxford University Press. doi:10.1093/gao/9781884446054.article.T002973. Archived from the original on 2018-03-17.
- Massar, Phyllis Dearborn (1999). "Drawings by Jean-Robert Ango after paintings and sculptures in Rome". Master Drawings. 37 (1). Spring- Master Drawings Association: 35–46. JSTOR 1554405.
- "Jean-Robert Ango". Dictionary of Art & Artists.
