= Michael Matheus =

German historian (born 1953)

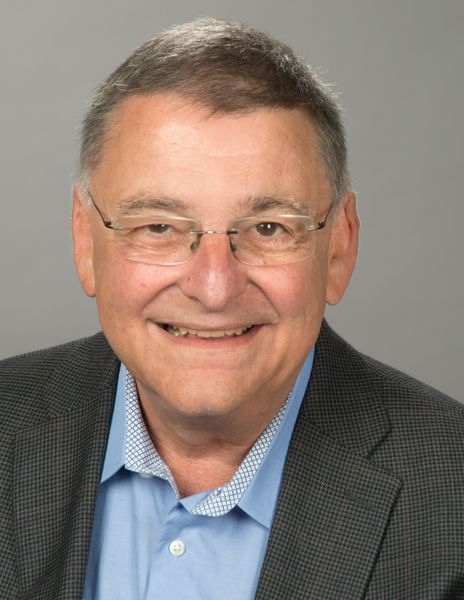
- Born: March 27, 1953; Graach
- Occupation: Professor
- Employer: University of Mainz

Michael Matheus (born 27 March 1953, in Graach) is a German historian.

== Life ==
Michael Matheus graduated from the Friedrich-Wilhelm-Gymnasium (Trier) in 1971. He studied history, political science and German at the universities of Trier, Bonn and Münster. After passing the state examination for secondary school teachers, he received his doctorate in Trier in 1981 under Alfred Haverkamp with the thesis “Trier at the End of the Middle Ages”. He was then a research assistant for medieval history at the University of Trier.

From 1986 to 1988 Matheus was a DFG scholarship holder and attached to the German Historical Institute (DHI) in Rome. In 1990, he completed his habilitation in Medieval History and Regional History at the University of Trier with an unpublished work on what in German is called Zensualität, focusing on relations between ecclesiastical institutions in the High Middle Ages and those laypeople who owed them certain taxes or dues in cash or kind. In 1990/91, he was a guest lecturer at the DHI in Rome and a lecturer at the University of Rome "La Sapienza". After working as a university lecturer at the University of Trier, he became Professor of Medieval History at the University GHS Essen in 1993. From 1994 to 2018, Michael Matheus taught and researched as Professor of Medieval and Modern History and Comparative Regional History at the Johannes Gutenberg University Mainz. From 1994 to 2003 and from 2013 to 2020, he was again 1st Chairman and Director of the Institute of Regional History at the University of Mainz (IGL).

From October 2002 to September 2012, he served as director of the German Historical Institute in Rome. In 2008, to mark the 150th birthday of the former director Ludwig Quidde, the German Historical Institute in Rome dedicated a conference to the historian and Nobel Peace Prize winner. The contributions were published by Matheus in 2012. In 2011, on the occasion of the 500th anniversary of Martin Luther's journey to Rome, the German Historical Institute in Rome organized a conference. The Rome journey was often associated with the question of how far it can be regarded as a precondition for the Reformation. The resulting anthology was published by Matheus together with Arnold Nesselrath and Martin Wallraff in 2017 and appeared in Italian translation in 2019.

From October 2012 to September 2018, he was again professor and head of the Department of Medieval and Modern History and Comparative Regional History at the Johannes Gutenberg University Mainz. Since September 2011, he has also been a member of the board of directors of the Roman Institute of the Görres Society (RIGG). From 2013 to 2021 he was chairman of the German Study Centre in Venice.

Since the 1990s, Matheus has promoted the connection between historical research and new media (digital humanities). Various regional portals were created under his leadership at the IGL. Since 2003, he has initiated several electronic publication formats at the DHI in Rome, which have been accessible on the platform "Romana Repertoria online/Roman Repertories online (RRO)" since 2012. In 2015, "mainzed - Mainz Centre for Digitality in the Humanities and Cultural Studies" was founded in Mainz. The IGL is one of the six founding members that concentrate their digital competence at the scholarly hub of Mainz. A new master’s program, "Digital Methodology in the Humanities and Cultural Studies," has been offered at the Johannes Gutenberg University since WS 2016/17.

== Research ==
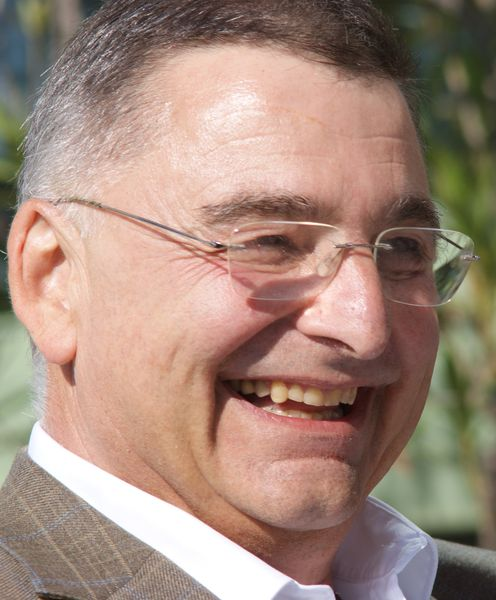
Michael Matheus, taken by Werner Maleczek during the 2014 autumn meeting of the Constance Working Group on the Reichenau

His research focuses on comparative studies of European history, especially of Germany and Italy in the High and Late Middle Ages, including the history of rural and urban settlements, the history of wine, the history of education and universities, the history of transport and trade, Christians and Muslims in southern Italy, the papacy, the Curia and Rome in the Renaissance. He also studies the history of national research cultures and their networking in international academic relations.

In his dissertation, he examined the constitutional and socio-historical situation of Trier in the late Middle Ages, mainly on the basis of municipal accounts. The treasurer’s accounts evaluated by Matheus are virtually complete for the period from 1370 to 1520. This is the first time that historical account books have been analyzed in this way to illuminate general aspects of the city's history. In addition, this study examined the members of nine leading Trier families, incorporating aspects of educational history. In another extensive study, he devoted himself to harbor cranes in the period between 1300 and 1600, with a geographical focus on the Rhine and its tributaries between Strasbourg and Düsseldorf. In doing so, he placed this technical innovation in its economic, socio-historical and cultural historical context.

=== History of hospitals and welfare institutions ===
Another focus is the history of hospitals and welfare institutions. The conference "Functional and Structural Change of Late Medieval Hospitals in European Comparison," which Matheus chaired in Alzey in 1999, was based on the thesis that "the capacity for structural change ... seems to be virtually constitutive for the long-term existence of hospitals and thus also for their history." The conference was acknowledged as a milestone in German hospital research. The proven differentiation of various types of hospitals inspired an intensive discussion of the concept of the hospital and its scope. The conference was also a great success.

=== History of education, science and universities ===
His studies of university history in the region of the Holy Roman Empire north of the Alps are primarily concerned with the competing universities in Trier and Mainz in the fifteenth and twentieth centuries. Matheus was the author of the book “The History of Universities.”

At a conference in Tübingen in 1996 dedicated to the repeatedly noted second wave of university foundings in the fifteenth century, Matheus argued for a European comparative view of late medieval university history. Where as Nicholas of Cusa had previously been claimed as the author of the papal foundation privilege of February 2, 1455 for the University of Trier, Matheus proved that the text of the bull largely corresponds to that of the bulls for Besançon (1450) and Glasgow (1451). In addition, he suggested relativizing the thesis of a second wave of university foundations in the Roman-German Empire from a comparative European perspective. Matheus analyzed the foundings of the universities in Trier and Mainz in the context of intensive efforts at church reform and a general educational awakening in the Roman-German Empire, especially from the middle of the fifteenth century. Matheus also showed that the first wave of university foundings in the Roman-German Empire was not a first wave.

According to recent local and general scholarly literature and journalism, the Electoral University of Mainz was closed by the French in 1798. Matheus showed that documents proving a formal closure do not yet exist. Rather, in 1798 the university was transformed into a French central school, which, however, continued to be viewed, in both its own and foreign perceptions, as the Université de Mayence. In a process extending over many years, academic operations were then gradually terminated. Repeated attempts to re-establish Mainz as a university location in the nineteenth and twentieth centuries failed. However, some institutions, above all the Mainz University Fund, which was founded in the eighteenth century and still exists today, kept the memory of the old university alive. The opening of the university in 1946, now named after the inventor of the art of printing Johannes Gutenberg, which was pushed through against competitors (especially Trier), was deliberately staged as a re-foundation by the French and German side. Michael Matheus initiated the re-founding of the university in 2013.

In 2013, Michael Matheus initiated intensified studies on the curia and city university of Rome in the Renaissance period with his inaugural lecture on comparative European university history at the DHI in Rome. His thesis is that the importance of the Roman university location has been considerably underestimated thus far, especially for the period after the permanent return of the popes to the city. Although many sources on Roman university history are lost in situ, the time-consuming indexing and evaluation of the fragments of sources preserved in numerous Roman/Vatican and European archives as well as libraries opens up the possibility of reassessing Rome as a university location, which has long been undervalued. The concept of the place of study, coined by Matheus, is also intended to direct our view beyond the university institutions to the considerable spectrum of possibilities for acquiring education in Rome during the Renaissance. The current research findings have been presented in an anthology edited with Rainer Christoph Schwinges.

In the book Germania in Italia (2015), in the volume Orte der Zuflucht und personeller Netzwerke initiated by him, as well as in further studies, Matheus— starting from the history of the German research institutes in Rome and Florence as well as the Unione internazionale degli istituti di archeologia, storia e storia dell'arte in Rome— examines traditions and ruptures in various research traditions, knowledge cultures, and forms of multinational cooperation as well as the emergence of new research paradigms in the nineteenth and twentieth centuries and their political instrumentalization. Despite the catastrophe of two world wars, the studies point to a considerable degree of resilience in the field of institutionalized international cooperation, not least thanks to personal networks.

=== Christians and Muslims in Southern Italy ===
Since 2005/06, Matheus has established a new interdisciplinary and internationally oriented research paradigm at the DHI focusing on Christians and Muslims in Southern Italy, which is being pursued in various projects to complement and replace the research on the southern Italian forts from the Hohenstaufen-Angevin period conducted there for decades. From a comparative perspective, the Mediterranean region as a whole also comes into view, especially the spaces of encounter and conflict in the Levant and on the Iberian Peninsula, which are characterized by monotheistic religions and are important for Europe. Together with Lukas Clemens, he is running a project on Christian-Muslim coexistence and competition in northern Apulia (Capitanata), a region that is particularly suitable for the spatial analyses using cultural historical lines of inquiry that are being discussed for different religions and cultures at the DHI. Matheus has demonstrated that the assessment of Lucera as a Muslim enclave, a garrison or an Arab ghetto in a Christian environment, which has dominated since the nineteenth century (expressed, among others, by Ferdinand Gregorovius), is in need of correction. Rather, Muslims settled in a whole series of formerly Christian settlements in southern Italy, including the episcopal see of Tertiveri, which was established in Byzantine times and is a particular focus of the research. He also relates these research findings to current debates such as those on the supposed "clash of civilizations" or the role of Islam in Europe. The results of the research are presented on L.I.S.A. - The Science Portal of the Gerda Henkel Foundation in a film sequence in German, English and Italian. Richard Engl's Trier dissertation was also written in the context of the project. The film is available in German, English and Italian.

=== Wine history ===
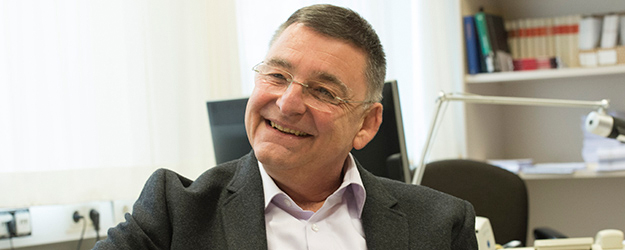
Michael Matheus (2016)

As a doctoral student, the historian, who comes from a winegrowing family on his mother's side, discovered the oldest record to date that can be linked to Riesling cultivation on the Moselle. Since then, he has presented numerous studies on the history of the cultivation and culture of wine on the Rhine and Moselle, as well as on processes of continuity, but above all of structural change in wine-growing regions from antiquity to the twentieth century from a comparative European perspective. Together with Lukas Clemens, he investigated continuities in wine-pressing techniques between antiquity and the Middle Ages and proposed a new interpretation for a much-cited passage on wine-pressing techniques in the famous Capitulare de villis from the time of Charlemagne. Furthermore, he demonstrated that practices in the wine trade and wine production, the accompanying imperial legal standardizations and mental patterns in the fifteenth century in the Holy Roman Empire were not simply of a very different nature from those in the Middle Ages. They were also taken up by the German wine law of 1909 as principles of quality wine production that were unique in Europe. Matheus developed a heuristic instrument for comparative European studies on the history of the cultivation and culture of wine with the type of the winegrowers' village, a rural settlement with a pronounced urban character already found in the early Middle Ages. Matheus also showed that the winegrowers' village had a pronounced urban character.

As a quasi-urban settlement fulfilling the criteria of the type in the Middle Ages, Matheus studied the wine economy of Bassano del Grappa, which is currently internationally known for its production of grappa. He showed that before the production of grape marc spirits, high quality wines were produced there and exported north and east across the Alps for centuries. Bassano wine was counted among the heavy and sweet southern wines, which also included more widespread varieties such as Malvasia, Romania and Rainfal. These were imbibed mainly on special occasions and were considerably more expensive than local wines. In acts of demonstrative wine consumption, they were used to mark and affirm social rank.

==== Studies on the history of Mainz and Rheinhessen ====
In the Festschrift for his predecessor at Mainz University, Alois Gerlich, which Matheus initiated, he explained that the religious topography and architecture of Mainz, as well as the furnishing of churches with patron saints and relics since the early Middle Ages, refer to a "program" of imitation of Rome, in which the new construction of the cathedral under Archbishop Willigis, modelled on "Old Saint Peter’s" in Rome, is a particularly striking element, through which the archbishops of Mainz expressed their ecclesiastical-political claims. The findings have been noted in comparative studies of architectural and church history.

== Editorship ==
=== As author ===
- Trier am Ende des Mittelalters. Studien zur Wirtschafts-, Sozial- und Verfassungsgeschichte der Stadt Trier vom 14. bis 16. Jahrhundert (Trierer Historische Forschungen 5), Trier 1984, ISBN 978-3923087044
- Alma Mater Treverensis. Die "alte" Trierer Universität von 1473-1798. Katalog zur Ausstellung anläßlich des 10-jährigen Bestehens der Universität Trier, Trier 1980
- Hafenkrane. Zur Geschichte einer mittelalterlichen Maschine am Rhein und seinen Nebenflüssen von Straßburg bis Düsseldorf (Trierer Historische Forschungen 9), Trier 1985, ISBN 978-3923087044
- Weinproduktion und Weinkonsum im Mittelalter. Zur Einführung, in: Weinproduktion und Weinkonsum im Mittelalter (Geschichtliche Landeskunde 51), hrsg. von M. Matheus, Stuttgart 2004, ISBN 978-3515069731
- Mainz zur Zeit des Johannes Gutenberg, in: Lebenswelten Johannes Gutenbergs (Mainzer Vorträge 10), Stuttgart 2005, ISBN 978-3515077286
- Nikolaus von Kues, seine Familiaren und die Anima, in: M. Matheus (Hrsg.), S. Maria dell’Anima. Zur Geschichte einer ‚deutschen‘ Stiftung in Rom (Bibliothek des Deutschen Historischen Instituts in Rom 121), Berlin-New York 2010, ISBN 978-3110231021
- Vatikan, Campo Santo und der Kampf um die deutschen wissenschaftlichen Institute in Italien 1945–1953, in: M. Matheus und S. Heid (Hrsg.), Orte der Zuflucht und personeller Netzwerke. Der Campo Santo Teutonico und der Vatikan 1933–1955 (Römische Quartalschrift für christliche Altertumskunde und Kirchengeschichte: Supplementband 63), Freiburg im Breisgau [u. a.] 2015, ISBN 978-3451309304
- Germania in Italia. Incontri fra storici nel contesto internazionale, Rom 2015, ISBN 978-88-9825-200-8
- "Sola fides sufficit". 'Deutsche' Akademiker und Notare in Rom 1510/12, in: Michael Matheus, Arnold Nesselrath, Martin Wallraff (Hrsg.): Martin Luther in Rom. Die ewige Stadt als kosmopolitisches Zentrum und ihre Wahrnehmung (Bibliothek des Deutschen Historischen Instituts in Rom 134), Berlin/Boston 2017, ISBN 978-3110309065
- Das Renaissancepapsttum: Forschungsstand und Perspektiven, in: Michael Matheus, Bernd Schneidmüller, Stefan Weinfurter, Alfried Wieczorek (Hrsg.): Die Päpste der Renaissance. Politik, Kunst und Musik (Die Päpste 2), Regensburg 2017, ISBN 978-3795430887
- Papst- und Romkritik in der Renaissance, in: Michael Matheus, Bernd Schneidmüller, Stefan Weinfurter, Alfried Wieczorek (Hrsg.): Die Päpste der Renaissance. Politik, Kunst und Musik (Die Päpste 2), Regensburg 2017, ISBN 978-3795430887
- Lucara, Tertiveri; Bischofsstadt und Bischofssitz. Muslimische Stadt und muslimische Adelsresidenz, Genese eines interdisziplinären Forschungsprojektes zur Geschichte Süditaliens, in: Lukas Clemens u. Michael Matheus (Hrsg.): Christen und Muslime in der Capitanata im 13. Jahrhundert. Archäologie und Geschichte (Interdisziplinärer Dialog zwischen Archäologie und Geschichte 4), Trier 2018, ISBN 978-3898902144

=== As publisher ===
- Herausgeber der Reihe Wirtschaftsgeschichte des rheinland-pfälzischen Raums. Veröffentlichungen des Instituts für Geschichtliche Landeskunde an der Universität Mainz e. V. (since 2020)
- Mitherausgeberschaft der Reihe Mainzer Beiträge zur Demokratiegeschichte. Veröffentlichungen des Instituts für Geschichtliche Landeskunde an der Universität Mainz e. V. (since 2019)
- Mitherausgeberschaft der Reihe Die Päpste, Schnell & Steiner Verlag, Regensburg (2016/2017)
- Mitherausgeberschaft der Reihe Beiträge zur Geschichte der Juden in Rheinland-Pfalz. Veröffentlichungen des Instituts für Geschichtliche Landeskunde an der Universität Mainz e. V. (since 2016)
- Geschichtliche Landeskunde. Veröffentlichungen des Instituts für Geschichtliche Landeskunde an der Universität Mainz, Vol. 42 (1995) until Vol. 50 (2000), Vol. 52 (2001); Vol. 55 (2002); since Vol. 71 (2014)
- Studi. Schriftenreihe des Deutschen Studienzentrums in Venedig / Centro Tedesco di Studi Veneziani, Neue Folge (since Volume XIII)
- Mainzer Vorträge. Vortragsreihe des Instituts für Geschichtliche Landeskunde an der Universität Mainz, Franz Steiner, Stuttgart
- Mitherausgeberschaft der Reihe Monographien zur Geschichte des Mittelalters. Anton Hiersemann, Stuttgart (2007-2016)
- Mitherausgeberschaft des Journal of Medieval History. Elsevier, London (since 2007)
- Bibliothek des Deutschen Historischen Instituts in Rom. Max Niemeyer, Tübingen ab Bd. 105 bis Bd. 129 (2003–2014)
- Ricerche dell'Istituto Storico Germanico di Roma. Viella, Rom ab Bd. 1 bis Bd. 9 (2007–2013)
- Quellen und Forschungen aus italienischen Archiven und Bibliotheken. Max Niemeyer, Tübingen since Vol. 82 until Vol. 92 (2002–2012)

A complete list of his editorship can be found on the website of Johannes Gutenberg University Mainz.
