= Santa Maria dell'Anima =

- English: Our Lady of the Soul; German: Kirche der deutschsprachigen katholischen Gemeinde und des Päpstlichen Instituts Santa Maria dell’Anima in Rom
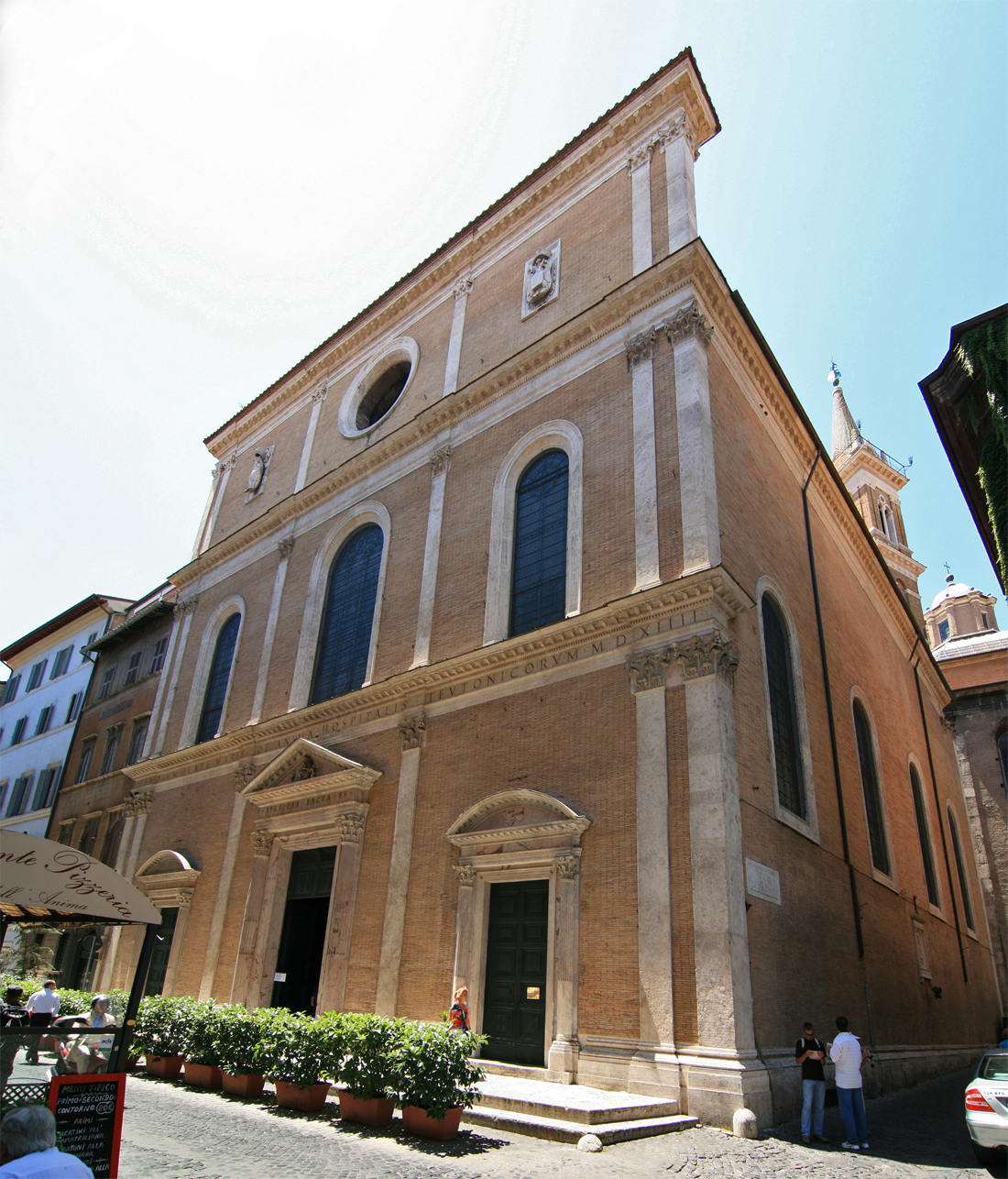
- Façade of the church.
- Click on the map for a fullscreen view
- 41°53′59.1″N 12°28′19.3″E
- Location: Via di Santa Maria dell'Anima 64, Ponte, Rome
- Country: Italy
- Denomination: Catholic Church
- Tradition: Roman Rite
- Website: https://pisma.it/

History
- Status: National church for Austria & Germany
- Dedication: Mary, mother of Jesus
- Consecrated: 1542

Architecture
- Architect(s): Andrea Sansovino, Giuliano da Sangallo
- Architectural type: Church
- Style: hall church
- Groundbreaking: 1386
- Completed: 1522

Specifications
- Length: 40 metres (130 ft)
- Width: 30 metres (98 ft)

Clergy
- Rector: Michael Max

Santa Maria dell'Anima (English: Our Lady of the Soul) is a church in central Rome, Italy, just west of the Piazza Navona and near the Santa Maria della Pace church. It was founded during the course of the 14th century by Dutch merchants, who at that time belonged to the Holy Roman Empire. In the course of the 15th century, it became the national church of the whole Holy Roman Empire in Rome and henceforth the so-called German national church and hospice of German-speaking people in Rome. In some sources this institution is called Austrian since Habsburg emperors were its protectors.

According to tradition, the church received its name, from the picture of Our Lady which forms its coat of arms (the Blessed Virgin between two souls). Among the artworks housed inside is the Holy Family by Giulio Romano. It is the resting place of the Dutch Pope Adrian VI as well as of Cardinals William of Enckenvoirt and Andrew of Austria.

== History ==
=== 14th and 15th century ===
Santa Maria dell'Anima is one of the many medieval charity institutions built for pilgrims in Rome. The church found its origin in 1350, when Johannes (Jan) and Katharina Peters of Dordrecht bought three houses and turned it into a private hospice for pilgrims, at the occasion of the Jubilee of 1350. Jan Peters may have been a Dutch merchant or papal soldier; Dordrecht belonged to a region which later became independent as the Netherlands. They named the hospice "Beatae Mariae Animarum" ("Blessed Mary's of the Souls"). It was erected on its present site in 1386. In the 15th century Santa Maria dell'Anima expanded to be a hostel for visitors from the entire Holy Roman Empire, though initially the occupants were primarily from the Low Countries and (from the middle 15th century) the Rhineland.

The foundation of the hospice was confirmed by the bull of Pope Boniface IX on 9 November 1399, which granted it indulgences. In 1406, it was raised to the rank of a national institution and united with a Brotherhood governed by Provisors and a Congregation. On 21 May 1406 Pope Innocent VII in his bull Piae Postulatio declared the hospice exempt from all but papal jurisdiction, and took it under his immediate protection. In 1418, it was greatly enriched by the legacy of its second founder, Diedrich of Niem.

The Popes of the fifteenth century, with the exception of Pope Sixtus IV, showed it great favor. In 1431 a church was built on the place of the hospice's chapel (consecrated by Pope Eugene IV in 1444) and the community was united with the German hospice of St. Andrew which had been founded in 1372 by the priest Nicholas of Kulm. During the fifteenth and sixteenth centuries Santa Maria dell'Anima became the national and religious centre as well as burial place in Rome of the Holy Roman Empire.

=== 16th-17th century ===
Prominent citizens of the Holy Roman Empire residing in Rome became members of the Confraternity of Santa Maria dell'Anima, including William of Orange's eldest son, Philip William. Johann Burchard from Strasbourg joined the Confraternity of Santa Maria dell'Anima and rose to be its provost at the end of the 15th century. While he held this office, the decision was made to rebuild the church for the Jubilee of 1500. The present church which owes its Renaissance style to the influence of Bramante, was built by German subscriptions, between 1499 and 1522. It stands on the site of the older church, built between 1431 and 1499, and was decorated by the great artists of the period.

The church was built in the style of a hall church that was typical for Northern Europe, but which sits awkwardly amid the Italianate churches of Rome. Andrea Sansovino was retained as architect. The facade was completed by Giuliano da Sangallo. The new church was consecrated only on 25 November 1542.

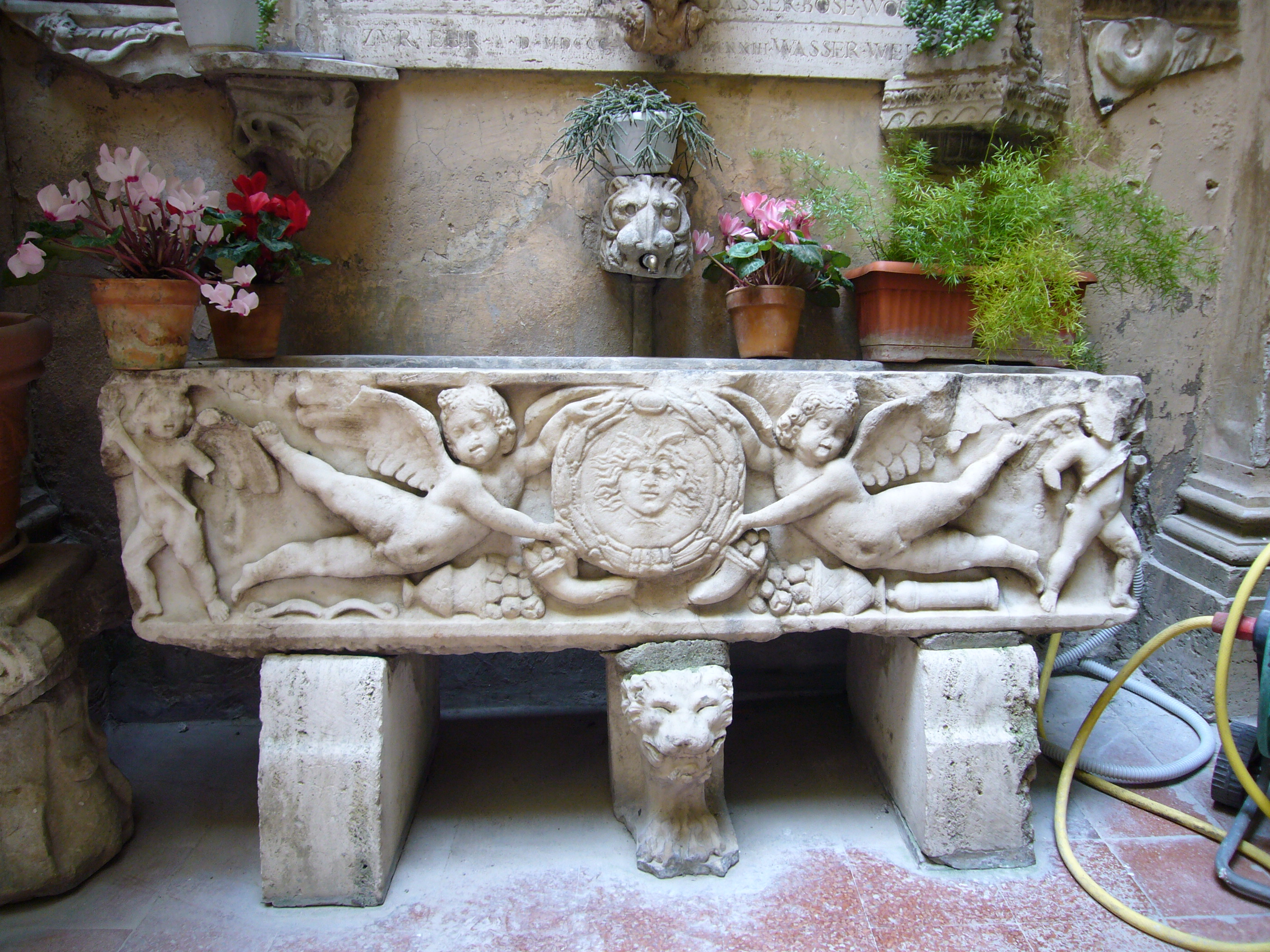
Roman sarcophagus in the courtyard.

In 1699, Leopold I announced that Santa Maria dell'Anima would be placed under his personal protection. This made it more of a Hapsburg church than strictly German.

=== 18th-20th century ===
During the Napoleonic occupation, the church was plundered and the sacristy used as a horse stable. In 1844, the (new) Belgian community moved to the Church of St. Julian of the Flemings. Under the influence of the era's nationalism, in 1859 a priest college was founded, named the Collegio Teutonico di Santa Maria dell' Anima. However, although being propagated as a German institution, it was until 1918 under the patronage of the Habsburg emperors, and priests had many other European nationalities than only German.

In 1937 a chapel was built in commemoration of the First World War soldiers. Underneath about 450 soldiers, most of them unidentified, from Austria-Hungary were buried who died in POW camps in the vicinity of Rome. A project led by Tamara Scheer and Nikolaus Rottenberger with the support of the Austrian Ministry of Defense, has started in 2021 aiming to identify these soldiers.

Later the institution served as a ratline to aid Nazi war criminals such as Gustav Wagner and Franz Stangl in their flight from justice. Dutch Catholics retained the Anima as their national church, but after extended conflicts left it in 1939 (since 1992 the San Michele dei Frisoni near the Vatican has taken that role).

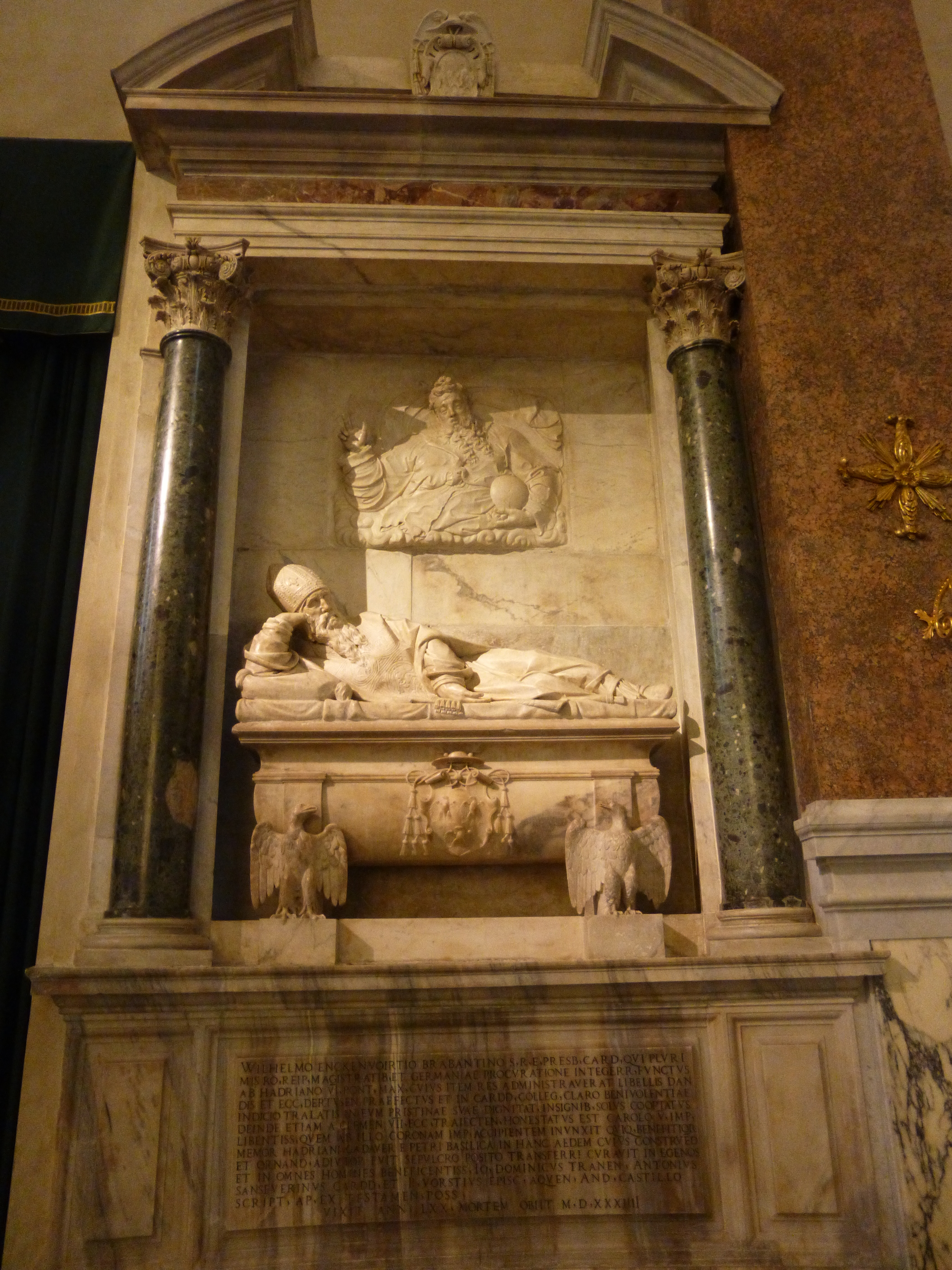
Tomb of Cardinal Willem van Enckevoirt

The inscriptions found in Santa Maria dell'Anima, a valuable source illustrating the history of the church, have been collected and published by Vincenzo Forcella.

During the Second Vatican Council, Joseph Ratzinger, the future Pope Benedict XVI, attempted to find lodging at the German pilgrim hostel at Santa Maria Dell'Anima, but was turned away due to no vacancy. Instead, he found lodging at the temporary priest residence across the street. The church itself is now used exclusively as a parish for the German-speaking people of Rome.

== Interior ==
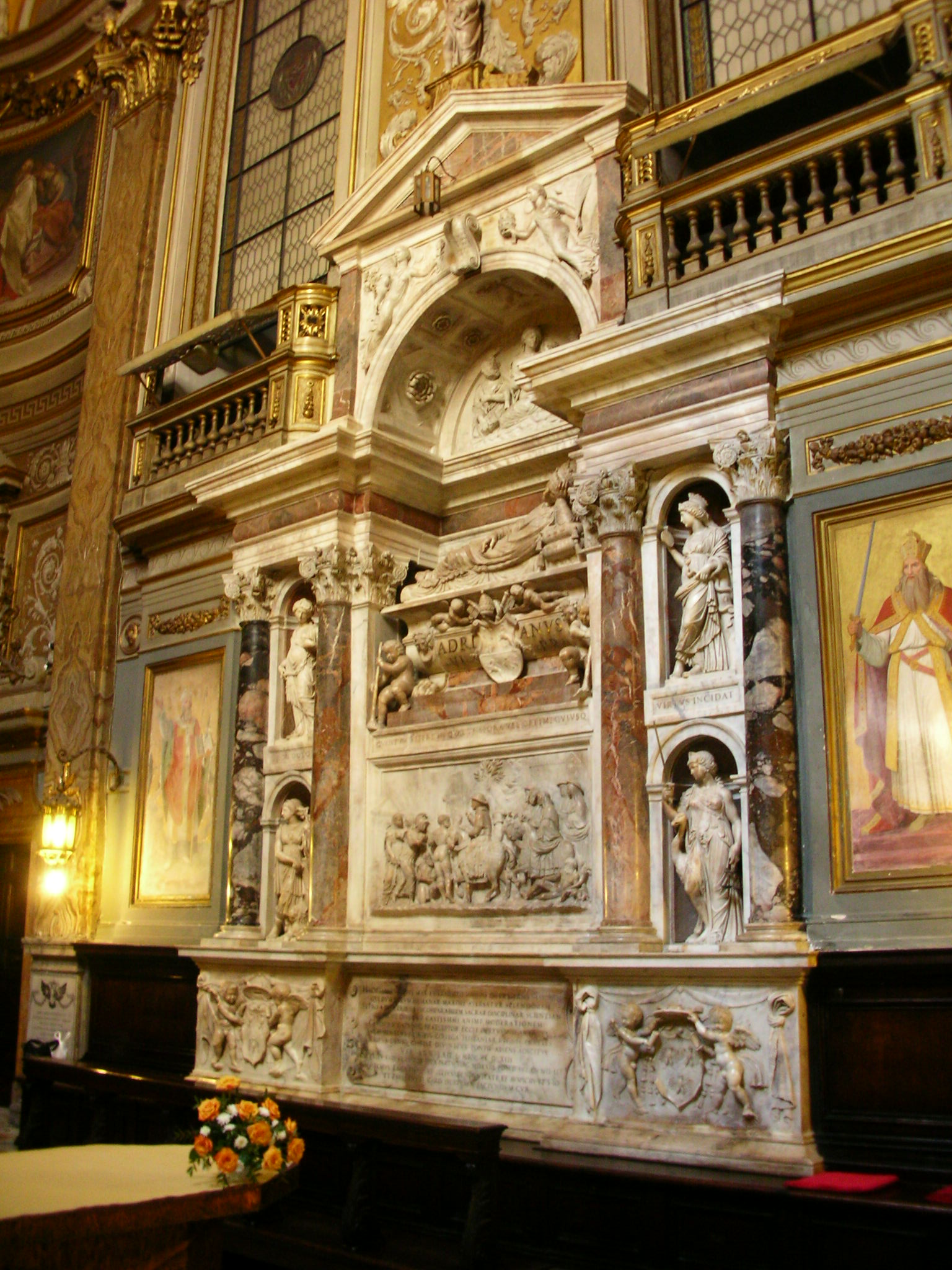
Funeral monument of Pope Adrian VI

Among the artistic treasures of the church are (in chronological order):

- An altarpiece painted by Giulio Romano in 1521-22 for a Fugger family, depicting the Sacred Family and donors (Mark and Giacomo Fugger).
- The funerary monument of Pope Adrian VI (r. 1521–1523), commissioned by his friend, cardinal Willem van Enckevoirt and designed in part by Baldassarre Peruzzi.
- An altarpiece (1532) by Lorenzetto.
- The funerary monument of Cardinal Willem van Enckevoirt (1464–1534), bishop of Tortosa (1522–1534) and of Utrecht (1529–1534). The monument by Giovanni Mangone was originally located next to Adrian's monument, but was moved to near the main entrance in 1575.
- A Deposition (1550) by Francesco Salviati
- A painting by Girolamo Siciolante da Sermoneta.
- The funerary of Andrew of Austria (1558–1600), cardinal since 1573
- Miracles of Saint Benno and Martyrdom of Saint Lambert (1618) painted by Carlo Saraceni.
- the Epitaph of Adriaen Vryburch (1629) by François Duquesnoy
- the Epitaph of Ferdinand van den Eynde (1633) by François Duquesnoy

An internal courtyard houses some ancient artifacts discovered in the church.

== See also ==
- Pontifical Teutonic Institute Santa Maria dell' Anima

== Sources ==
- Baumüller, Barbara (2000). Santa Maria dell'Anima in Rom: ein Kirchenbau im politischen Spannungsfeld der Zeit um 1500 (in German). Gebr. Mann. ISBN 978-3-7861-2308-8.
- Michaud, Cécile (2006). "Santa Maria dell'Anima". Johann Heinrich Schönfeld: un peintre allemand du XVIIe siècle en Italie (in French). Martin Meidenbauer Verlag. pp. 26–27. ISBN 978-3-89975-585-5.
- Clifford W Maas and Peter Herde, The German Community in Renaissance Rome, 1378-1523, Rome: Herder, 1981. ISBN 3-451-19149-0, ISBN 978-3-451-19149-7
- Ricarda Matheus, German-speaking pilgrims in Rome around the era of Goethe – Reconstruction and digital publication of an once forgotten historical source. Edited and published on behalf of the German Historical Institute in Rome in cooperation with the Pontificium Institutum Teutonicum Sanctae Mariae de Anima (Online publications of the history of Santa Maria dell’Anima 1; ed. by Michael Matheus/Johan Ickx). Rom n. d. (in German)
- Eberhard J. Nikitsch, Inscriptions of the “German national church” Santa Maria dell’Anima in Rome. Part 1: Middle Ages to 1559 (=DIO 3). Rome 2012. Published online in: inschriften.net respectively Deutsche Inschriften Online. (in German)
- Tamara Scheer, Negotiating National Character. The Habsburgs’ Roman Catholic Priest College Santa Maria dell’ Anima and the German National Church in Rome, 1859-1915, in: Austrian Studies 28 (2020), special issue "Fragments of Empire. Austrian Modernisms and the Habsburg Imaginary, edited by Deborah Holmes & Clemens Peck, 64-78.

This article contains public domain text from the article Schmidlin, J. (1913). "College and Church of the Anima (in Rome)" . In Herbermann, Charles (ed.). Catholic Encyclopedia. New York: Robert Appleton Company.
