= Tomb of Ferdinand van den Eynde =

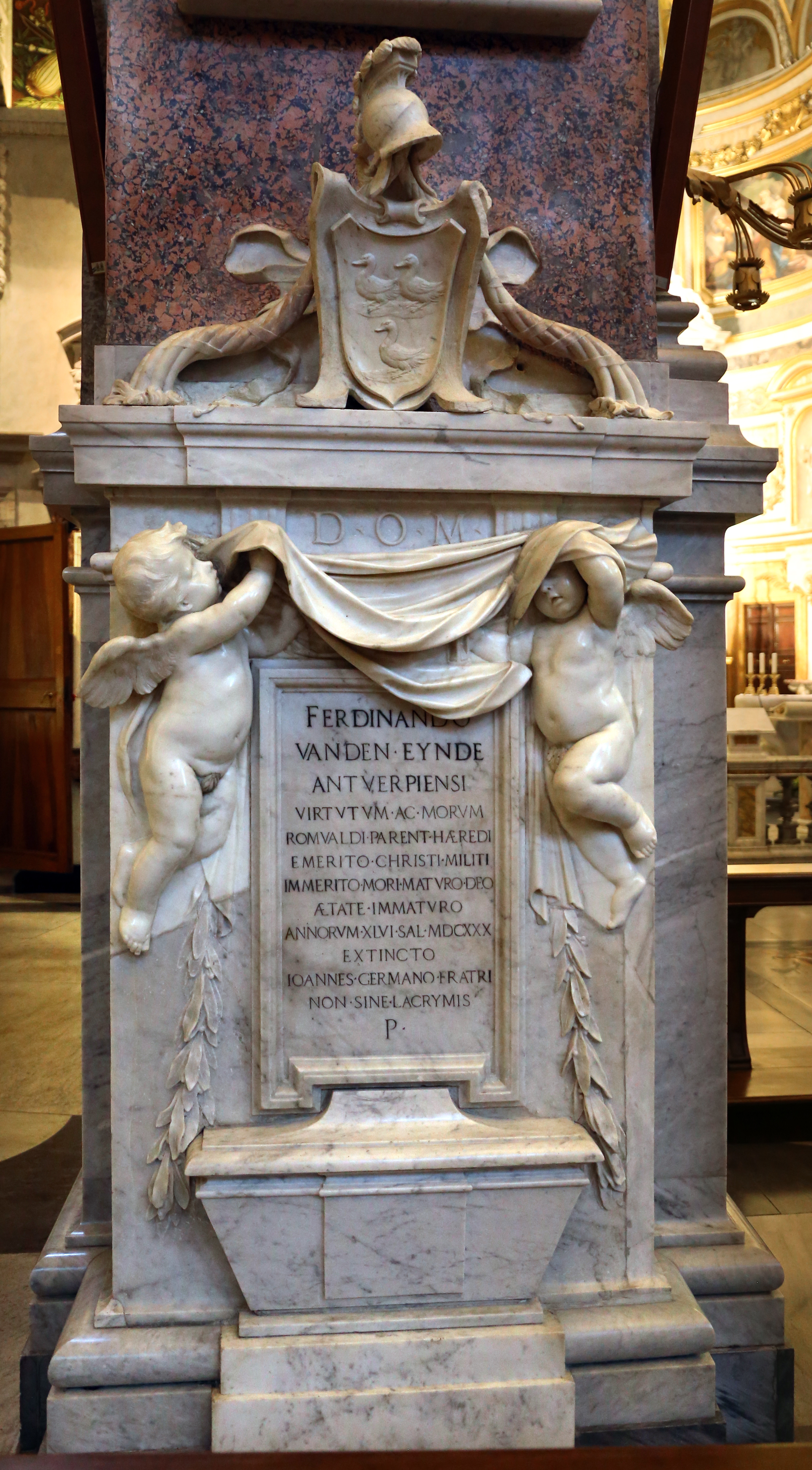
- Artist: François Duquesnoy
- Year: 1633–1640
- Type: Sculpture
- Medium: Marble
- Subject: Ferdinand van den Eynde
- Location: Santa Maria dell'Anima; Rome; 41°53′59.1″N 12°28′19.3″E

The Tomb of Ferdinand van den Eynde is a sculptural monument designed and executed by François Duquesnoy. It is located in the church of Santa Maria dell'Anima in Rome. Duquesnoy secured the commission for this work thanks to Pietro Pescatore, alias De Visschere, or Pieter Visscher, a Flemish merchant. The site for Eynde's epitaph was granted by the church administration on August 3, 1633. Visscher and Baldoin Breyel were charged with overseeing the tomb's execution. Both of them had been friends of the deceased, who belonged to the expatriate Netherlandish community of Santa Maria dell'Anima in Rome. The tomb was completed between 1633 and 1640.

The putti that compose Van den Eynde's epitaph, especially the righthand putto, are considered "the peak of the evolution of the putto in sculpture" and one of Duquesnoy's greatest achievements. Copies of the Van den Eynde's putti, whether in plaster or wax, were owned by many artists in Rome and Northern Europe. Plaster castings of the putti that decorate Van den Eynde's tomb were listed in the studio inventories of Bernini's assistant Peter Verpoorten and the Italian artist Ercole Ferrata in Rome, as well as in the Antwerp studios of Erasmus Quellinus II and Peter Paul Rubens. Both Giovanni Battista Passeri and Giovanni Pietro Bellori stressed the fame of the Van den Eynde's putti, which served as models of the infant putto for contemporary artists. Many other artists, such as Peter Paul Rubens and Johann Joachim Winckelmann (generally a harsh critic of Baroque sculpture) lauded Van den Eynde's putti. Throughout the following centuries, artists from around the world portrayed the Van den Eynde's epitaph in painting and drawing. Among the drawings which survive today, there are those of Johan Sylvius, Jean-Robert Ango, and Augustin Pajou.

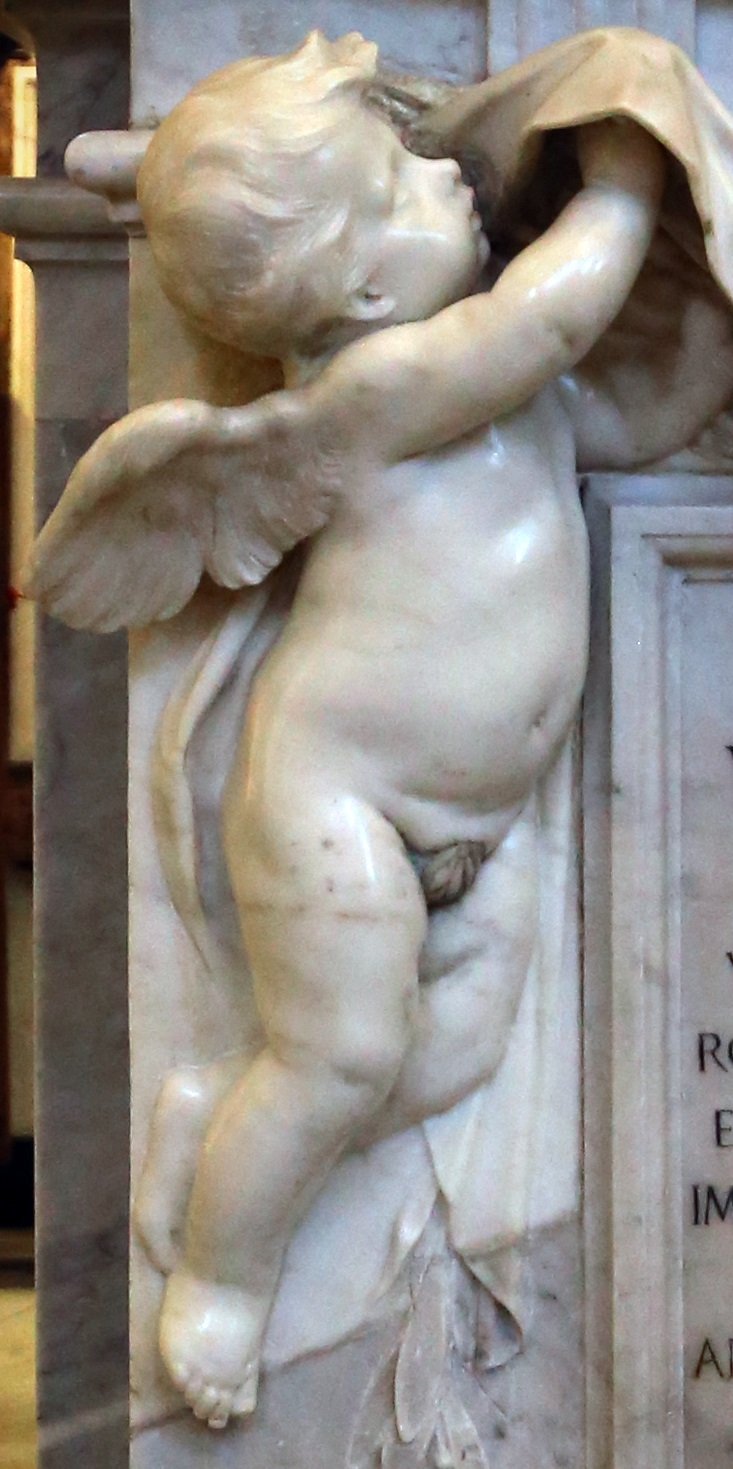
Detail of lefthand putto

== Background ==
The church administration granted the site for Eynde's epitaph on August 3, 1633, with Duquesnoy presumably receiving the commission at this time. In his biography of the Fiammingo, Joachim von Sandrart excused himself from describing the Van den Eynde's tomb, as it was realized after his departure from Rome. Sandrart departed from Rome in 1635.

The site for Van den Eynde's epitaph was on the pier directly opposite the tomb of Adriaan Vrijburgh, with the two tombs built up against columns on either side. Vrijburgh was another young Dutch nobleman whose funerary monument was likewise commissioned from Duquesnoy.

Duquesnoy had Pietro Pescatore, alias De Visschere, or Pieter Visscher, a rich Flemish merchant, to thank for the commissions for the funerary monuments of both Van den Eynde and Vrijburgh. De Visschere, an art enthusiast, served in the administration of Santa Maria dell’Anima, and was indeed involved in overseeing Duquesnoy's commission for the tomb of Van den Eynde.

== Subject ==
The funerary monument is an epitaph, or cenotaph, to Ferdinand van den Eynde, a Netherlandish merchant and art collector from Antwerp, who was a member of the Netherlandish colony in Rome. Ferdinand was brother to Jan van den Eynde, a Flemish merchant established in Naples, one of the richest men in the city, and its most prominent art collector. His son, Marquis Ferdinand van den Eynde, became an art collector as well. Ferdinand van den Eynde died prematurely in 1630.

== Style and composition ==
The viewer is firstly attracted by the mastery of the artist, the naturalism of the putti, the milky flesh of the infants (with the marble that, according to Rubens, was "softened into living flesh"), and thence led to contemplate their actions.

As observed by Bellori:

one of them wraps part of his head in the cloth as a sign of sadness and holds in his hand the hourglass of death. This certainly is the most beautiful little putto that Franscesco's chisel animated

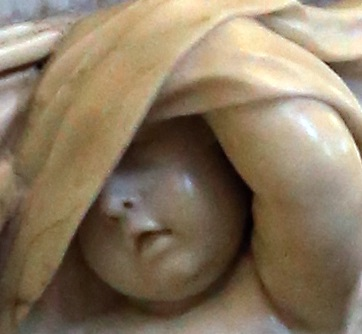
Detail of right-hand putto

Bellori also stressed the act of mourning of the righthand putto, evident in both his expression and the gesture of covering his face with the drape. Yet, at the same time, with his hourglass in hand and his eyes covered, "the putto becomes an infant personification of blind death."

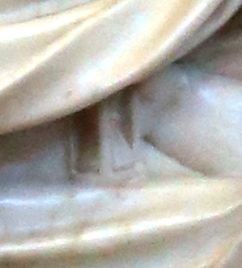
Detail of hourglass

In addition, as noted by Estelle Lingo, "because the infant's posture can be understood as the result of his struggle to lift the drape from the tomb, the figure seems to play upon the theoretical criticism that the infant's youth made him unfit for his 'monumental' task."

The putto on the left, on the other hand, appears fully absorbed in raising his side of the cloth: "only after long contemplation the viewer may notice that this infant, too, carries an attribute, the long trumpet of fame. Grasped in his left hand, the instrument is almost entirely covered by the cloth, though the outline of its flared end may be discerned beneath the drape when one looks for it. The use of an attribute so well hidden is surprising, but serves to underscore Duquesnoy's conception of the tomb as a site of meditation, an epigrammatic construction in which a few forms sustain a range of meanings. The monument's literally and figuratively veiled allusions are discovered by the viewer as they respond to the monument, thus completing its meaning. Only when the veil is lifted, and the inscription read, will Eynden's fame be assured."

== Reception and esteem ==
Giovanni Battista Passeri and Giovanni Pietro Bellori praised Duqesnoy's work, and stressed the fame of the Van den Eynde's putti. They enjoyed huge fame in the following centuries, and served as models of the infant putto for contemporary artists. Bellori wrote:

The Greeks were excellent at sculpting and painting the Erotes and the Genii as young boys, and it seems that Callistratus gives a very good description of the putti around the statue of the Nile, and Philostratos does so in his account of the Erotes at play. Michelangelo made putti in both marble and paint, all of them resembling figures of Hercules, devoid of tenderness. Raphael is the first to give them grace and charm: he depicts them in a lively manner, growing in beauty in proportion to their age. Titian and Correggio depicted them more tenderly. Annibale Carracci belonged to that group, and Domenichino is considered excellent. He used them more than any other artist in composition, and shows them in different guises: as babes in swaddling clothes and as adults, with the movements and quality corresponding to the age of each. Francesco the Fleming limited himself more to the tender forms of little children, and in creating this likeness he miraculously advanced the manner, which is now imitated by everyone

and

In Rome, in the church of Santa Maria dell'Anima, he made two tombs which are built up against columns on either side. The one is Ferdinand of van den Eynde's, a gentleman from Antwerp, and the other of Adriaen of the Vrijburgh family of Alkmaar. On the first are two putti which raise a cloth to reveal the inscription. One of them covers part of its head with a cloth as token of sorrow, and it holds the hourglass of death in its hand. This is without doubt the most beautiful little putto to which Francesco's chisel gave life, and sculptors and painters consider it exemplary, together with its companion, who is turned towards him and bows with him as he raises the cloth

Rubens, whose putti may be considered the "painterly pendant" to Duquesnoy's, praised the Van den Eynde putti greatly. In a letter to Duquesnoy, in which he thanks the Fiammingo for the models after the putti of Van den Eynde's epitaph, he writes:

I do not know hot to express to you my obligation for the models you have sent me, and for the plaster casts of the two putti for the epitaph of van den Eynde in the Chiesa dell'Anima. Still less can I praise their beauty properly. It is nature, rather than art, that has formed them; the marble is softened into living flesh

Even Johann Joachim Winckelmann, who generally was a critic of the Baroque, commented:

Our artists resemble the classical sculptors in the sense that they too do not know how to make beautiful children, and I believe that they prefer to choose a Cupid by Fiammingo [Duquesnoy] to imitate than on by Praxiteles himself. The well-known story about a Cupid that Michelangelo made and then placed alongside one by an old master, in order to teach our generation how excellent the art of the ancients was, proves nothing here, for Michelangelo's children will never move us as deeply as nature itself does. I do not believe that I am overstepping the mark when I say that Fiammingo acted like a new Prometheus, by modelling creaturres that were rarely seen

Many notable artists visited Van den Eynde's tomb in Rome to reproduce his epitaph in drawing and painting. Among the drawings which survived to this day, there are those of Johan Sylvius, Jean-Robert Ango and Augustin Pajou.

== Sources ==
- Boudon-Machuel, Marion (2005). François Du Quesnoy. Paris, France: Arthena.
- "Epitaph of Ferdinand van den Eynde". Web Gallery of Art.
- Lingo, Estelle Cecile (2007). François Duquesnoy and the Greek Ideal. New Haven, Connecticut: Yale University Press. ISBN 9780300124835.
- Cooke, Brett (1999). Sociobiology and the Arts. Editions Rodopi. ISBN 9789042005846.
- G.Porzio, G.J. van der Sman (2018). 'La quadreria Vandeneynden'; 'La collezione di un principe'. A. Denunzio.
- Ruotolo, Renato (1982). Mercanti-collezionisti fiamminghi a Napoli: Gaspare Roomer e i Vandeneynden. Massa Lubrense Napoli - Scarpati.
- Yeager-Crasselt, Lara Rebecca (2007). "MICHAEL SWEERTS" (PDF). College Park, Maryland: University of Maryland.
