= German Historical Institute in Rome =

Rome-based German research institute

Coordinates: 41.8912°N 12.4278°E

- Deutsches Historisches Institut in Rom
- Type: German humanities institute abroad
- Established: 1888
- Director: Petra Terhoeven
- Location: Rome, Lazio, Italy
- Website: http://www.dhi-roma.it/

The German Historical Institute in Rome, short DHI Rome, is the oldest of the German historical institutes abroad. Its purpose is to conduct research of the Italian history and music history, as well as the history of German-Italian relations from the early Middle Ages to the present day. Central is an interdisciplinary and transepochal perspective and a particular focus on transregional and transnational contexts in southern Europe and the Mediterranean area.

== Institute ==
The "Deutsche Historische Institut in Rom", short DHI Rome, was founded as "Prussian Historical Station" in 1888 after the opening of the Vatican Secret Archives. It conducts historical basic research, promotes young academics and is a services facility. As such, the DHI Rome supports German scientists and institutions in their relevant research and promotes the cooperation of German, Italian and international historians.

In 1960 a Department of Music History was created at the institute, working on the musical cultures of Germany and Italy as well as their relationships in the music history of Europe.

Traditionally, guests, scholarship recipients and research fellows of the German Historical Institute in Rome work in the Vatican Secret Archives and the Vatican Library. Since the 1960s, they focus increasingly on further church and state archives and libraries situated in Rome. The director sides with an Academic Advisory Board.

The DHI Rome was included in the Max Weber Stiftung – Deutsche Geisteswissenschaftliche Institute im Ausland (Max Weber Foundation – German Humanities Institutes Abroad) (founded in 2002 in Bonn), together with further humanities institutes of the Federal Republic of Germany.

== Projects ==
The Institute frequently organizes scientific conferences, colloquials and presentations on topics of Italian history and music history as well as the German-Italian relations from the early Middle Ages to the present day. It issues several scholarships annually for young Ph.D. and post-doc scholars in the fields of history and music history. The Ludwig and Margarethe Quidde Fellowship supports young postdoc researchers who are distinguished by outstanding academic achievements in the field of history or musicology. Several internships of six weeks each are directed at students of history or music history, who focus on German-Italian relations or Italian (music) history. A course of Roman studies in autumn grants students insights in local history and monuments.

== Publications ==
The DHI Rome issues several editions since 1892, reflecting the institute's spectrum of research. They include:

=== Editions und regesta ===
Repertorium Germanicum

The Repertorium Germanicum is a collection of regesta, gathering all "German" topics in the Vatican registers and cameral stock from the Great Schism to the reformation (1378–1517) since 1897.

Repertorium Poenitentiariae Germanicum

In addition to the Repertorium Germanicum, the RPG (issued since 1998) offers a fundamental source edition for German history of the late Middle Ages.

Nuntiaturberichte aus Deutschland

Since 1892, a collection of historical sources concerning the Papal diplomacy of the 16th and 17th centuries.

Instructiones Pontificum Romanorum

This is a source collection of the instructions for the papal nuncios and delegates at European courts, issued since 1984.

Concentus musicus

A gathering of musical monuments selected and edited by the Department of Music History since 1973. It focuses on renowned Italian music from the times between 1600 and 1900.

=== Monographs and anthologies ===
Bibliothek des Deutschen Historischen Instituts in Rom

Since 1905, this series publishes scientific monographs and anthologies on Italian and German history from the early Middle Ages to modern times.

Ricerche dell’Istituto Storico Germanico di Roma

In order to make the institute's research proceedings known among Italian academics, a series for editions and srtudies in Italian language was founded in 2005.

Analecta musicologia

This series of editions published by the Music History Department includes anthologies, conference acts of events at the DHI Rome, and monographs since 1963.

=== Journals ===
Quellen und Forschungen aus italienischen Archiven und Bibliotheken

Since 1898, the institute's journal deals with the relations between Germany and Italy and other topics of Italian history from the early Middle Ages to contemporary history. It includes the director's annual report, conference acts and reports of events at the institute and a large review section.

Bibliographische Informationen zur neuesten Geschichte Italiens

Published in cooperation with the Arbeitsgemeinschaft für die neueste Geschichte Italiens three time a year since 1974, this journal has introduced over 60.000 scientific publications in the humanities.

== Libraries and Archive ==
The DHI Rome has both a History Library and a Music History Library. The first specializes in Italian and German history as well as the binational relations, including approximately 171,000 volumes and 667 current journals. The Music History Library has 57,000 media units, including monographs, music and sound carriers, and 440 journals. It comprises a collection of 1,500 rare Librettos (numbers as of 2012). The library catalogues are also available online. The archive secures all writings of the institute and its precedent institutions from 1888 to today.

== Directors ==
- 1888–1890: Konrad Schottmüller
- 1890–1892: Ludwig Quidde
- 1892–1901: Walter Friedensburg
- 1901–1903: Aloys Schulte
- 1903–1936: Paul Fridolin Kehr
- 1936–1937: Wilhelm Engel
- 1937–1942: Edmund E. Stengel
- 1942–1945: Theodor Mayer
- 1953–1961: Walther Holtzmann
- 1962–1972: Gerd Tellenbach
- 1972–1988: Reinhard Elze
- 1988–2001: Arnold Esch
- 2001-2002: Alexander Koller (acting director)
- 2002-2012: Michael Matheus
- 2012-2024: Martin Baumeister
- since 2024: Petra Terhoeven

== Literature ==
- Lothar Burchardt: Das Deutsche Historische Institut in Rom. In: Geschichte und Gesellschaft Vol. 12 1986 pp. 420–422.
- Reinhard Elze, Arnold Esch (eds.): Das Deutsche Historische Institut in Rom 1888–1988. Tübingen 1990 (= Bibliothek des Deutschen Historischen Instituts in Rom, Vol. 70), ISBN 3-484-82070-5.
- Arnold Esch: Die Gründung deutscher Institute in Italien 1870–1914. Ansätze zu einer Institutionalisierung geisteswissenschaftlicher Forschung im Ausland. In: Jahrbuch der Akademie der Wissenschaften in Göttingen 1997, pp. 159–188.
- Arnold Esch: Die Lage der deutschen wissenschaftlichen Institute nach dem Ersten Weltkrieg und die Kontroverse über ihre Organisation. Kehrs „Römische Mission" 1919/1920. In: Quellen und Forschungen aus italienischen Archiven und Bibliotheken 72 (1992), pp. 314–373.
- Arnold Esch: L’Istituto Storico Germanico e le ricerche sull’età sueva in Italia. In: Bulletin dell’Istituto storico italiano per il medio evo 96 (1990), pp. 11–17.
- Michael Matheus, Die Wiedereröffnung des Deutschen Historischen Instituts 1953 in Rom. Transalpine Akteure zwischen Unione und Nation, in: Die Rückkehr der deutschen Geschichtswissenschaft in die "Ökumene der Historiker". Ein wissenschaftsgeschichtlicher Ansatz, Ulrich Pfeil (ed.), Munich 2008, pp. 91–113.
- Michael Matheus (ed.): Deutsche Forschungs- und Kulturinstitute in Rom in der Nachkriegszeit. Tübingen 2007 (= Bibliothek des Deutschen Historischen Instituts in Rom, Vol. 112), ISBN 978-3-484-82112-5.
- Michèle Schubert: Auseinandersetzung über Aufgaben und Gestalt des Preußischen historischen Instituts in den Jahren 1900–1903. In: Quellen und Forschungen aus italienischen Archiven und Bibliotheken 76 (1996), pp. 383–454.
