= List of villas in Naples =

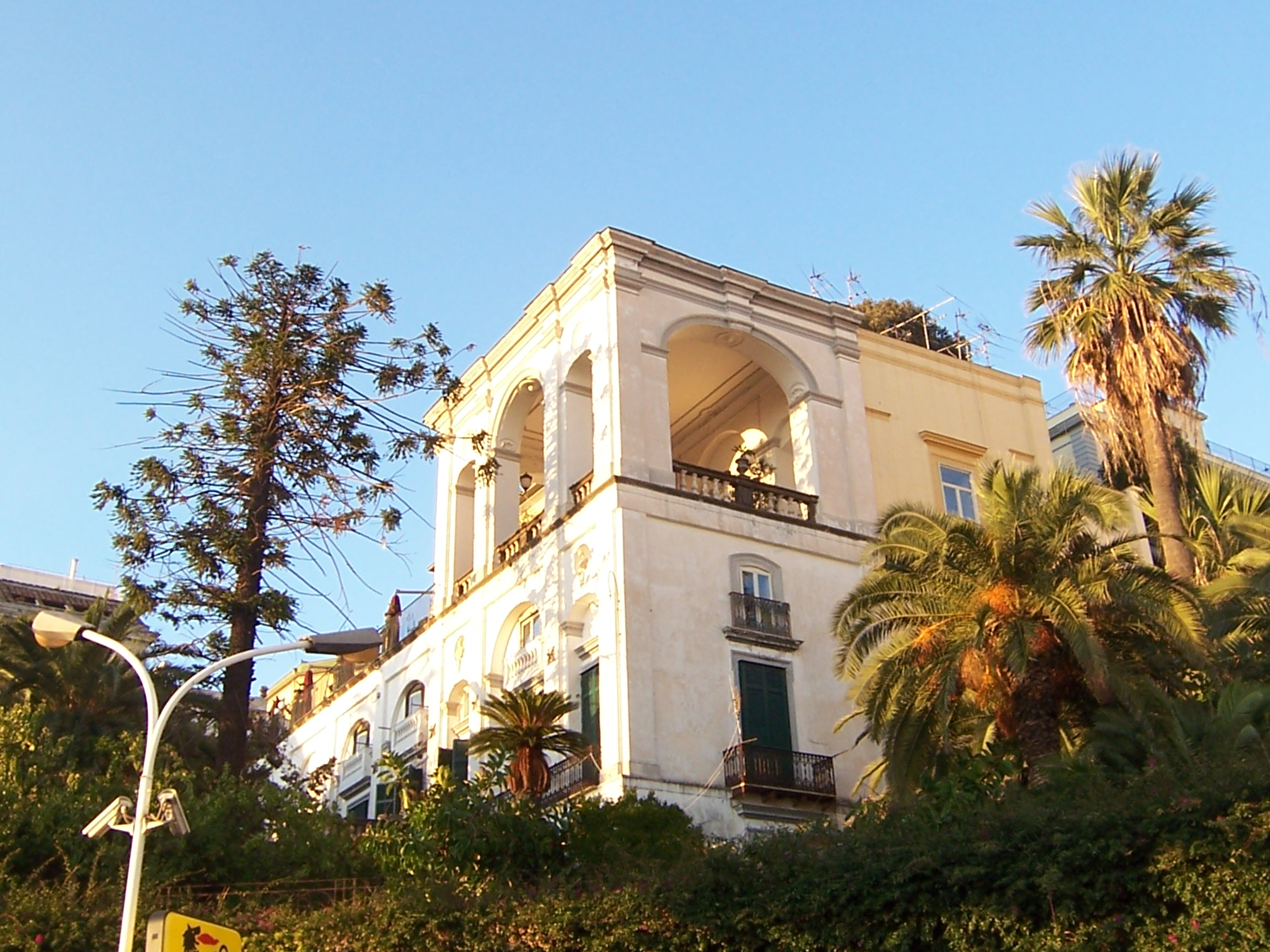
Villa Carafa of Belvedere

There are many hundreds of villas in the Italian city of Naples. The landscapes of the Gulf of Naples have always encouraged this type of structure. Among them are the Villa Donn'Anna, built in the early 15th century and rebuilt in the 1640s, and the Villa Rosebery, which is one of the official residences of the President of Italy and is named after the 5th Earl of Rosebery, the former British Prime Minister who bought it in 1897.

== Roman origins ==
The Gulf of Naples was a particular locus of the development of Roman villas from roughly 50 BCE to 200 CE, where they were built as retreats and status symbols by senators and the like. Of the many villas of this era discovered in Boscoreale, Naples, buried in the eruption of Mount Vesuvius that also buried Pompeii, one now visible is the Villa Regina. That was a villa rustica – a rustic villa, as distinguished from a villa urbana, which would have been grander. The work of John D'Arms and particularly his book Romans on the Bay of Naples have been important in understanding the history and nature of the Roman Villa. In the Gulf of Naples, well-preserved examples include the Villa of the Papyri, Villa Poppaea, and, at Stabiae, Villa Arianna A and B and Villa San Marco.

== Examples ==
- Villa Carafa of Belvedere
- Villa Castagneto-Caracciolo
- Villa Craven (Villa Rae)
- Villa Donn'Anna (originally La Villa Sirena)
- Villa Doria d'Angri
- Villa Ebe
- Villa Floridiana
- Villa Giulia
- Villa La Duchesca
- Villa Lucia
- Villa Majo
- Villa Mazziotti
- Villa Patrizi
- Villa Pignatelli
- Poggio Reale (villa)
- Villa Regina, Boscoreale
- Villa Ricciardi
- Villa Rocca Matilde
- Villa Roccaromana
- Villa Rosebery
- Villa Volpicelli

== Gallery ==
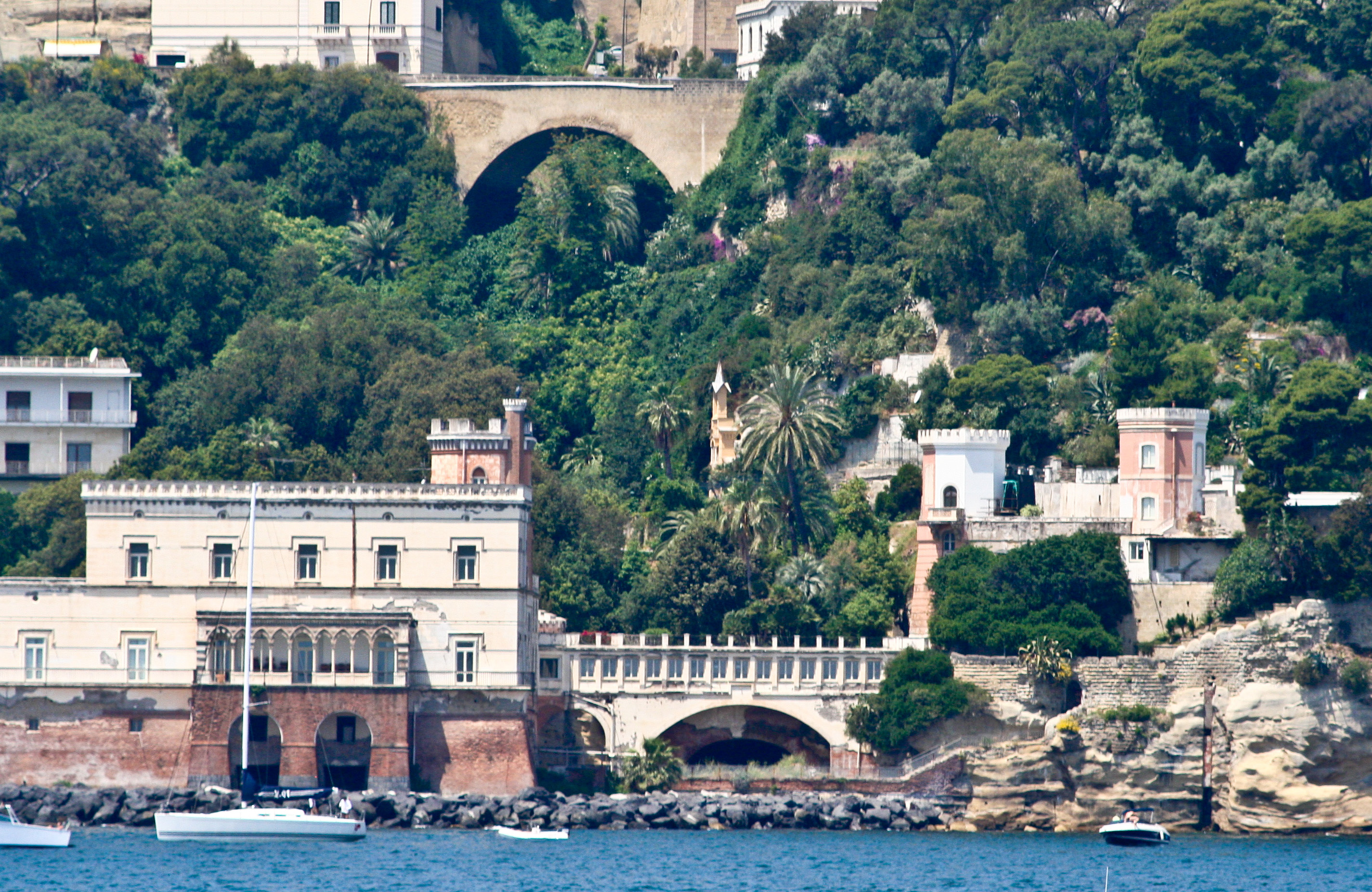
Villa Rocca Matilde

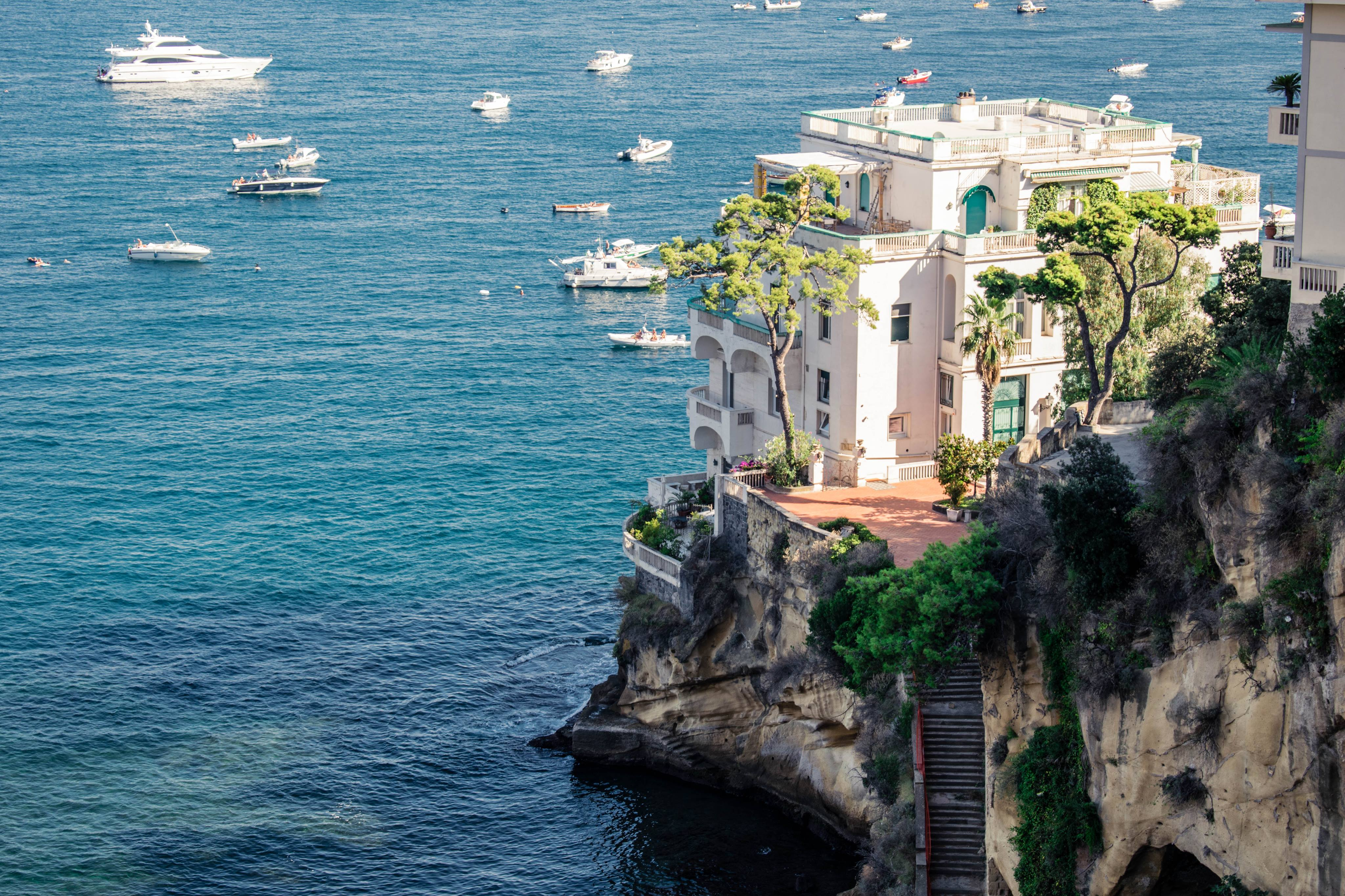
Villa Elisa, 45 Posillipo street

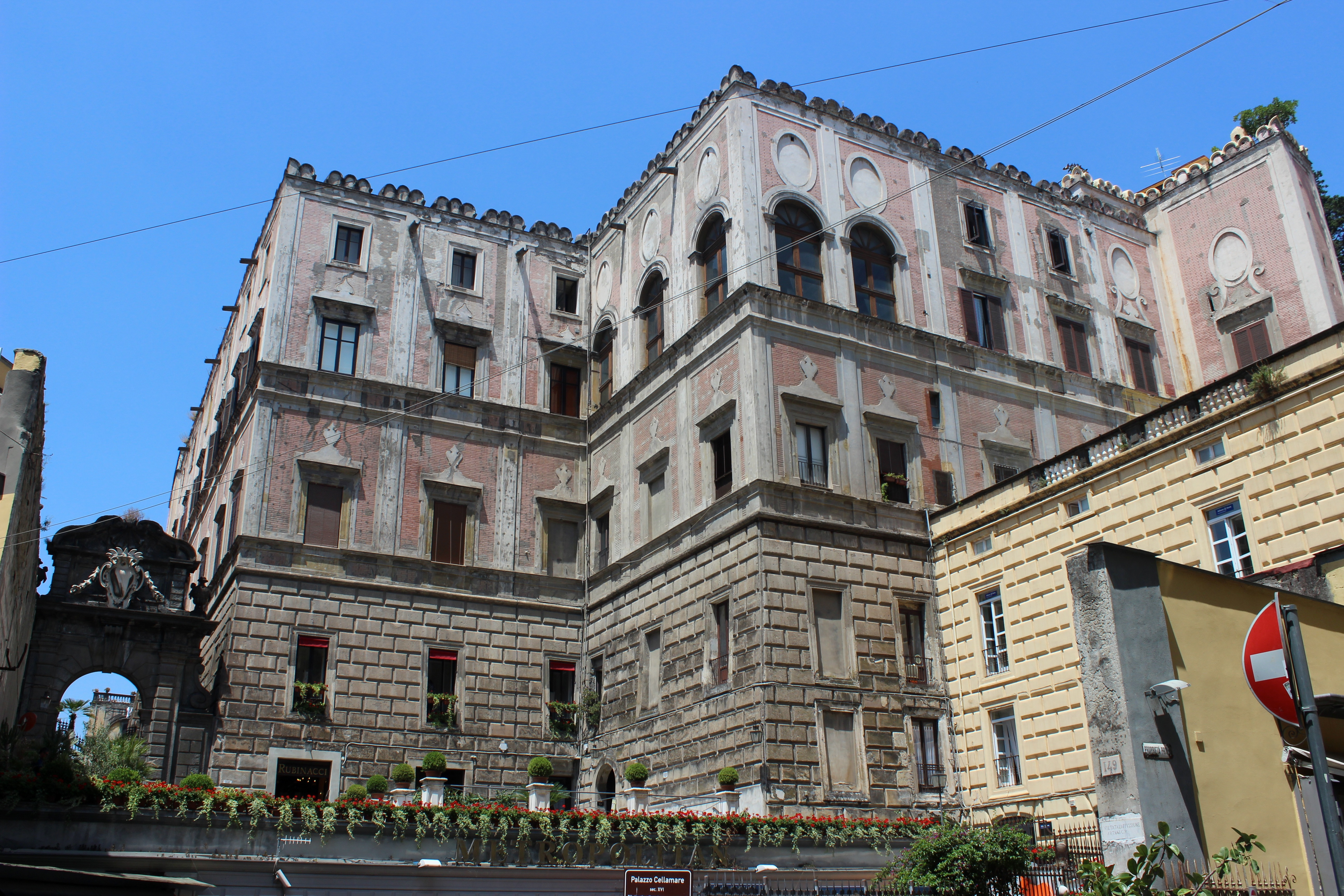
Villa Cellammare

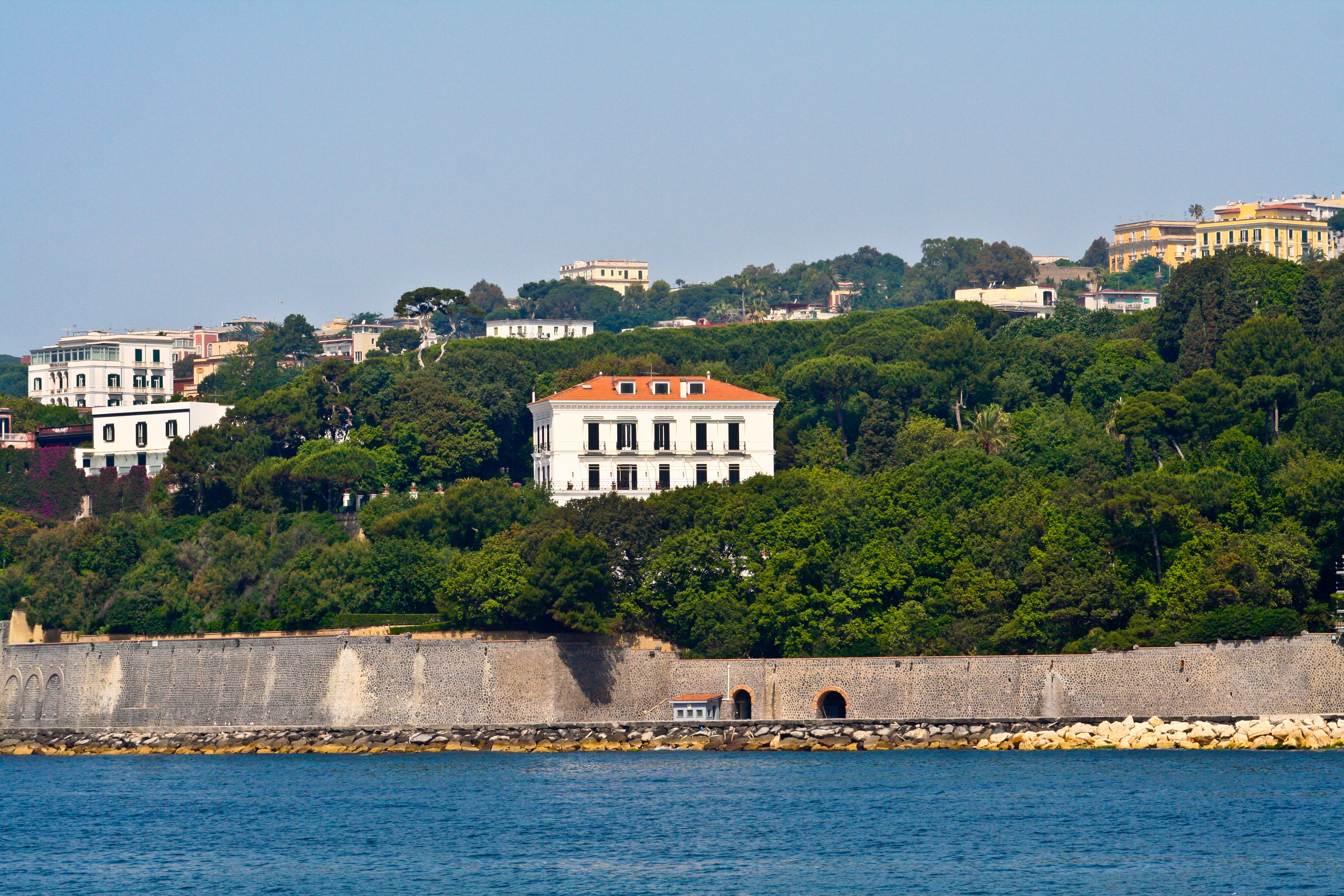
Villa Rosebery

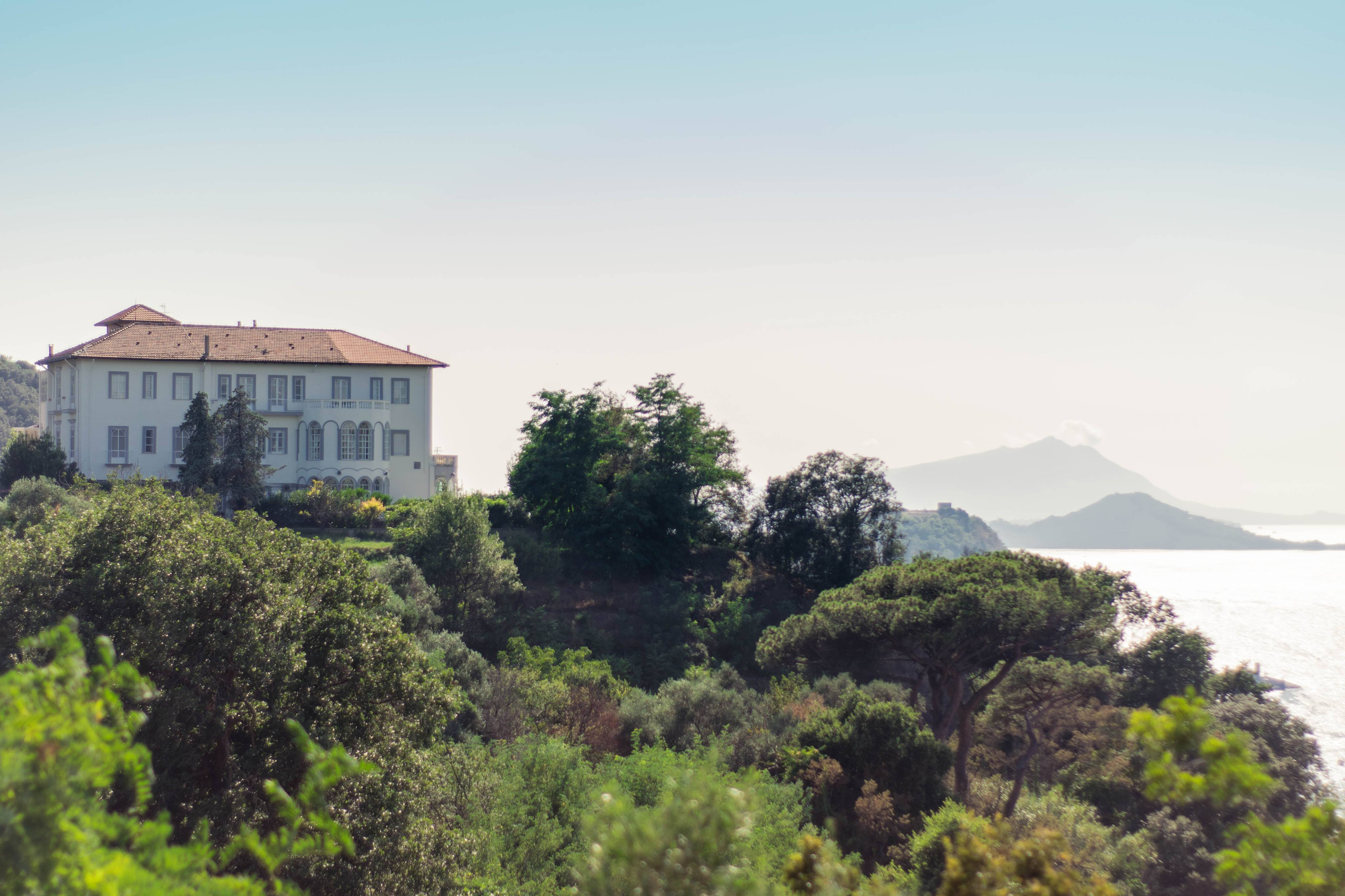
Villa, n.14 Virgilio street

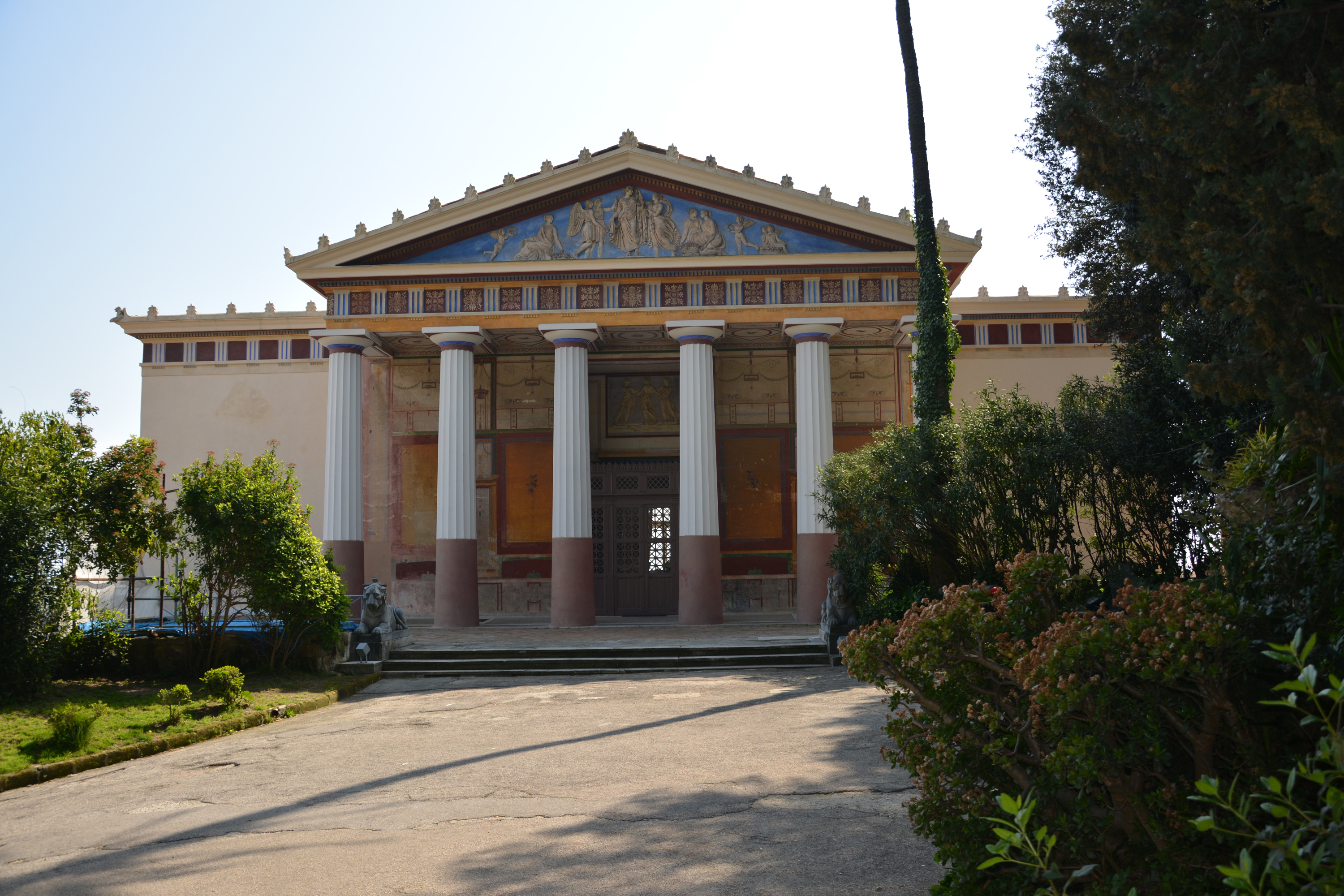
Villa Lucia

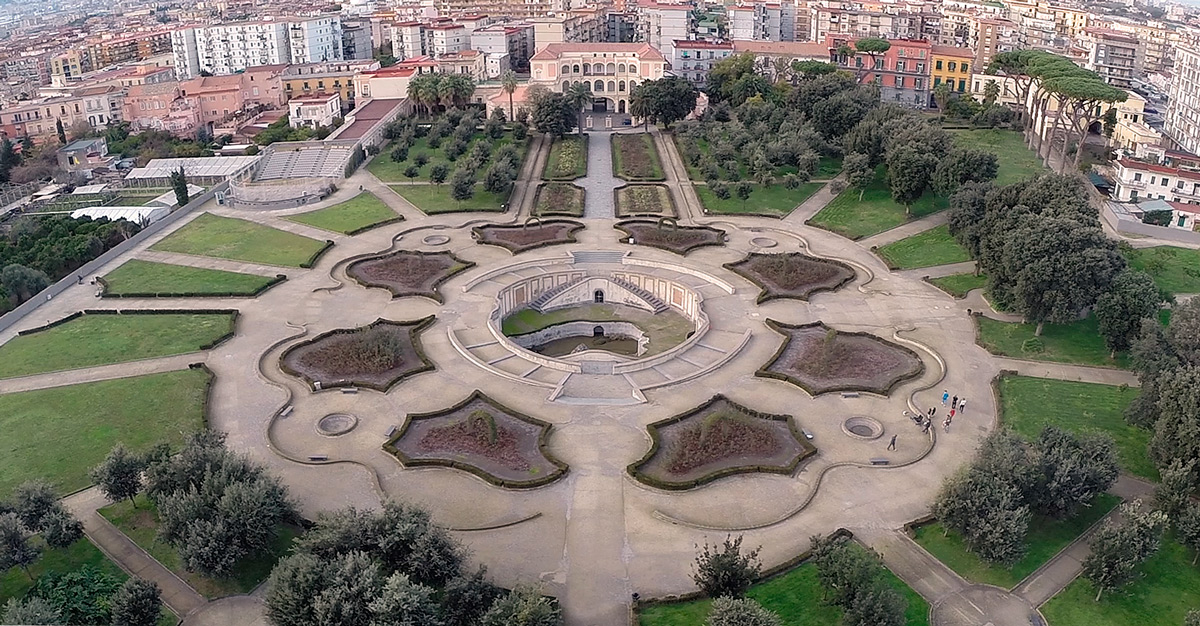
The gardens of Villa Vannucchi

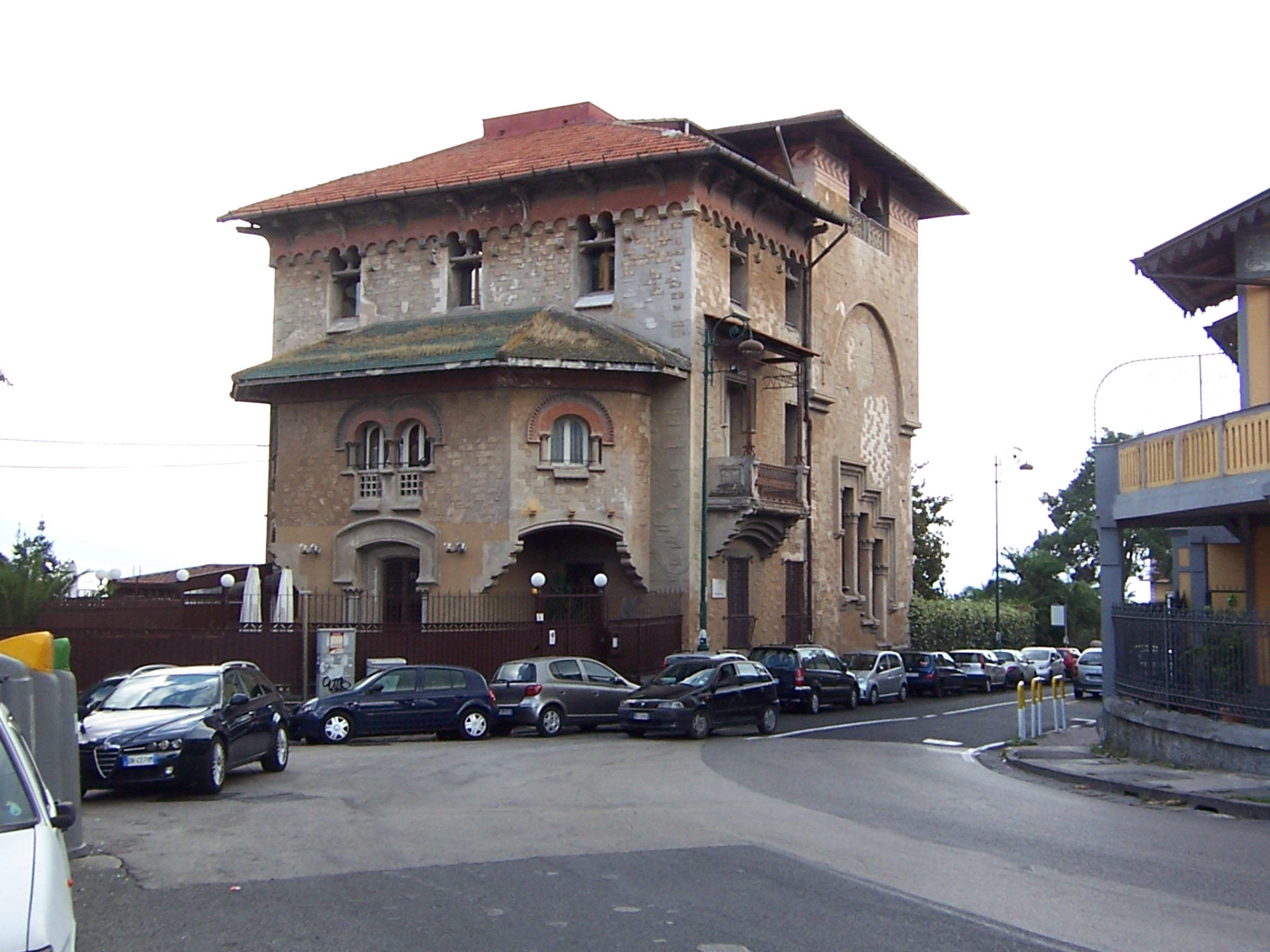
Villa Spera

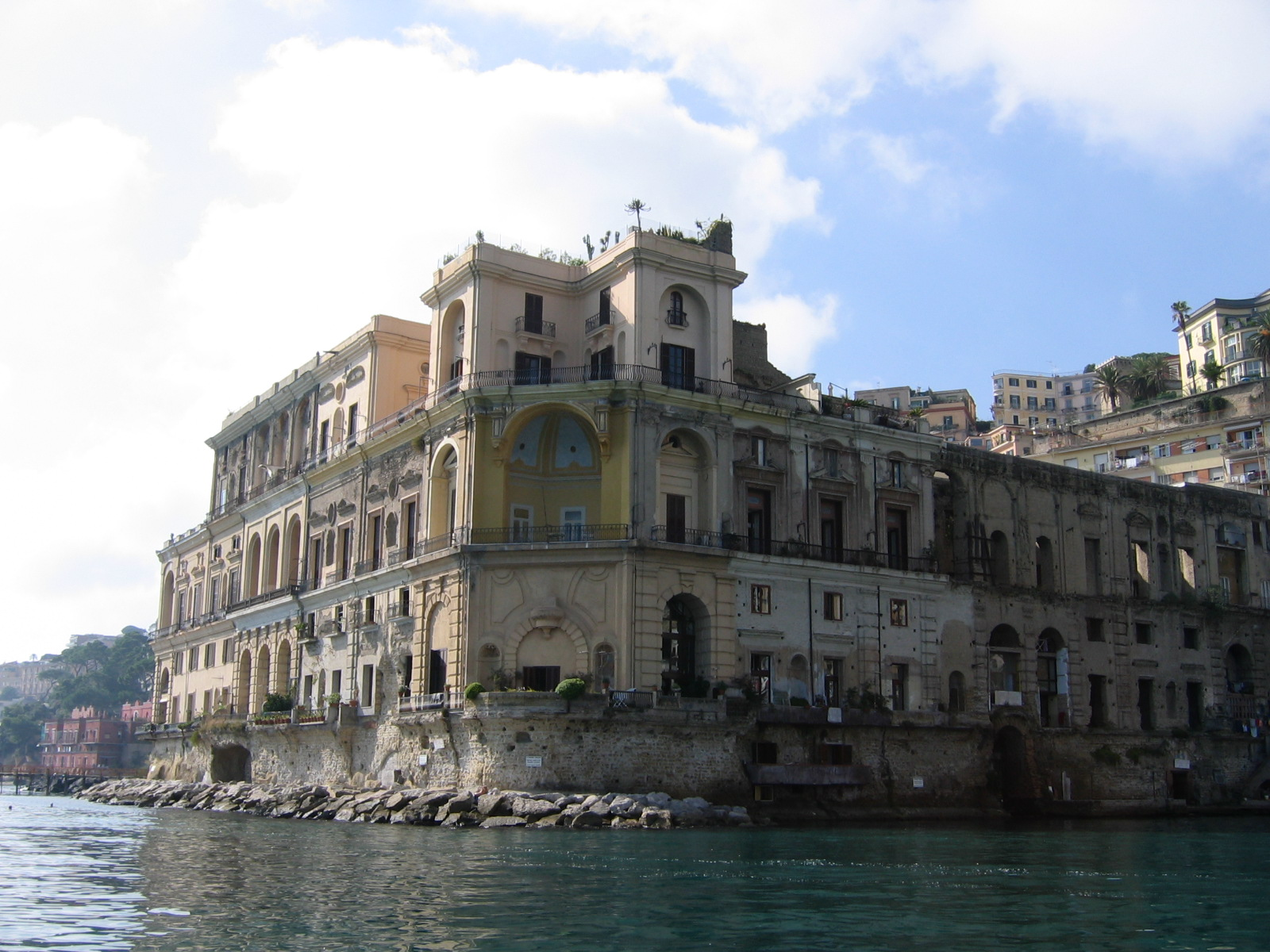
Villa Donn'Anna

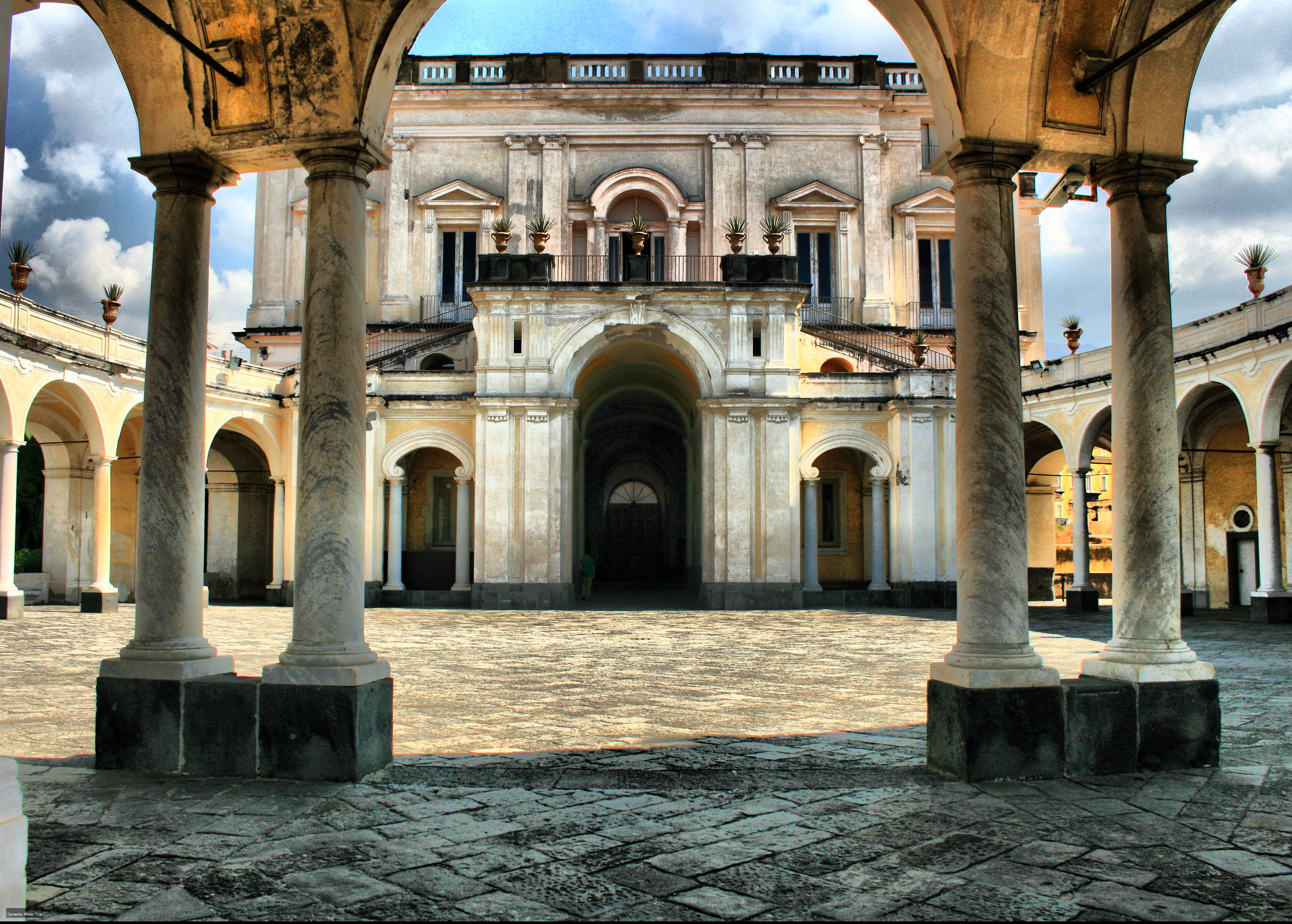
Villa Campolieto

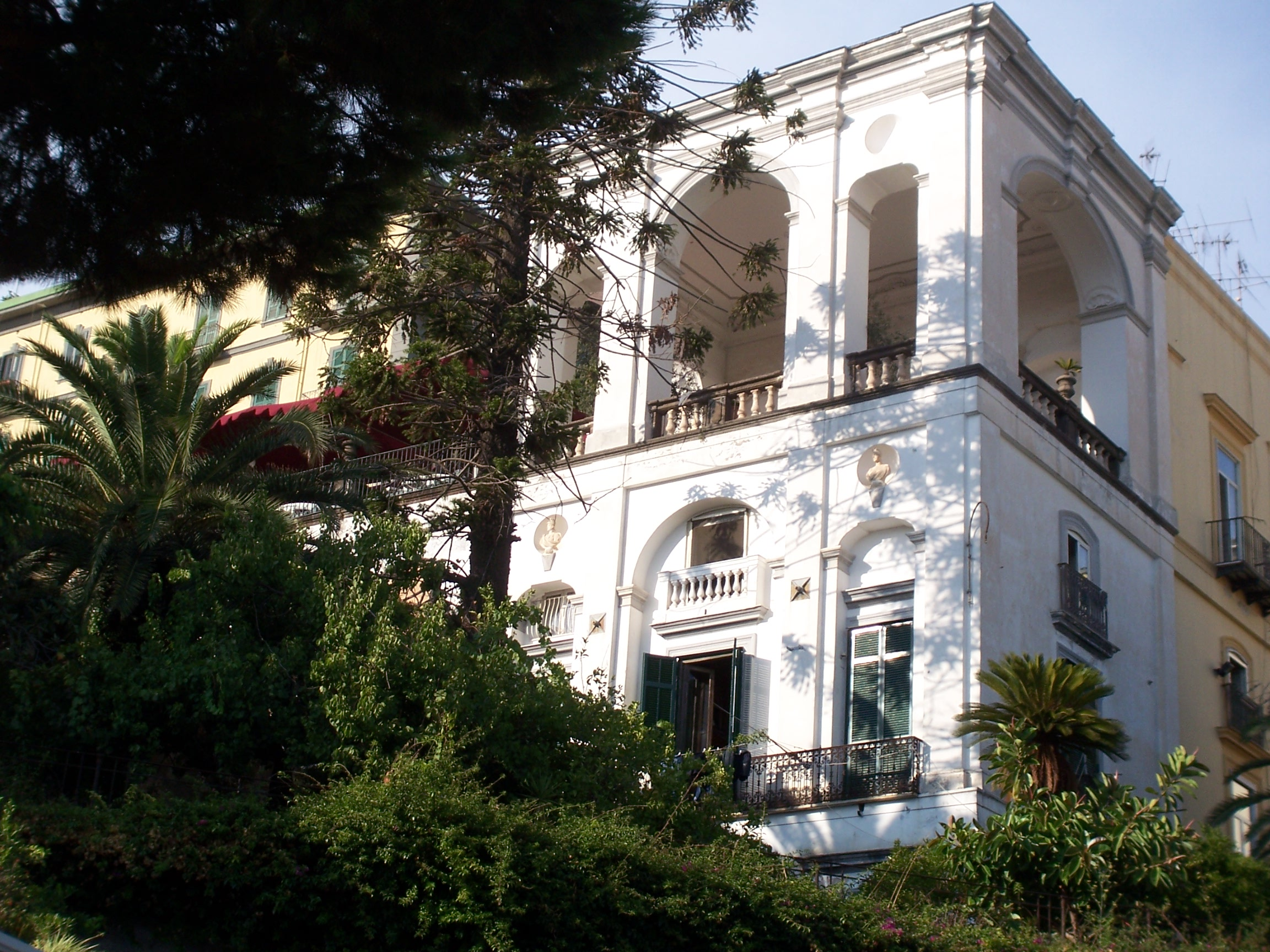
Villa Carafa of Belvedere

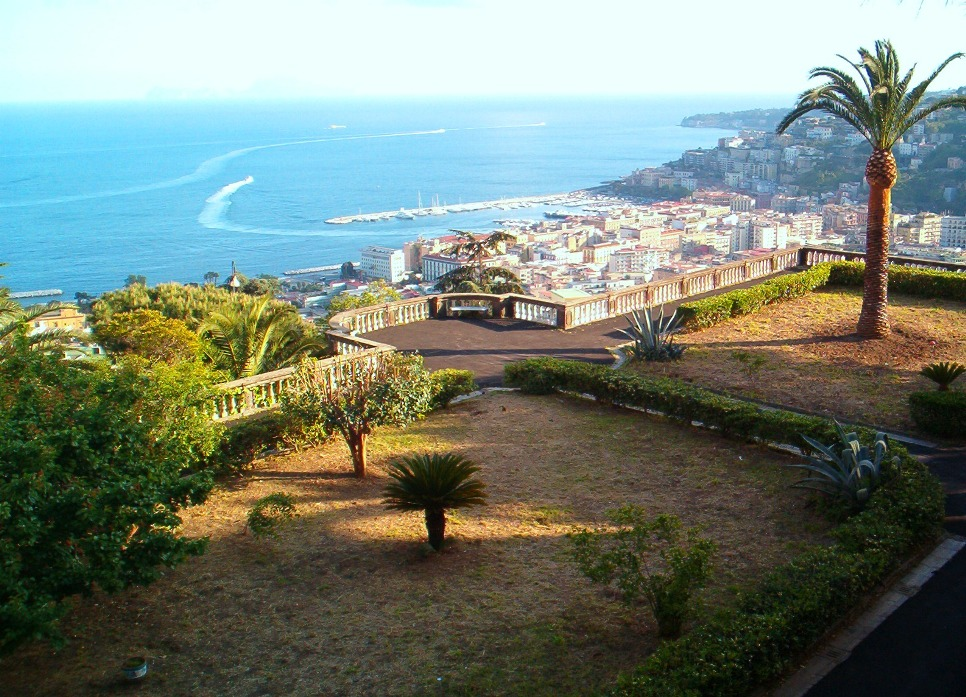
View from Villa Carafa

== See also ==
- Category:Palaces in Naples
