= Villa Castagneto-Caracciolo =

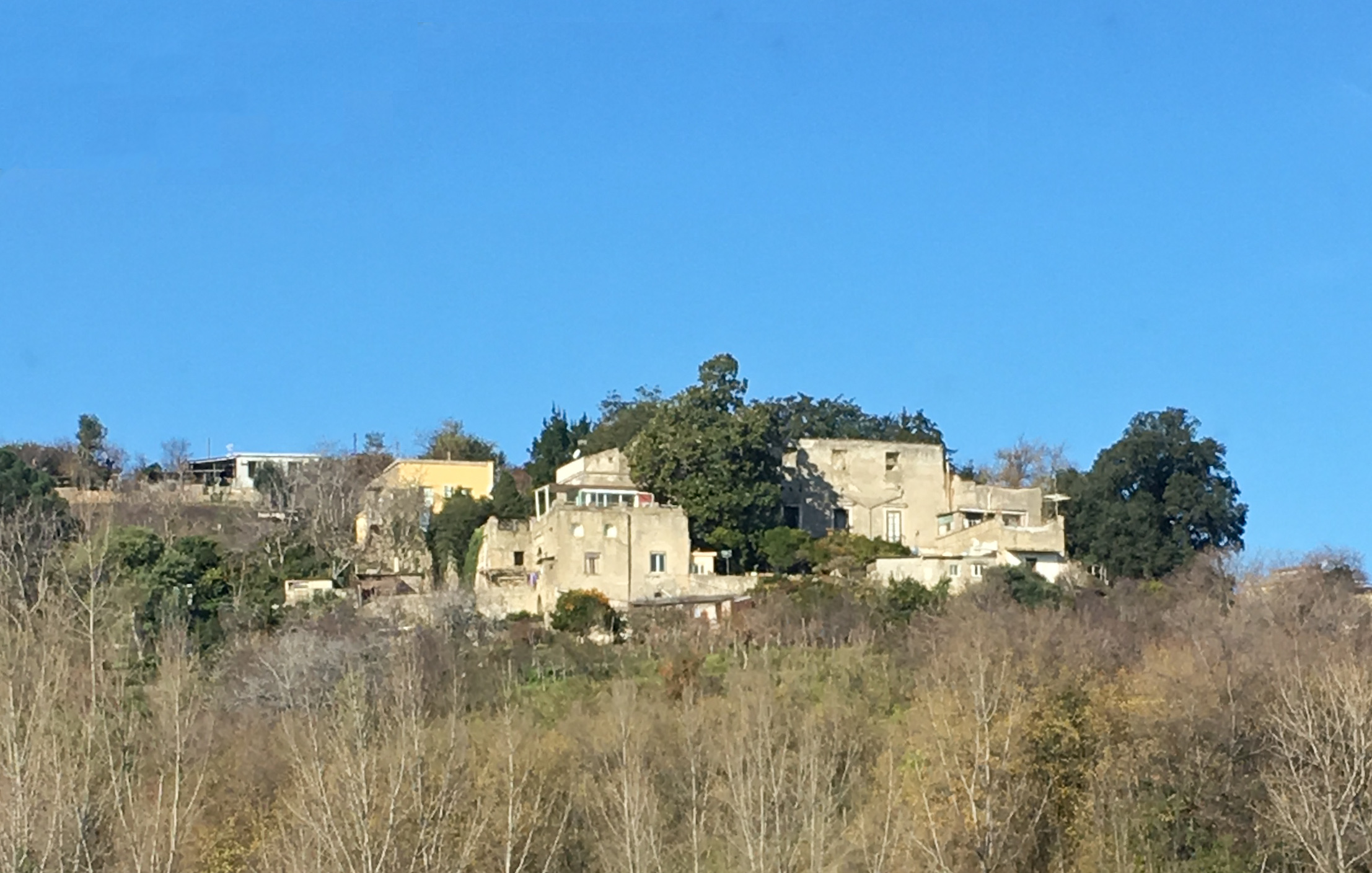
- Interactive map of Villa Castagneto-Caracciolo
- Location: Naples, Campania, Italy

Villa Castagneto-Caracciolo (formerly Villa Regina Madre) is a historical structure in Naples, Italy. It is located on the top of the Scudillo hill, between the hills of Colli Aminei, Capodimonte and Vomero.

It appears in the eighteenth century map of the Duke of Noja, where it is represented as an open courtyard "villa casino."

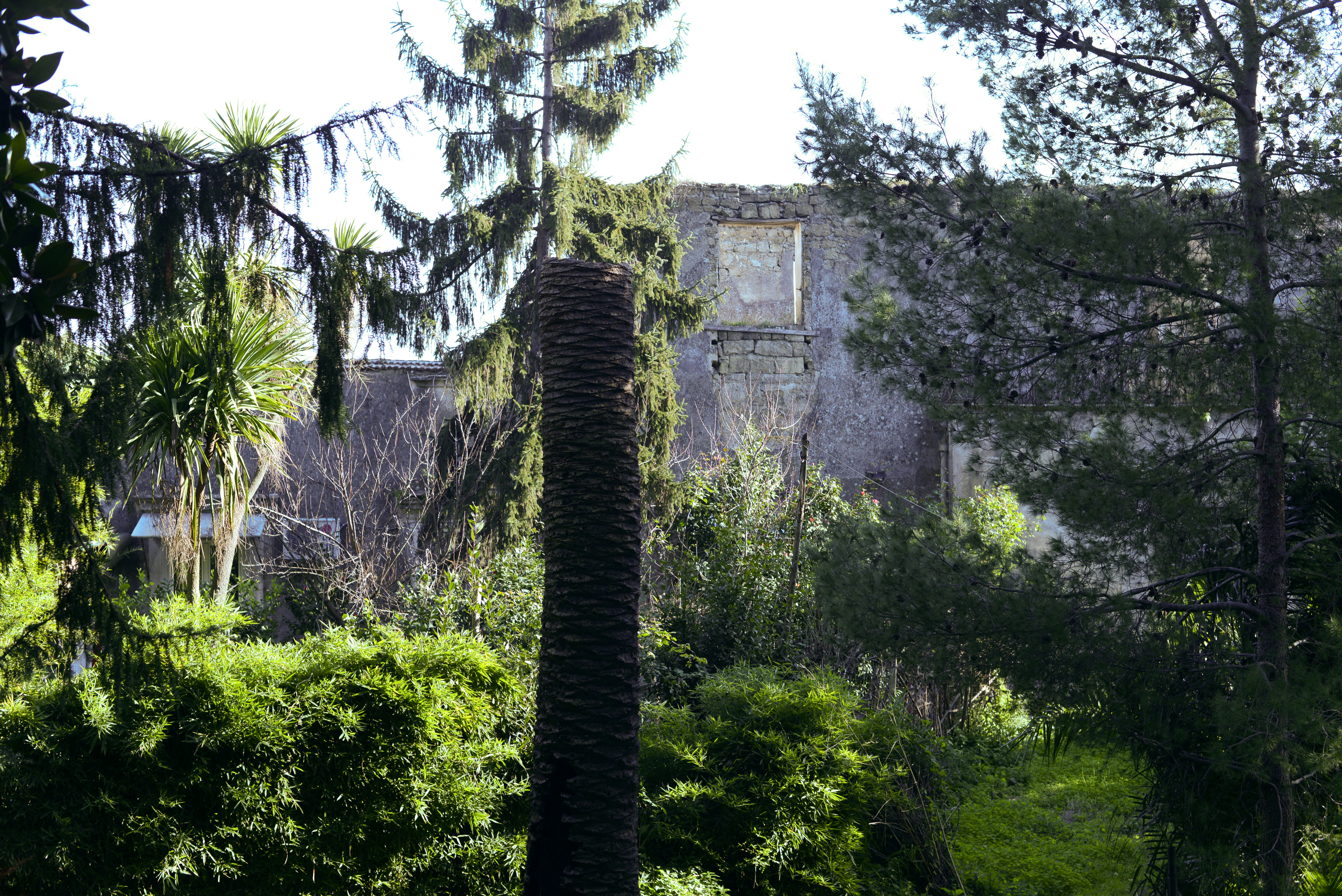
Garden

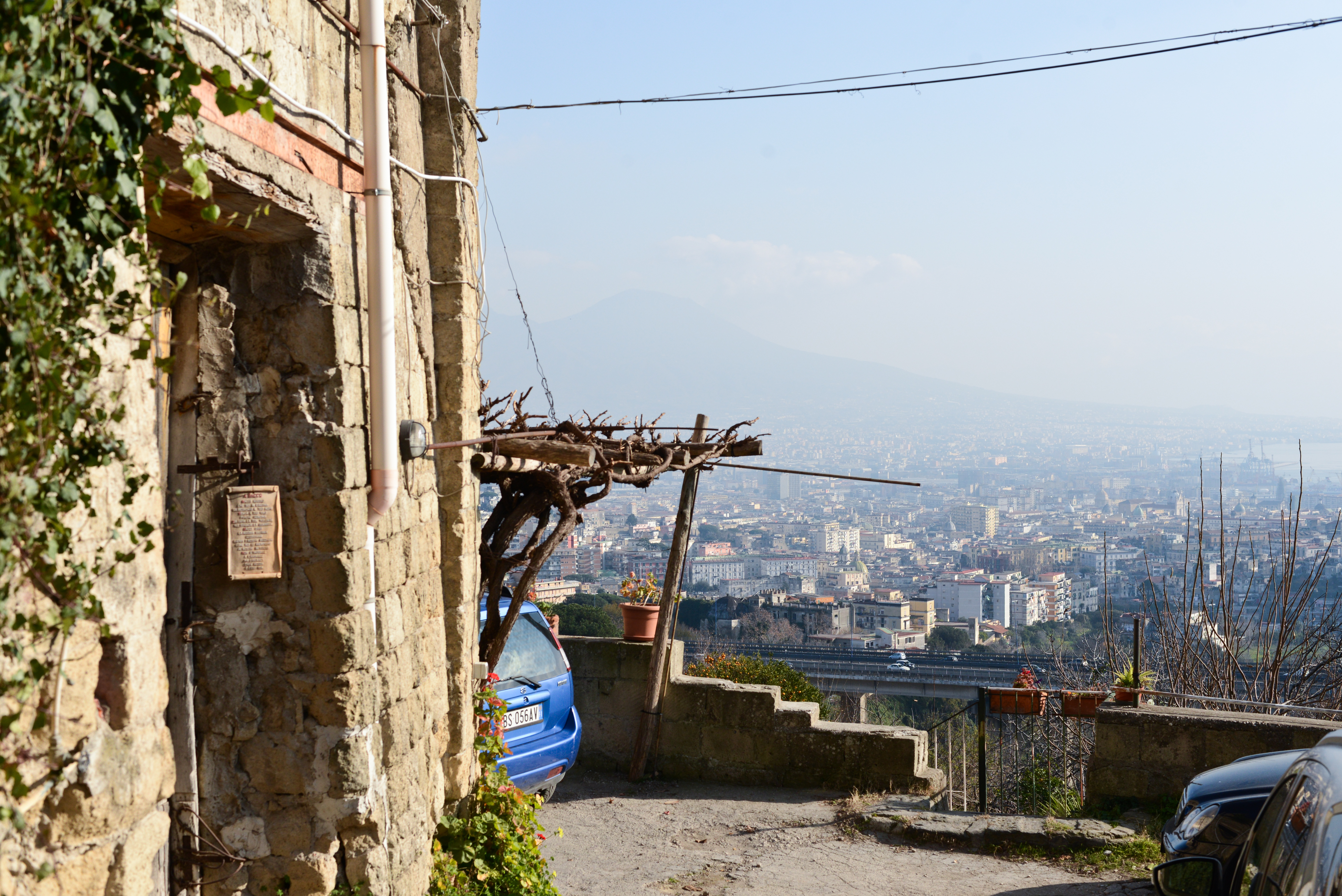
Panorama of Naples

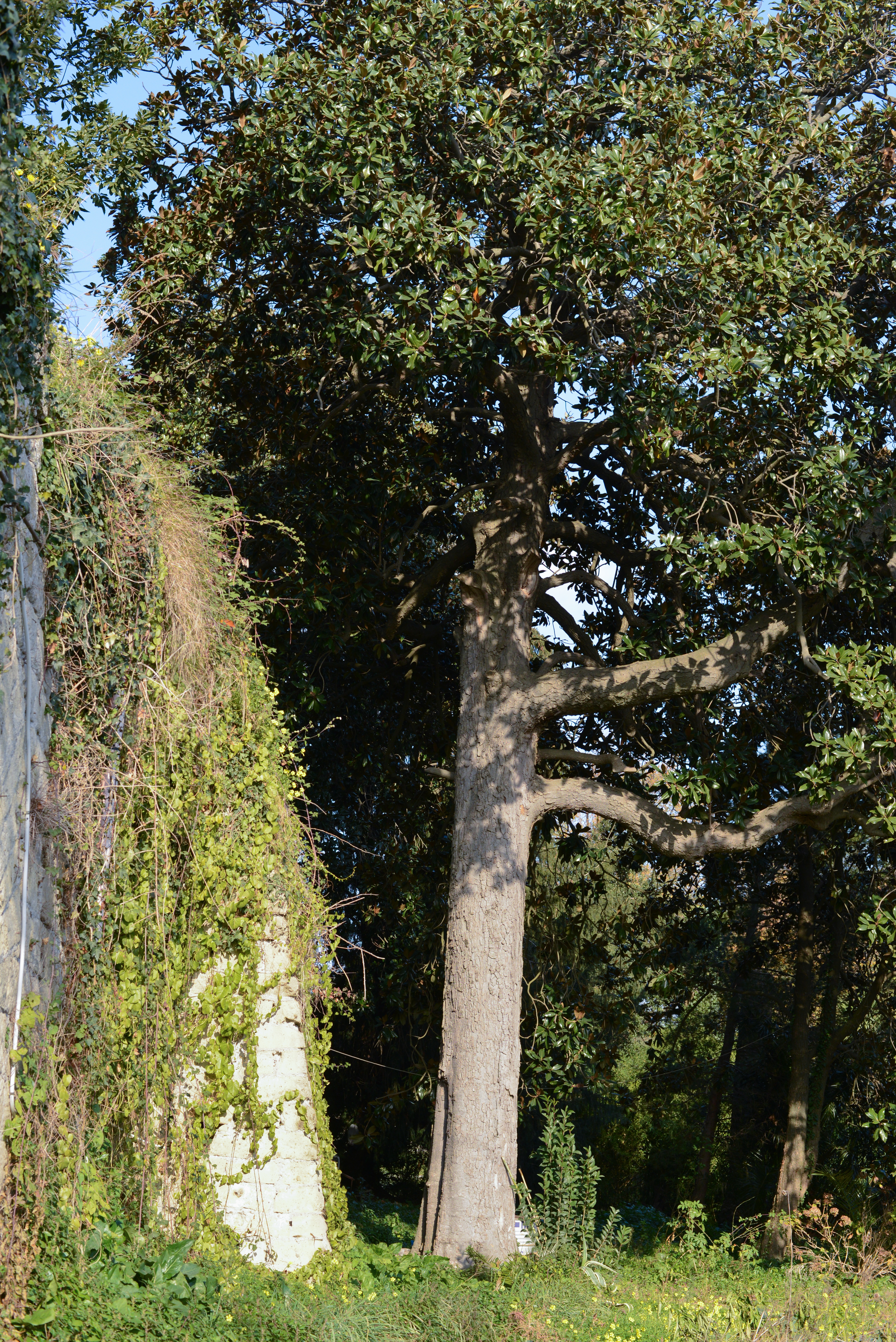
Centennial Magnolia

== See also ==
- List of villas in Naples
