= Villa Carafa di Belvedere =

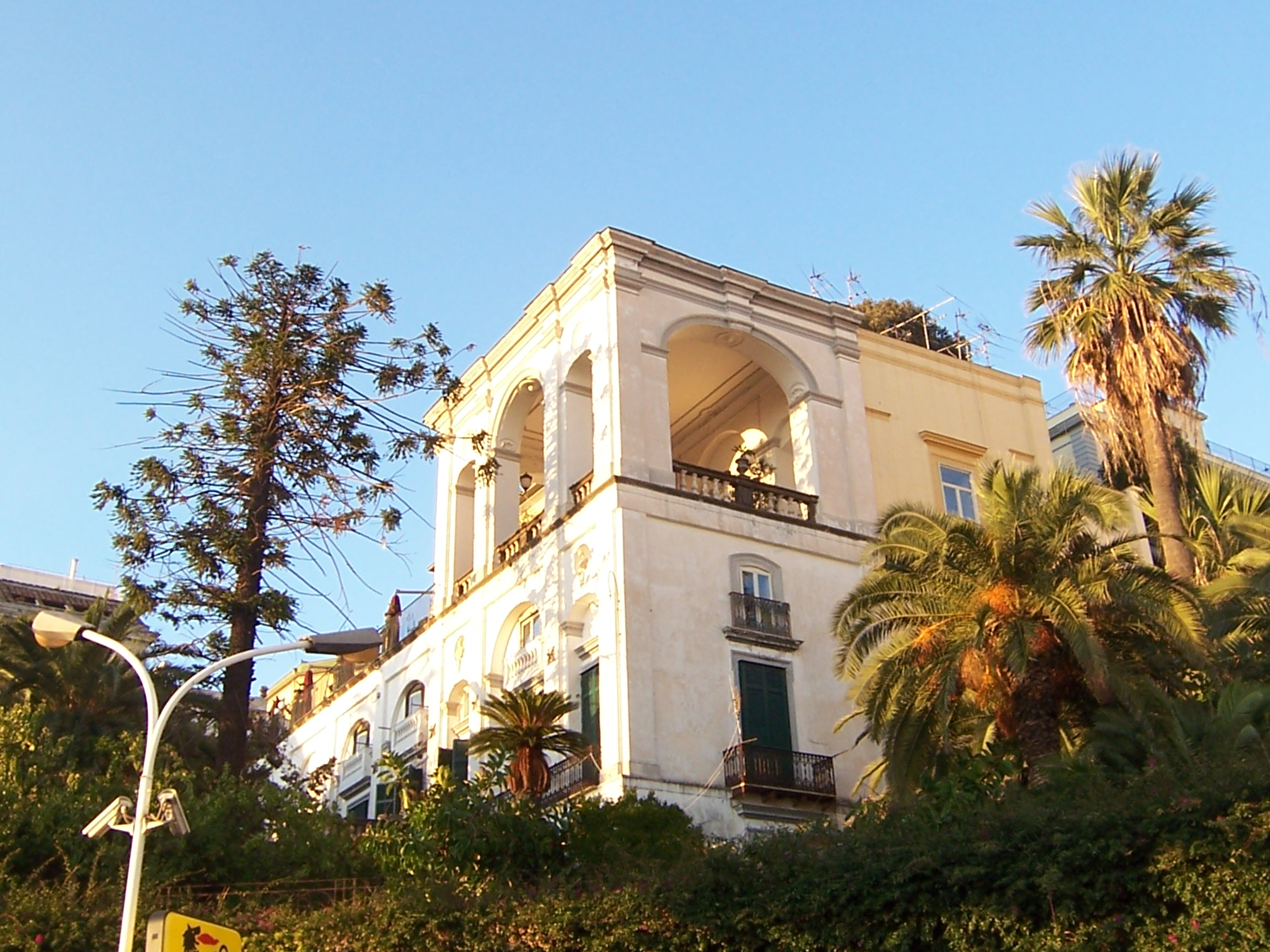
- Former names: Palazzo Vandeneynden

General information
- Location: Campania, Italy, Naples, Italy
- Coordinates: 40.840248°N 14.227800°E
- Client: Ferdinando Vandeneynden (Ferdinand van den Eynde, 1st Marquess of Castelnuovo)

Design and construction
- Architect: Bonaventura Presti

The Villa Carafa di Belvedere, formerly known as Palazzo Vandeneynden, and also known as Villa Belvedere, is a monumental villa in Naples, located in the hilly Vomero district. The villa was commissioned by the powerful magnate, nobleman and art collector Ferdinando Vandeneynden, also known as Ferdinand van den Eynde, from the Carthusian architect Bonaventura Presti.

== History ==
The villa was built at the end of 17th century as an "out of town" palace by the wealthy Flemish merchant and banker (who was awarded the title of Marquis of Castelnuovo and married the noblewoman Olimpia Piccolomini, nephew of Cardinal Celio) Ferdinando Vandeneynden, or Ferdinand van den Eynde, son of the wealthy merchant Jan van den Eynde, on the western slope of the Vomero hill, in what is now via Belvedere.

The Netherlandish nobleman, whose father had chosen Naples as his residence and the place wherein establishing his own business (like many other powerful Northern European traders), had previously commissioned from a Carthusian monk the renovation of numerous patrician residences in the city (among which the Palazzo Zevallos Stigliano, which had been acquired by his father Jan); however, Villa Belvedere, which Van den Eynde ordered him to realize from scratch, is perhaps the only work entirely done by this architect-friar, whose name was Bonaventura Presti.

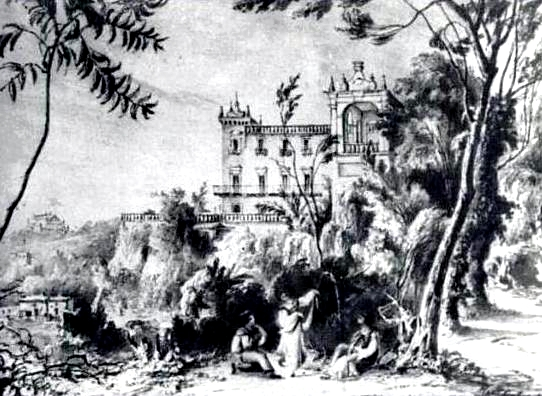
Villa Belvedere in an old print

The Vandeneynden palace was built between 1671 and 1673 according to the design of Presti. Located at the end of a long tree-lined avenue, with its entrance on the via del Vomero (via Belvedere), the building develops on two levels with a polygonal system with a courtyard closed on three sides, opening into a loggia to the west, in the direction of the hill of Posillipo. The whole project was based essentially on perspective, and it was strongly influenced by the surrounding landscape, with the Gulf of Naples to the south, and Posillipo to the west.

The Vandeneynden palace became Villa Carafa di Belvedere in 1688, when Elizabeth, daughter of the Marquis Vandeneynden, who died of consumption in 1674, married Charles Carafa IV, Prince of Belvedere.

The Carafas improved the villa by adding loggias overlooking the panorama of the gulf. Along the tree-lined avenue, which, as mentioned, constituted the access to the villa, sheds and stables were arranged, as well as an elegant 18th-century well in marble.

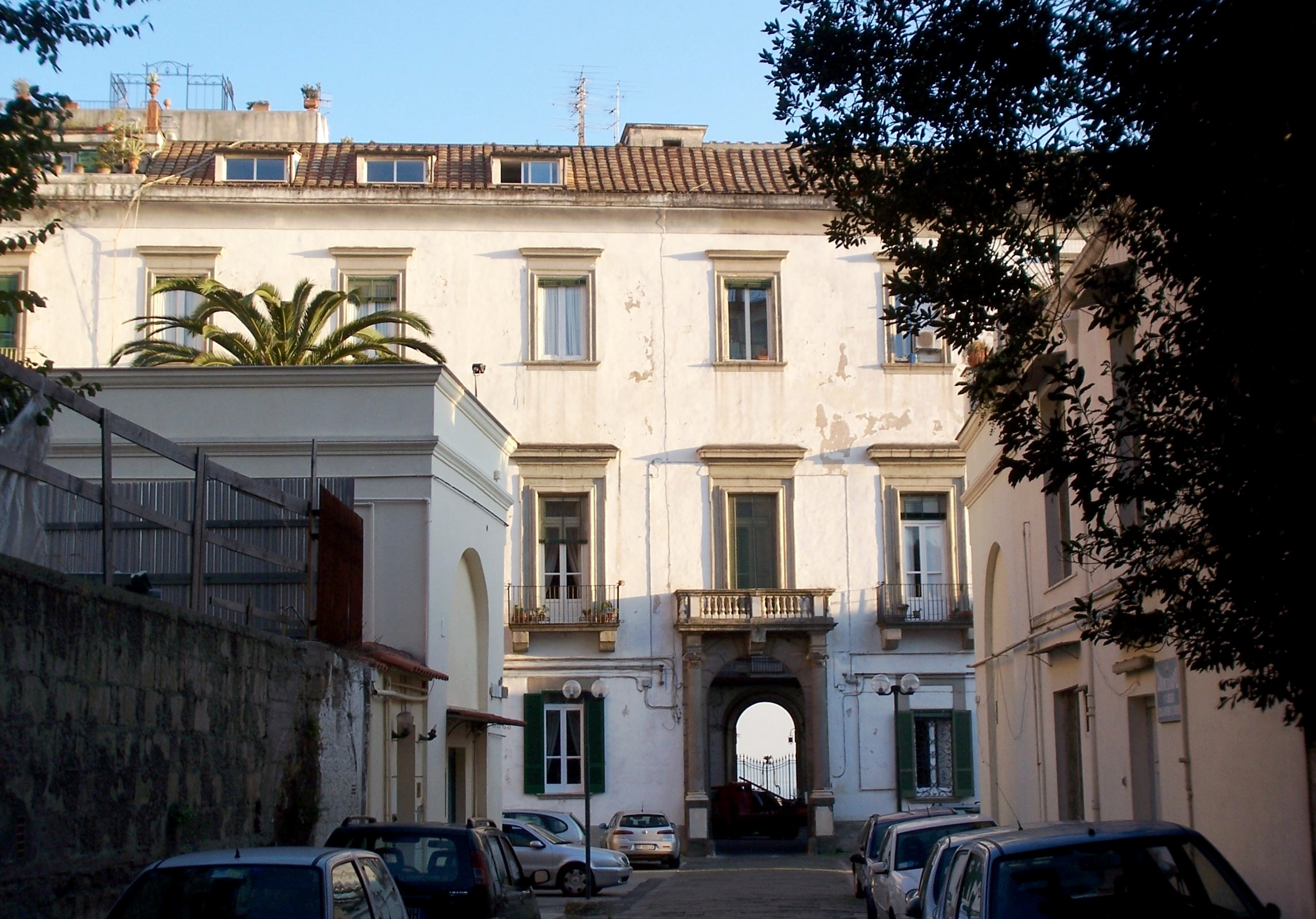
Courtyard of Villa Belvedere

The tuff necessary to carry out these alterations was taken from a part of the hill beyond the large terrace, wherein a cave was dug. The hole was later used as a cellar for the conservation of wine and meat. The cave was accessed via a well-shaped staircase which is still extant.

Villa Belvedere was very popular among the Neapolitan upper classes and the local nobles, including the Bourbons; during the summer vacations of queen Maria Carolina of Habsburg-Lorraine, wife of Ferdinand I of the Two Sicilies, magnificent parties were held, which attracted huge crowds. In fact, in the months of May and October, the villa was open to the public; so that on Thursdays and Sundays it was possible to attend musical concerts, and, later, even popular jousting and tournaments. The popularity of the villa did not decrease under French rule: the building was one of the favorite resorts of Gioacchino Murat. Inside the villa there was a precious collection of paintings and sculptures, which was assembled by Ferdinand, who in turn had inherited the prestigious collection of his father, while the vaults are still embellished with frescoes by artists such as Luca Giordano.

Ferdinand van den Eynde's precious art collection (which included several paintings by Luca Giordano) was later inherited by the Carafas and the Colonnas, as his two daughters, Elizabeth and Giovanna (Joanna), married the heirs of the Carafa and Colonna families, respectively. Between the first and second half of the 17th century, through his commerce between Flanders and Naples (which included also artworks) Van den Eynde, an avid art collector and art dealer, favored the circulation in Naples of new tastes and stylistic currents. In his collection, therefore, there were also several works by notable foreign artists. As regards Giordano's paintings in Van de Eynde's collection, included in the dowries of his two daughters, in The Lives of the Artists it is reported:

[A]mong these works (by Luca Giordano), noted as in a catalog, I learned that those that belonged to D. Ferdinando Vandeneinden, were then assigned, with the other rich furnishings among the very rich gifts, to two Princes, namely that of Sonnino, whose name is D. Giuliano Colonna Romano, and to that of Belvedere, whose name is D. Carlo Carafa, our Neapolitan, to whom the aforementioned D. Ferdinando married his two beautiful, honest and noble daughters

== Architecture and current state of conservation ==
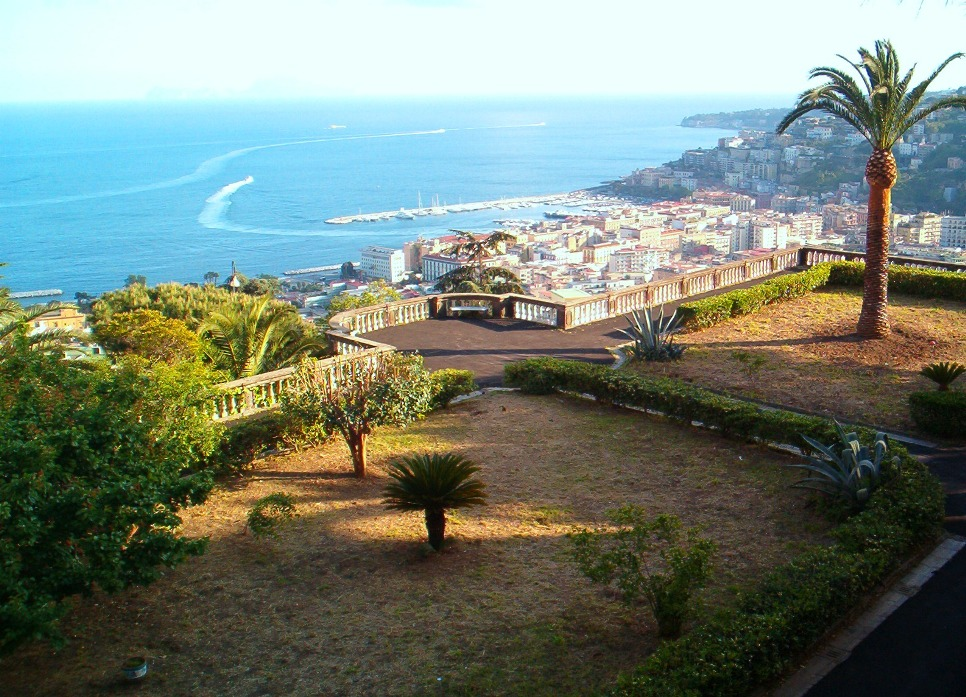
Embankment of Villa Belvedere

The architecture of the villa, as it appears today, is the result of about five centuries of stratification, with works and adjustments that have followed one another according to taste, both of the architects and the clients involved.

The contemplation of this building allows, even today, to recognize the original elements, as well as the extensions and modifications executed during the 18th century. The latter have exalted the idea of its relationship with nature, which was a fundamental aspect of the original project, and which survives today despite the most recent alterations.

Villa Belvedere represents a unique example of the oldest history of its neighborhood, Vomero. It is around this structure, in fact, that the ancient Villaggio del Vomero developed. Over the centuries, there were numerous travelers who became fascinated with it, to the point of immortalizing it in painting, drawings and sketches. Designed to open up to the surrounding nature, it is today squeezed between the buildings that have deprived it of its greenery. However, the villa still faces the Gulf of Naples.

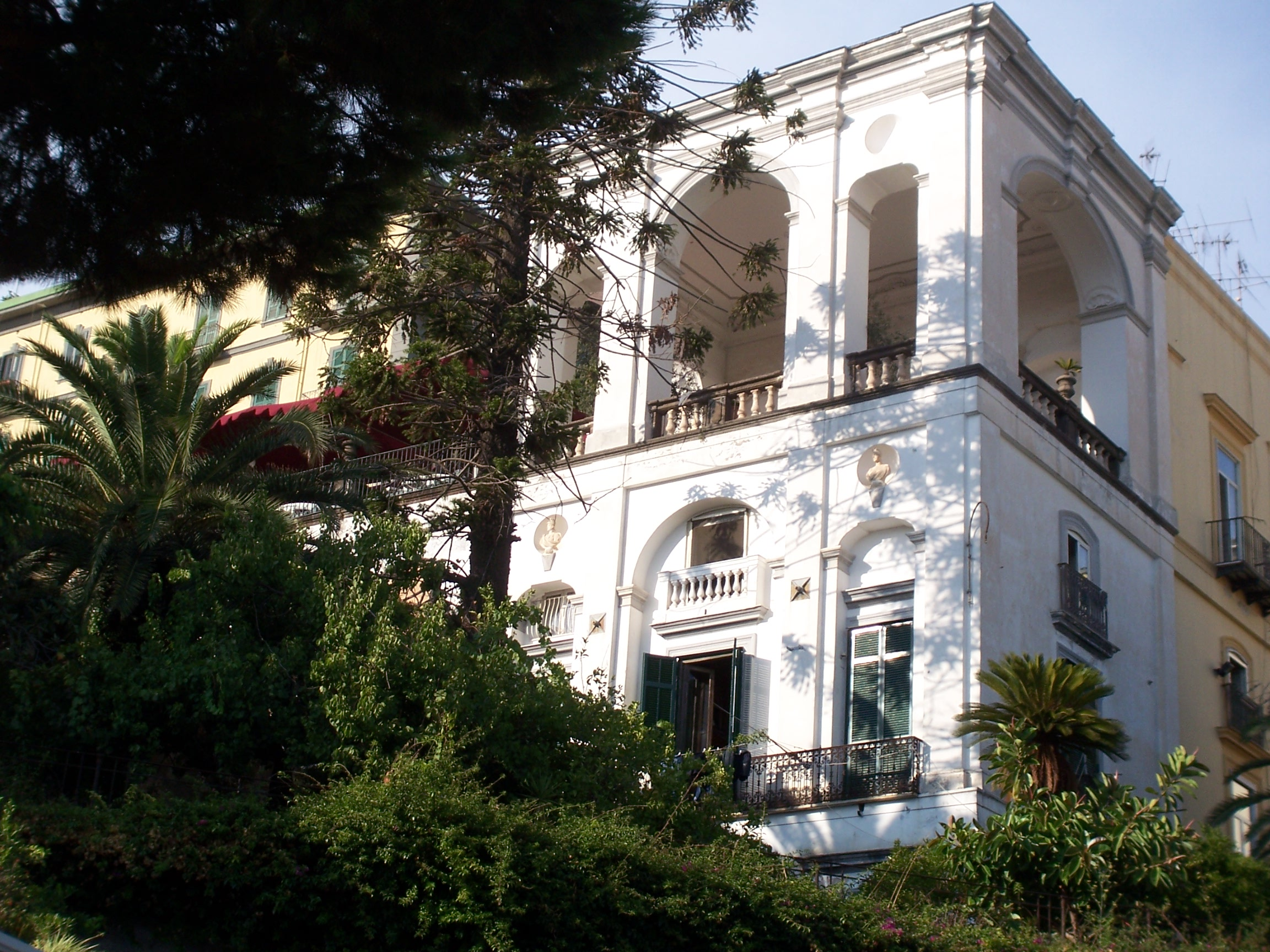
Terrace of Villa Belvedere

Comparing Duke Carafa of Noja's plan of 1775 with the view of the first Carafa's architects (ca. 1698), it is possible to discern the transformations that mark the passage from Palazzo Vandeneynden to Villa Carafa of Belvedere. It is possible to discern the progressive arrangement of the whole structure, starting from the entrance on the via del Vomero where an exedra was built (right in front of the ancient portal in peperino) to make it easier for carriages to access.

The pre-existing avenue leads to a portico, which encloses a semi-elliptical courtyard facing the north facade of the building. The loggia is connected to the main floor and acts as an element of mediation between the avenue itself and the access to the building, without interrupting the perspective axis that from the entrance crosses the entire structure as well as the terrace garden. The garden, bordered by a peperino balustrade with marble columns, is surrounded to the east by a long portico closed by glass walls, used as a greenhouse. The rooms on the piano nobile are projected towards the panorama via the large level terraces placed to the side of the northern and southern elevations.

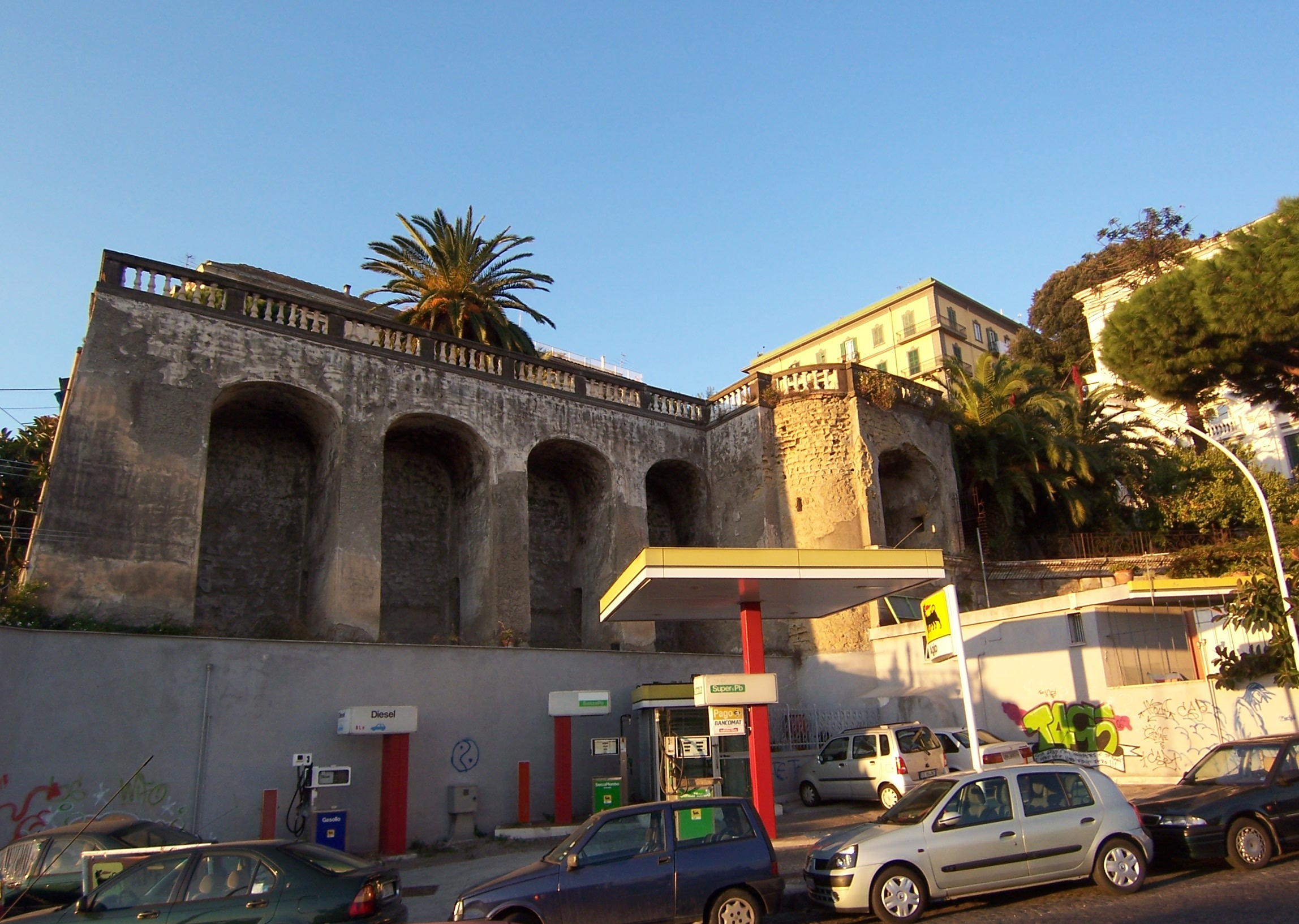
Embankment of Villa Belvedere

Of the prominence of Villa Belvedere we find numerous testimonies also in the 18th-century vedutismo of the city of Naples. The villa became in fact the symbol of the hill of Vomero, and foreign painters and engravers would represent it as a characteristic element.

By the end of the 19th century, mutation began to involve progressive aggregation to a small extent. Those which were initially conceived as open but covered spaces, of mediation, but above all of adhesion between nature and constructed, started to get closed off according to the new housing needs.

With available spaces now saturated, a series of interventions, with the aim of offering timely responses to specific needs, began. These have produced a building complex which is characterized by alterations typical of a general architectural degradation.

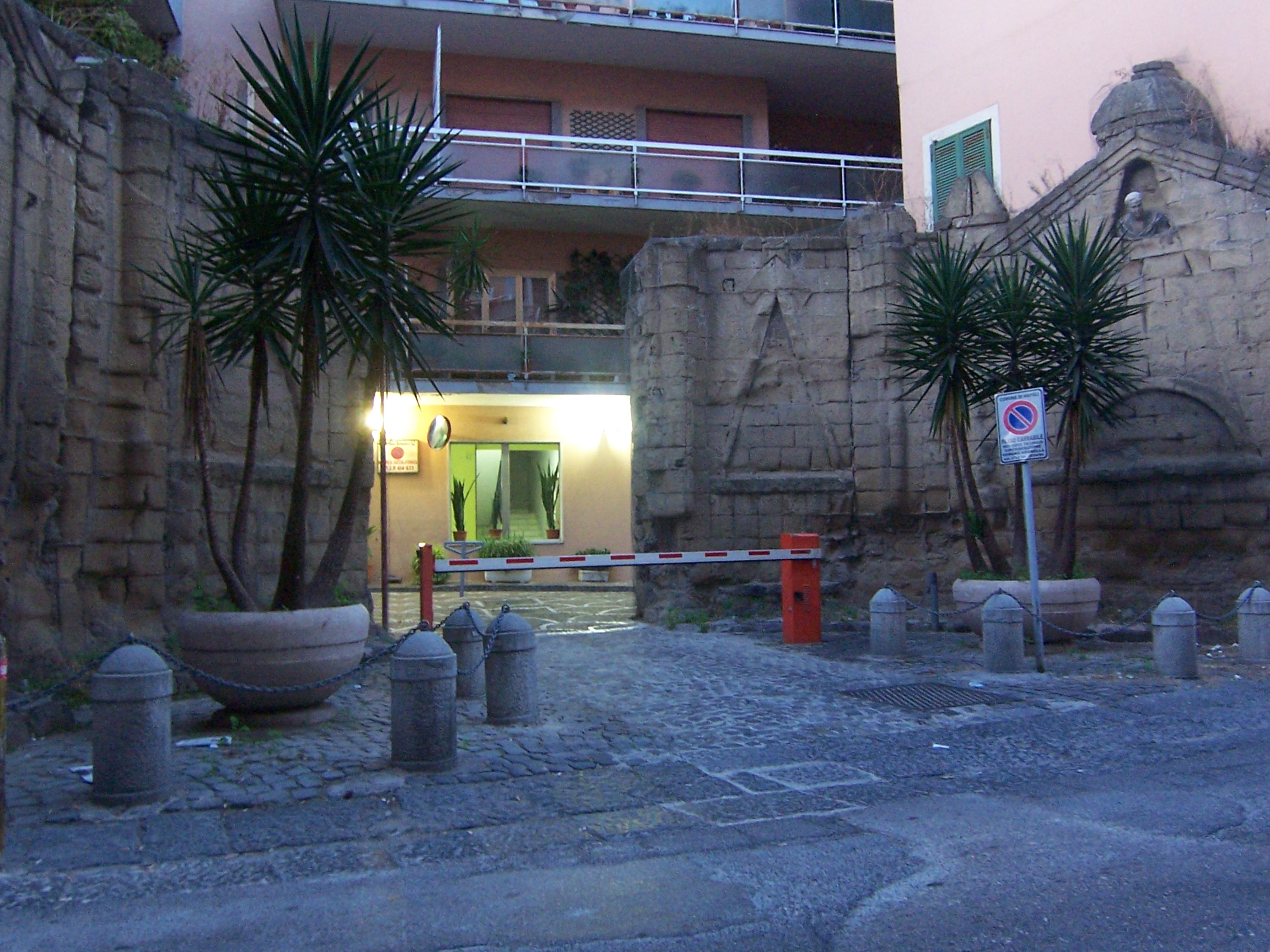
Hemicycle of Villa Belvedere

Further, at the beginning of the 20th century, Villa Belvedere, by now a condominium, lost its status as one of the few buildings on the Vomero hill.

Construction of new buildings deprived the villa of its status as a 'paradise of delights' surrounded by greenery, and, over the years, buildings of all sizes and kinds rose, ousting its greenery, as the zone got progressively lotted out. New entrances to the villa were opened along the via Aniello Falcone, leveraging the few interstices spared by the urbanization.

As mentioned, even today, the villa interacts with the scenic view of the gulf, and represents a living memento of Vomero's past.
