= Villa Rocca Matilde =

Coordinates: 40.8095°N 14.2066°E

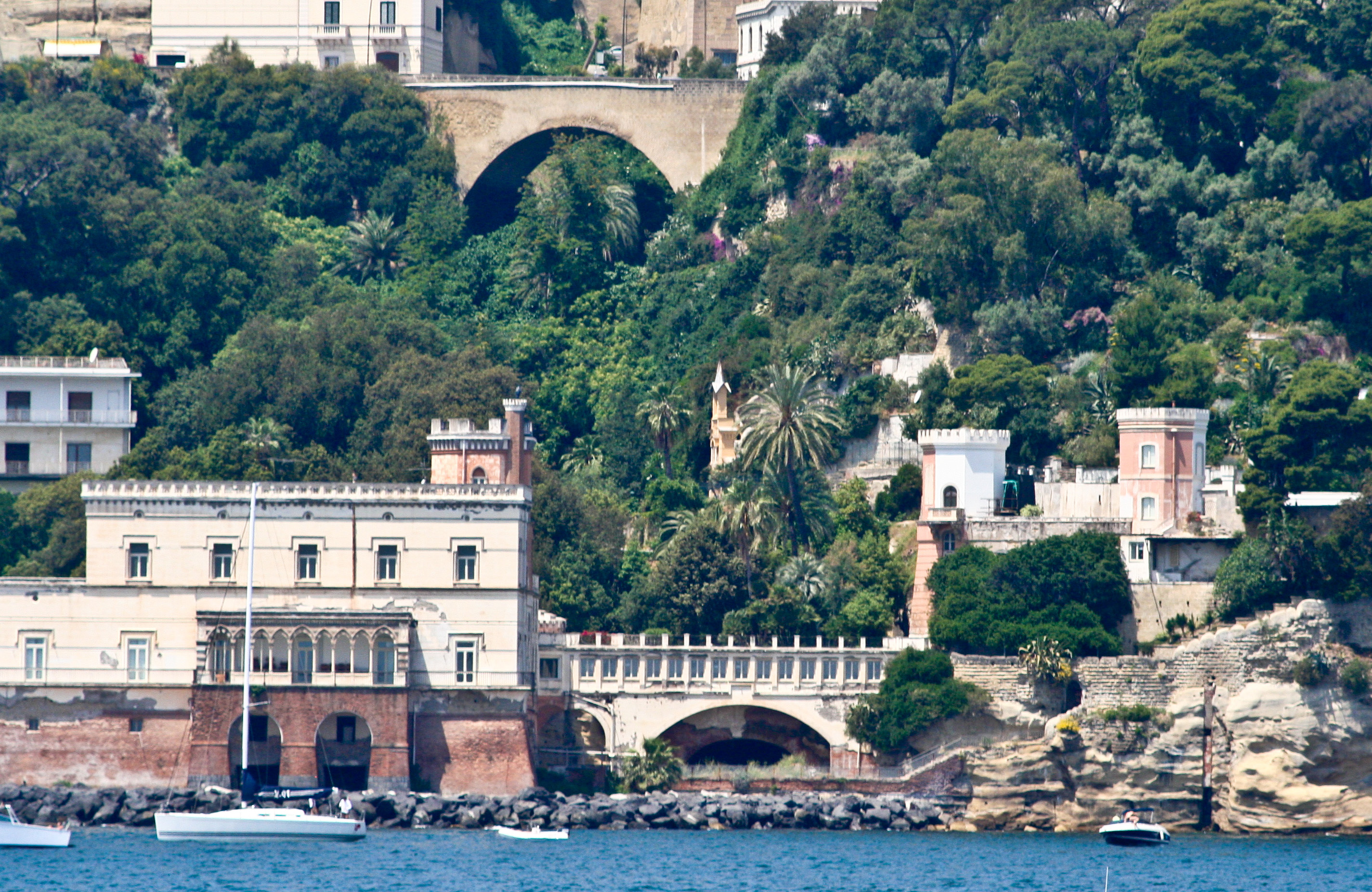
View of the Villa from the Bay of Naples

Villa Rocca Matilde is a 19th-century seaside villa, located on Via Posillipo #222, below Piazza San Luigi, in the neighborhood of Posillipo, Naples, Italy.

== History ==
The present villa, with its faux-crenelated towers, was built atop a prior 17th-century palace first erected by Orazio d'Acunto. The Englishwoman Luisa Dillon Strahan, Marchesa di Salza, acquired the property in 1842, and named the house Rocca or Castle Matilde, after the name of her eldest daughter, Matilde. Subsequently, it was further refurbished by the next owner, George Wightwick Rendel. A subsequent owner was the merchant William Peirce and Achille Lauro. It is sometimes called Villa Lauro. It has since been bought by a private group.
