= Giovanni Lorenzo =

Giovanni Lorenzo can refer to:

- Gian Lorenzo Bernini (1598–1680), Italian sculptor
- Giovanni Lorenzo Berti (1696–1766), Italian Augustinian theologian
- Giovanni Lorenzo Bertolotti (1640–1721), Italian painter of the Baroque period
- Giovanni Lorenzo Lulier (c. 1662–1700), Baroque Italian composer

== See also ==
- Giovanni Di Lorenzo (born 1993), Italian footballer
- Giovanni di Lorenzo (journalist) (born 1959), German-Italian journalist
- Giovanni Lorenzo (boxer) (born 1980), Dominican boxer
