= Gian Lorenzo Berti (Traversi) =

Painting by Gaspare Traversi

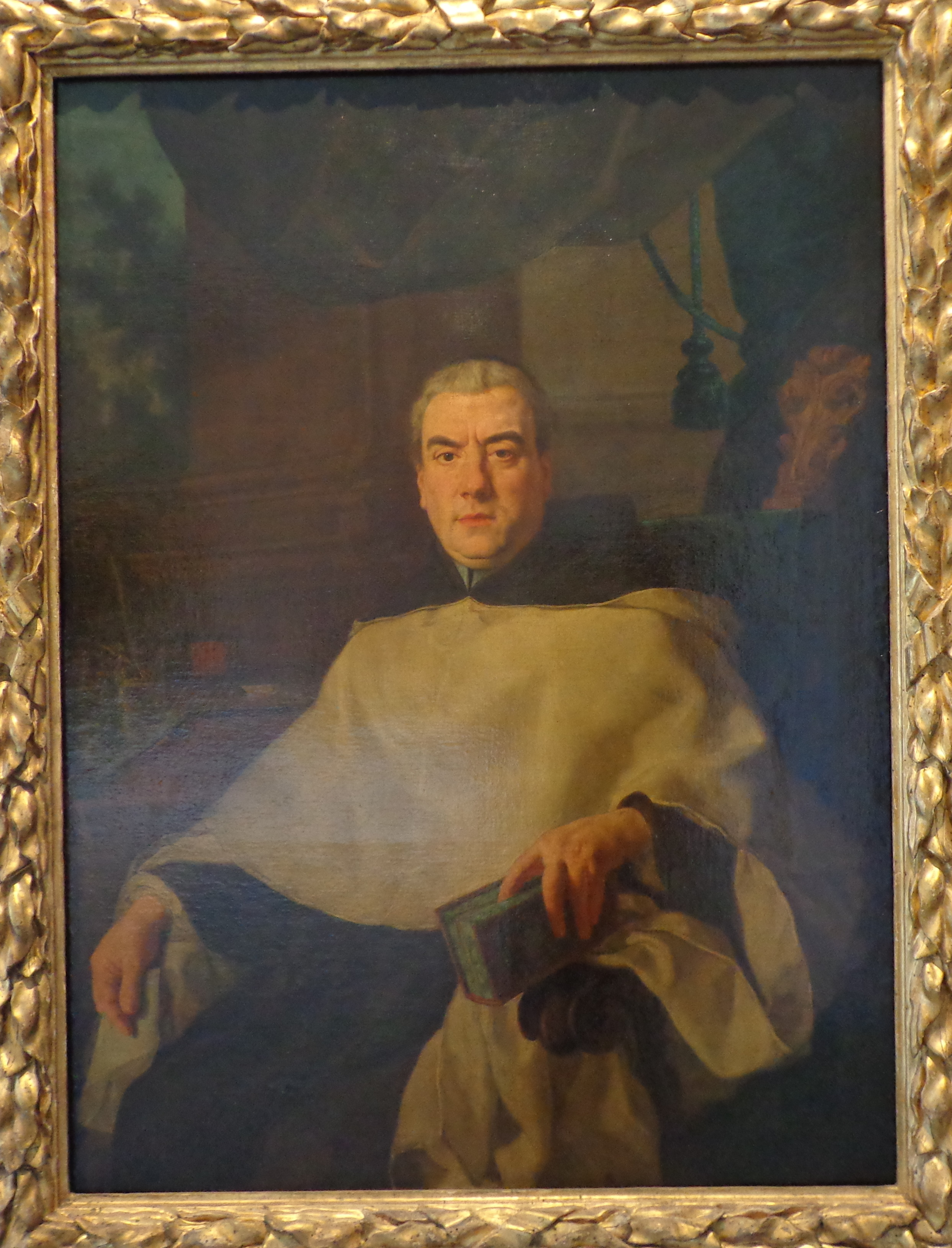
- Artist: Gaspare Traversi
- Year: between 1754 and 1756
- Medium: oil painting on canvas
- Movement: Rococo portrait painting
- Subject: Giovanni Lorenzo Berti
- Dimensions: 135 cm × 101 cm (53 in × 40 in)
- Location: Musée des Beaux-Arts, Strasbourg
- Accession: 1890

Gian Lorenzo Berti is a portrait painting Neapolitan Italian Rococo painter Gaspare Traversi. It is on display in the Musée des Beaux-Arts of Strasbourg, France. Its inventory number is 182.

The painting depicts the Augustinian theologian Giovanni Lorenzo Berti (also known as Gianlorenzo Berti, or Gian Lorenzo Berti), and was painted in Rome between 1754 and 1756. It was bought for the museum in 1890 by Wilhelm von Bode, from the collection of Gustave Rothan, together with Ribera's Saint Peter and Saint Paul.

On account of its severity and its stateliness, this 18th-century portrait painting was at first thought to be a work by the 17th-century painter Andrea Sacchi, who had in fact preceded Traversi by several generations. It was attributed to Traversi by Roberto Longhi in 1922; Longhi would later heap fulsome praise on the painting, calling it "one of the most beautiful portraits of the whole 18th century" in a 1927 article full of enthusiastic descriptions. The sitter was subsequently identified as Berti by Francesco Barocelli in 1990.
