= Giovanni Lorenzo Berti =

Italian theologian

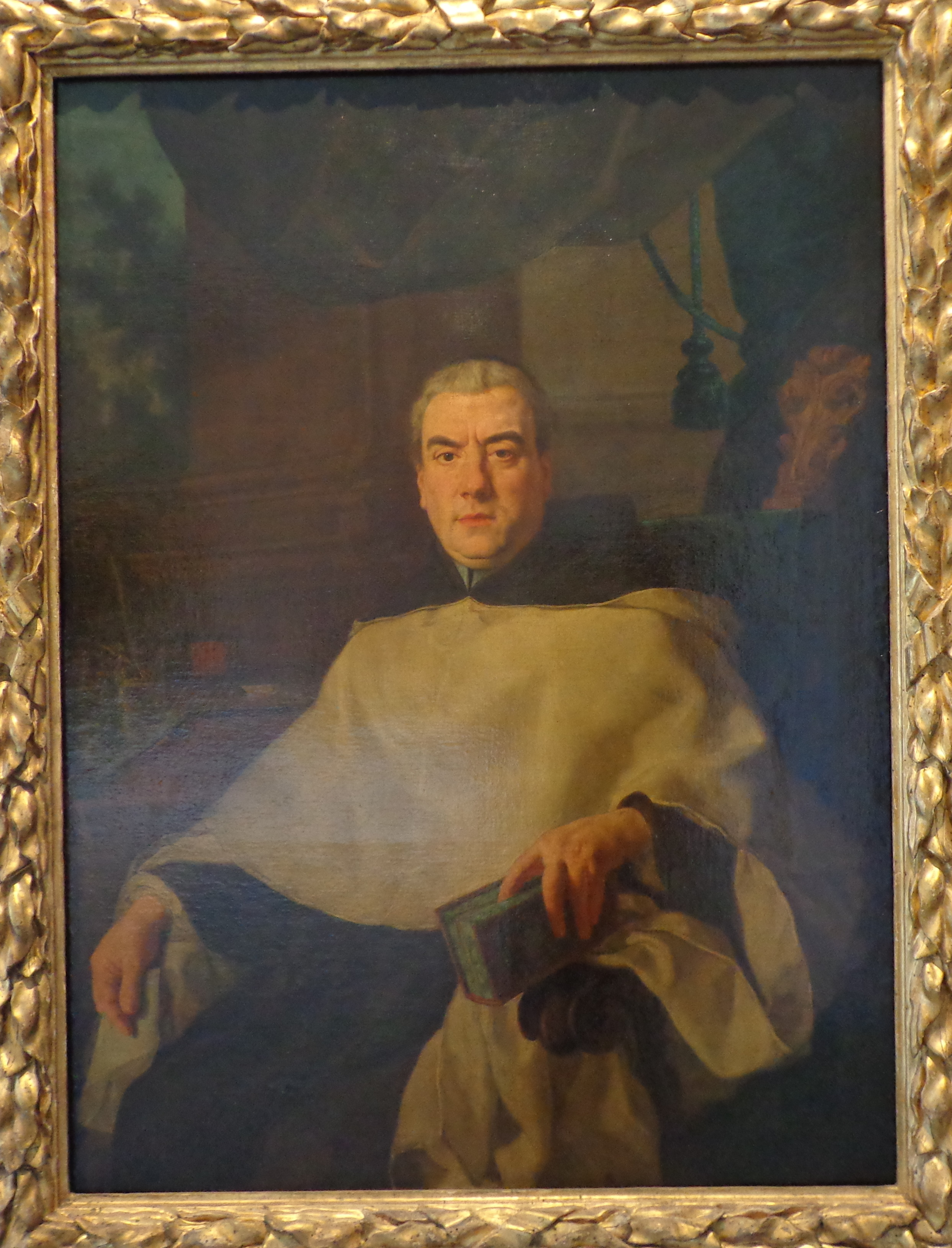
Portrait by Gaspare Traversi

Giovanni Lorenzo Berti (1696–1766), also known by his Latinized name Johannes Laurentius Berti, was an Italian Augustinian theologian. The General of the Order of Hermits of St. Augustine, Schiaffinati, instructed him to write a book, to be used by all the students of the Order, expounding the whole of Augustine of Hippo's thought and particularly his doctrine of grace and free will. His huge Opus de Theologicis Disciplinis expounded not the private views of a theologian, but those of the Augustinian Order and therefore had a semi-official status in the Roman Catholic Church.

He was denounced to the Holy Office as a Jansenist by two French bishops. In December 1750, Pope Benedict XIV wrote a letter to one of them saying that the work had been submitted to competent theologians who had judged it to be sound; to the other he wrote a letter in May 1751 saying, that nothing had been found in his work contrary to any decision of the Church.

== Biography ==
Born in 1695, in the Tuscan town of Serravezza, from a modest family, he entered the Order of Augustinians at the age of 15, in which he was later called to assume important positions: secretary general of the Order and prefect of the Biblioteca Angelica in Rome.

A man of varied culture, an expert in Greek language and Hebrew language and also interested in mathematical disciplines, Berti taught ecclesiastical history at the University of Pisa.

For his work De theologicis disciplinis (Rome, 1739–1745), an extensive exposition of Augustine of Hippo theology, he was accused of Jansenism, but the accusation, supported by French bishops Jean d'Ise de Saléon and Jean-Joseph Languet de Gergy, brought to the attention of the ecclesiastical hierarchies, was dropped at the behest of Pope Benedict XIV. Berti in his defense published (Rome, 1747) Augustinianum systema de gratia ab iniqua Bajani, & Janseniani erroris insimulatione vindicatum.... Another work of his of note is Ecclesiasticae historiae breuiarium (Pisa, 1760), a text that was widely circulated[3] and had numerous reprints until the last one by the publisher Remondini (firm) of Bassano del Grappa in 1823.

In 1762 Three Consultations, made in defense of smallpox inoculation by three living learned Tuscan theologians, was printed in Milan. The work, in defense of the inoculation in the individual to be immunized, of material taken from smallpox lesions (the "Variolation") contains, in addition to a text by Berti, two other articles by the theologians Francesco Raimondo Adami and Gaetano Veraci.

He died in Pisa, aged sixty-nine, in 1766.
