= The Concert (Gaspare Traversi) =

Painting by Gaspare Traversi

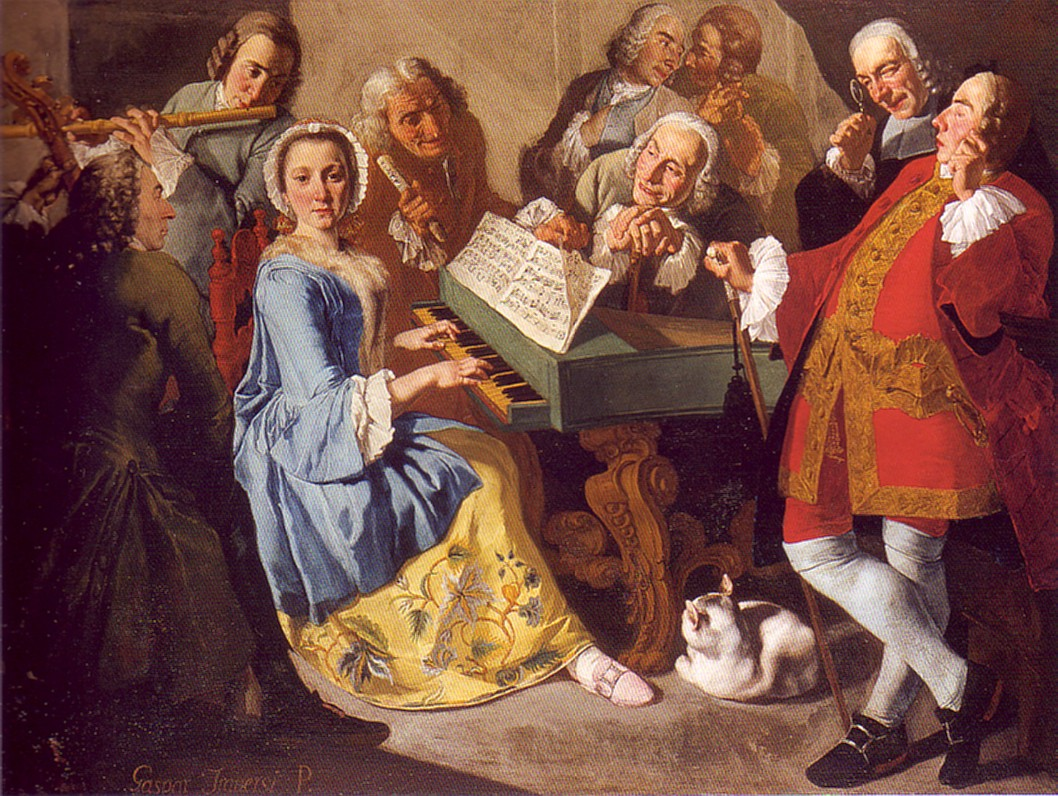
- Artist: Gaspare Traversi
- Medium: Oil on canvas
- Dimensions: 152 cm × 204 cm (60 in × 80 in)
- Location: Nelson Atkins Museum of Art, Kansas City, Missouri

The Concert is a circa 1760 painting by the Italian late-Baroque painter Gaspare Traversi. This artist, active in Naples Italy, is best known for his humorous and intricate genre works like this one.

== Description ==
The painting depicts a small crowded room hosting a concert involving either a fortepiano or harpsichord, cello, and flute. The central figure, the bonneted young women dressed in an elegant blue and yellow gown and playing the piano, gazes toward the spectator. To her right and surrounding the piano are fashionably dressed older men. Two hold canes, and two hold private conversations. Two fixate, perhaps leer, at the young woman. One gentleman holds perhaps a small wind instrument in his hand. Near the woman's right foot, is a cat, facing away from us. The scene, somewhat unsettling, appears to convey some cryptic allegory.

An alternative explanation is that the structure, if not subject, of the painting may be derived from a similar Concerto picture, attributed to Traversi, and on display at the Casa-Museu Pinacoteca Braamcamp Freire in Santarém, Portugal. The subject of the painting is putatively that of Maria Barbara of Portugal playing the harpsichord, being tutored by a white-haired Domenico Scarlatti raising his hand, and watched over by a red-coated Ferdinand VI of Spain. In this painting, the pianist is focused on her playing and the king is dapper and young.

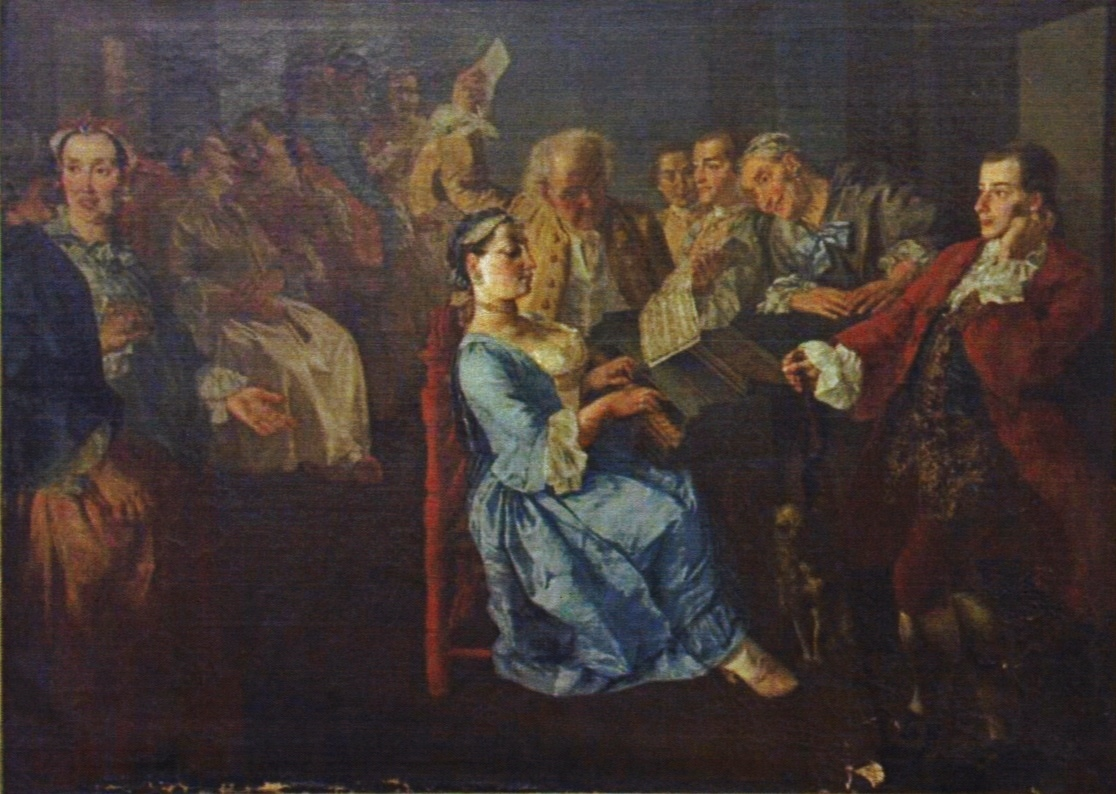
