= San Pietro d'Alcantara, Parma =

Church building in Parma, Italy

Coordinates: 44°47′48.06″N 10°20′03.93″E

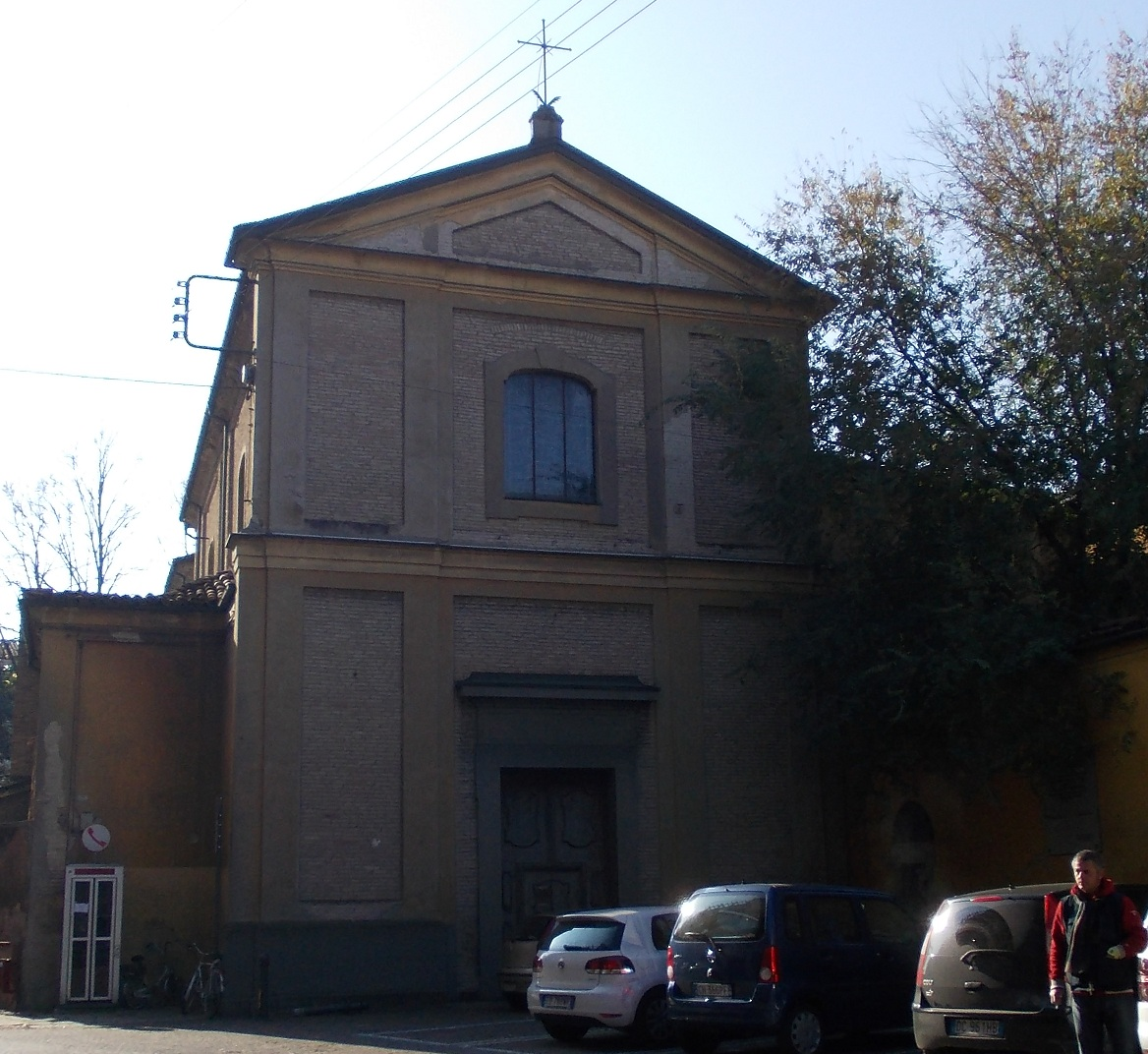

The church of San Pietro d'Alcantara is found on via Padre Onorio in Parma. The church is dedicated to the canonized Franciscan friar, Peter of Alcantara.

== History ==
Construction at this site began in 1706, next to a reformed Franciscan monastery. In 1810, Napoleon closed the monastery. The church was not reconsecrated till 1927.

== Artworks ==
Artworks in San Pietro include:

- Glory of St. Peter of Alcantara, by Clemente Ruta (1736)
- Pentecost, by Gaspare Traversi (1758)
