= Gaspare Traversi =

Italian painter

Gasparo Traversi
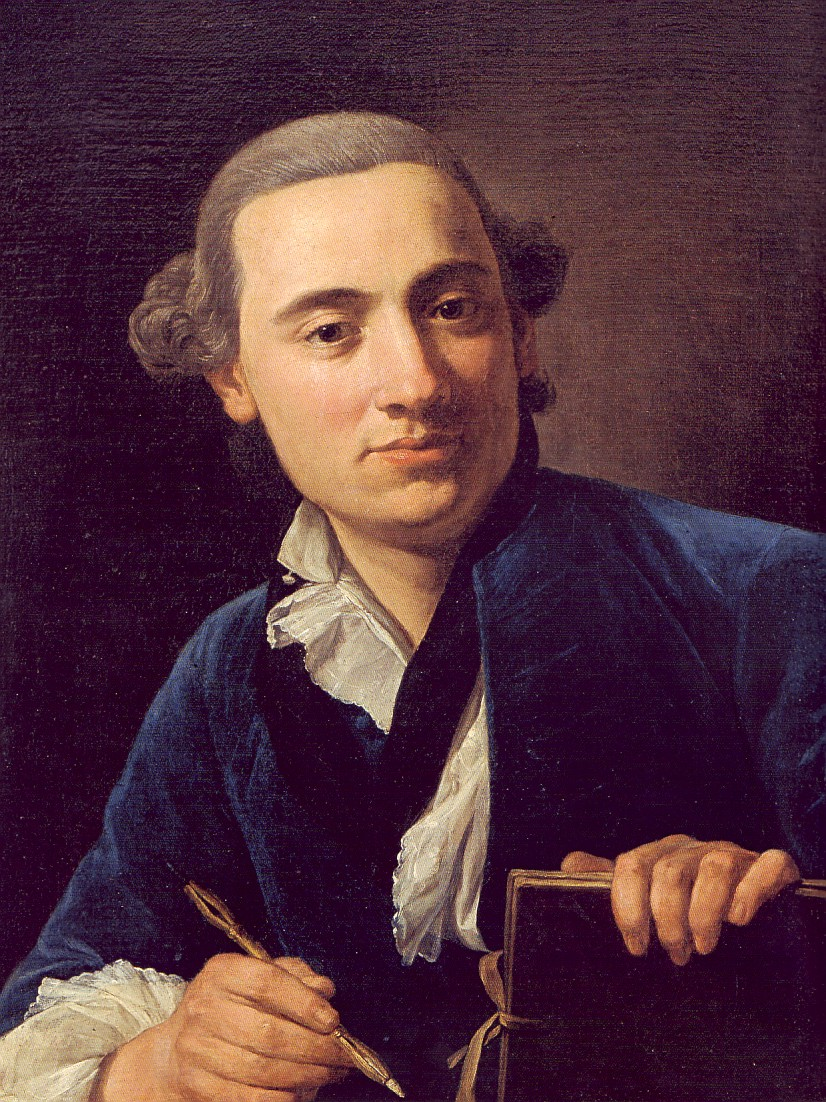
- Gasparo Traversi, Self-portrait, c. 1750, Seattle Art Museum
- Born: February 1722; Naples, Kingdom of Naples
- Died: 1 November 1770 (aged 48); Rome, Papal States
- Education: Francesco Solimena
- Known for: Painting Genre works

Gaspare Traversi (February 1722 – 1 November 1770) was an Italian Rococo painter best known for his genre works. Active mostly in his native city of Naples, he also painted throughout the Italian peninsula, including a stay in Parma.

== Biography ==
=== Early life and education ===
Gaspare appears to have been born to a Genoese merchant living in Naples. He appears to have been baptized on February 15, 1722, in the church of Santa Maria dell'Incoronatella in Naples under the name Gasparro Giovanni Battista Pascale Traversa. He trained under Francesco Solimena. He was a contemporary of other Solimena pupils, Giuseppe Bonito (1707–1789), also a genre painter, and Francesco de Mura (1696–1784).

=== Early career ===
Traversi's early works, while still indebted to Solimena, already reveal a deep and highly individual realism, for example Job Derided (National Museum in Warsaw), the Portrait of a Man (L'Aquila, De Agostini Dragonetti, priv. col.) and The Schoolmaster. The Schoolmaster, with three-quarter-length figures in a compressed and uneasy space, established the format and subject-matter of his later pictures of contemporary life. In such pictures he transcended the limitations of genre painting: his lucid, at times merciless, portrayals of local people satirize the social aspirations of the emergent bourgeois class in southern Italy.

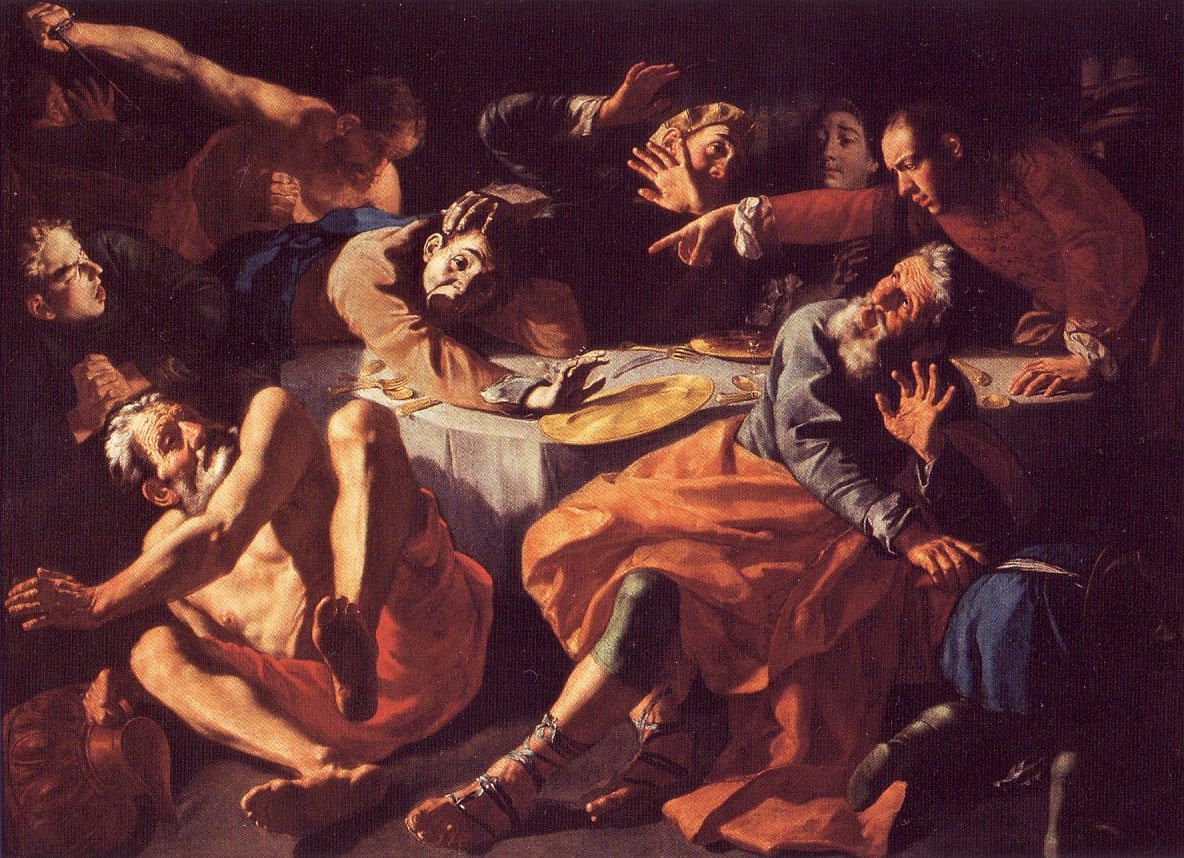
Absalom murders Amnon, Basilica of Saint Paul Outside the Walls, Rome

From 1752 Traversi spent a great deal of time in Rome, from this date onwards apparently residing alternately there and in Naples. In 1752 he painted a series of six canvases for the Roman Basilica of Saint Paul Outside the Walls, in which he interpreted biblical and apocryphal subjects as scenes from everyday life. Among these paintings is the powerfully realistic Feast of Absalom, a turbulent composition characterized by startling contrasts of light and dark and by figures whose dramatic gestures and expressions of pain and fear recall the art of Caravaggio and Ribera.

In Rome one of his major clients was Raffaello Rossi da Lugagnano, a leading member of the Franciscan order. The many religious paintings he commissioned from Traversi include five scenes from the Passion (1753; Galleria nazionale di Parma), sent to the convent of Castell'Arquato; the fourteen Stations of the Cross, sent to the church of San Rocco in Borgo Val di Taro, near Parma; and the Pentecost, painted in 1757 for the church of San Pietro d'Alcantara, Parma.

An awareness of Traversi's work thus spread beyond central and southern Italy, revealing his similarity to northern Italian painters, such as Giacomo Ceruti and Fra Galgario, who were also concerned to restore the 17th-century naturalist tradition. In their fuller, more rounded and classical forms these religious works suggest that Traversi was interested in the art of Marco Benefial, while their chiaroscuro and naturalism recalls the style of the Venetian Giovanni Battista Piazzetta, some of whose drawings and paintings he may have known.

=== Years of maturity ===
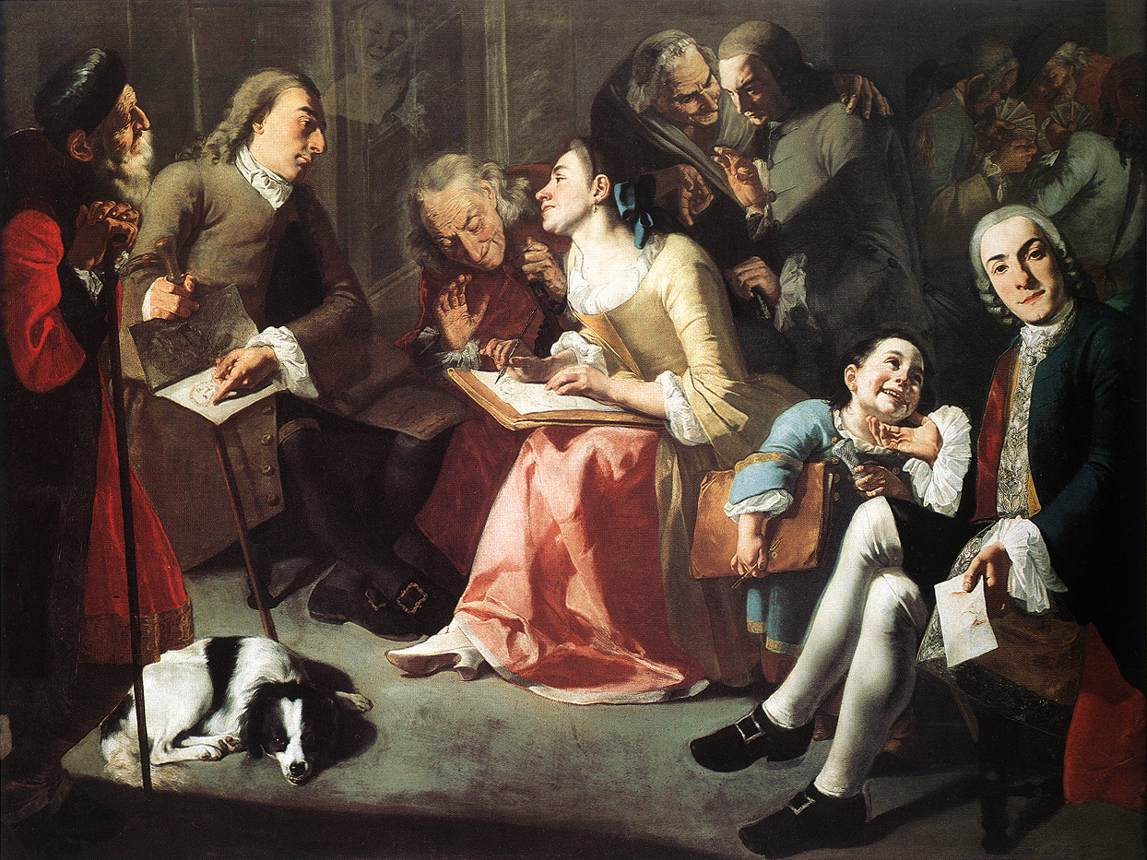
The Drawing Lesson, c. 1755, Nelson-Atkins Museum of Art, Kansas City

In this mature period, from c. 1752 into the 1760s, Traversi was producing genre paintings, sometimes sending them from Rome to Naples with his brother Francesco. These include some of his most powerful and savage works: The Concert and the Secret Letter (both Naples, Banco di Napoli, on dep. Naples, Capodimonte); the Drawing Lesson and the painting usually called Concert 'a voce sola' (both Kansas City, Nelson-Atkins Museum of Art); The Fortune-teller, which revives one of the most popular Caravaggesque themes, and the Love Letter (both Naples, priv. col.). His famous Portrait of a Man (1760; Naples, Museo di Capodimonte) and the penetrating and vigorous portrait of Raffaello Rossi da Lugagnano (two versions: Rome, priv. col.; Bologna, Cassa di Risparmio) are fine examples of his ability to portray strong-willed character and to suggest a social type. Among his last works are the Portrait of a Canon (1770; New York, Paul Ganz priv. col.), Judith (Genoa, priv. col.), the Blind Beggar (London, Cowper Cooper priv. col.) and the Old Pedant (Rome, priv. col.). He left no pupils, yet his art was widely influential, particularly on the work of Lorenzo de Caro, on the genre paintings of Giuseppe Bonito and on certain paintings by Orazio Solimena and Giovanni Battista Rossi. Traversi was a focus of a monograph by Roberto Longhi.

== Legacy ==
Traversi can be described as a Neapolitan Hogarth, Steen or Longhi, working in a Caravaggist style. Traversi's satirical paintings typically depict animated groups of bourgeois protagonists that seem compressed physically into an indoor pictorial space that can barely contain them. Even his religious canvases have foreshortened crowding. Facial expressions are lively and varied; some of the characters, often children, stare at the viewer. Women are often situated in either a foolish or ironic situation, or engage in a pulchritudinous talent, while men leer or participate with other intentions in mind. One could view these as elaborations of moralistic tales, such as Caravaggio's The Fortune Teller, a topic which Traversi also depicted, but Traversi's living rooms are more densely populated, and the emotions, as well as the situations, teeter awkwardly with imbalance.

== Gallery ==
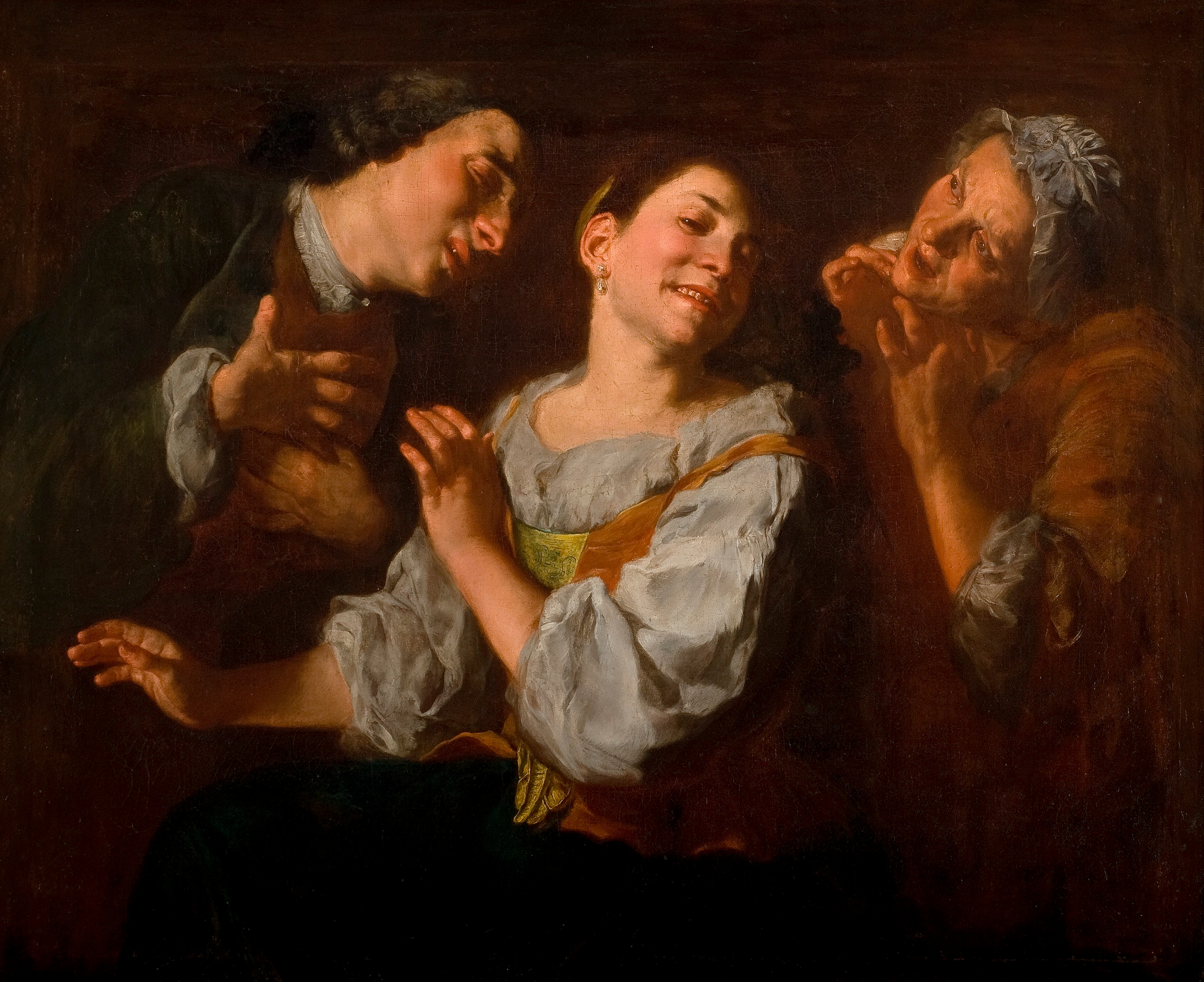
The Seduction

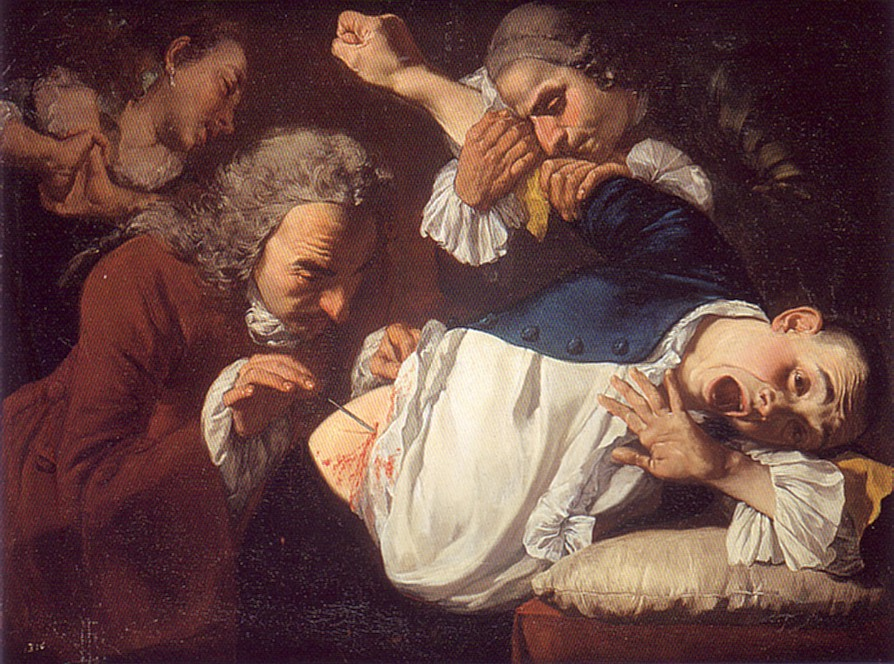
Surgeon inspects Wound

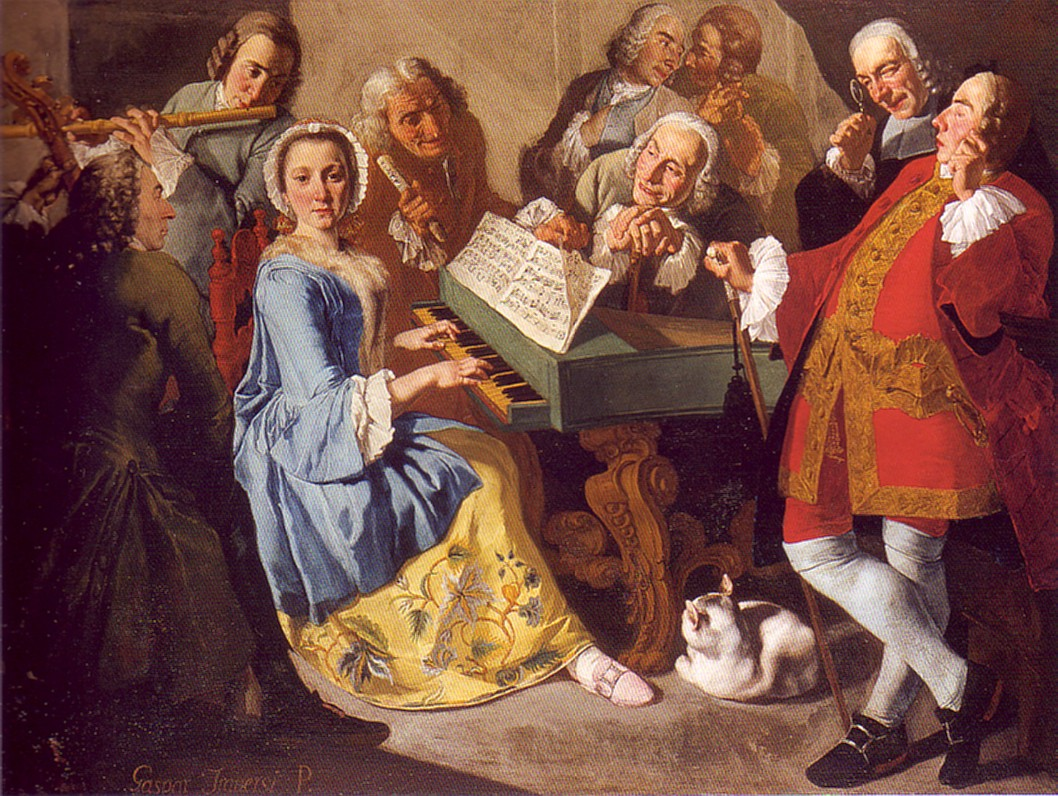
The Concert

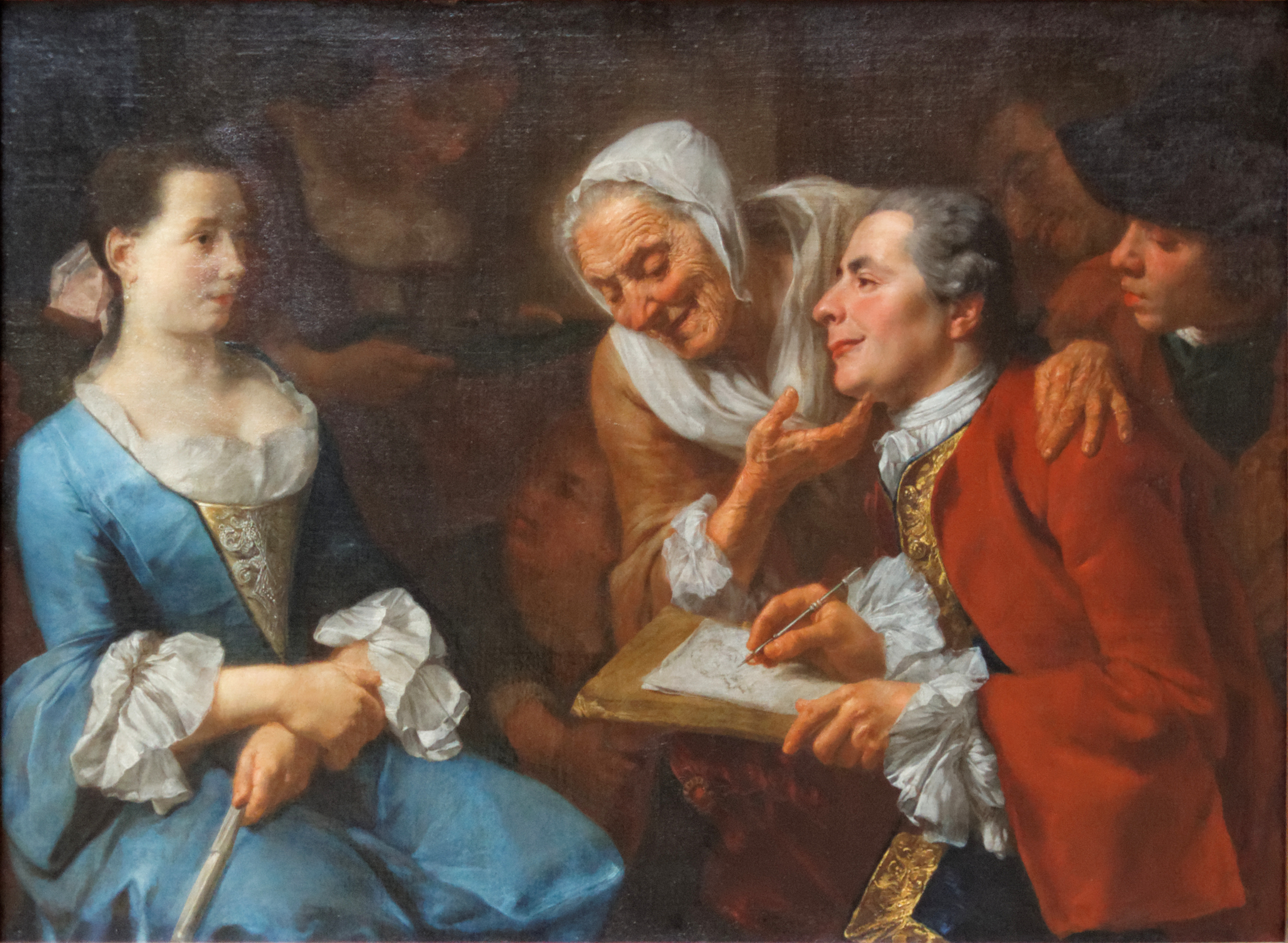
Sitting for Portrait

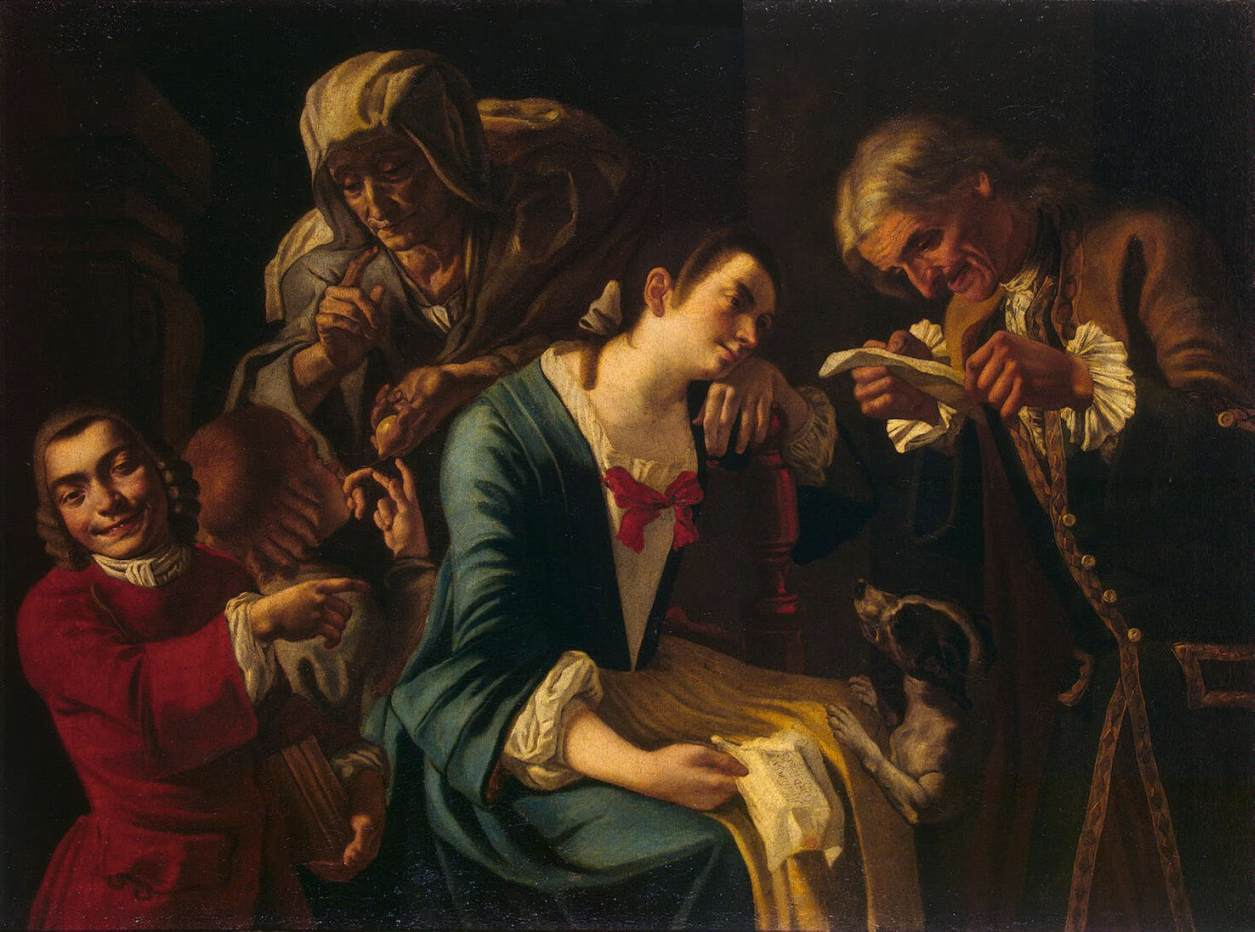
Reading a Letter

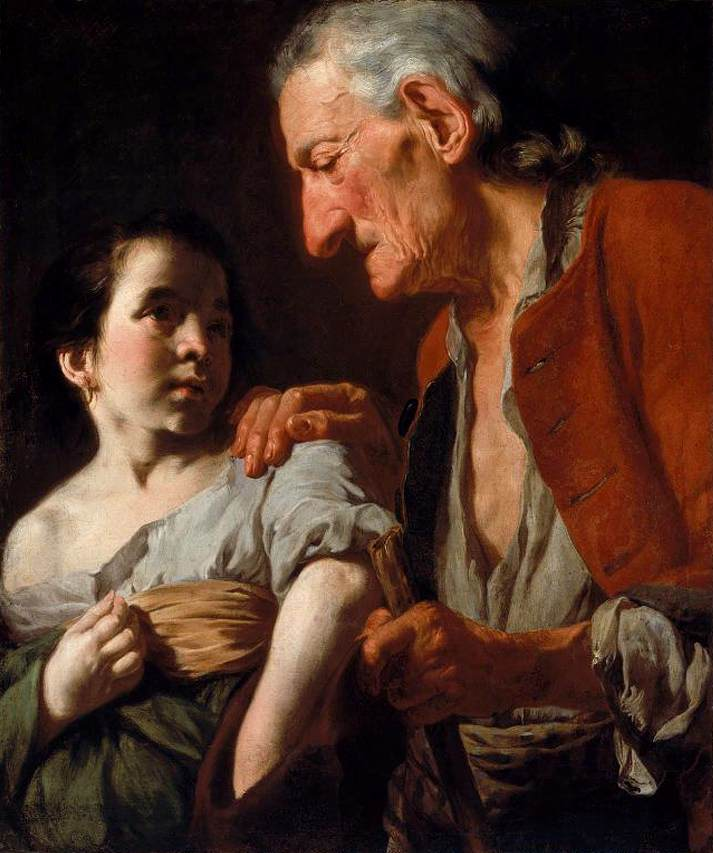
Old beggar with Urchin

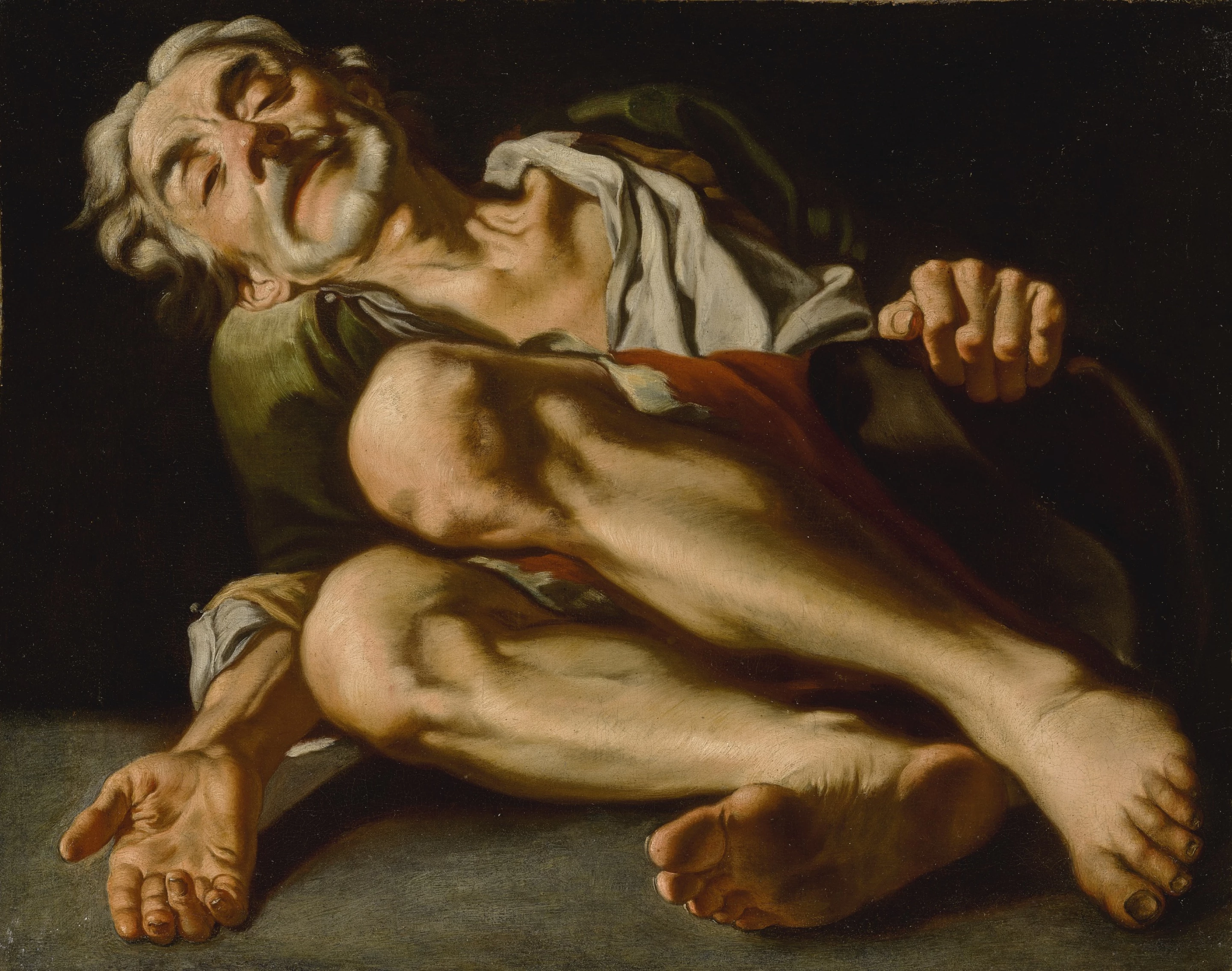
The old beggar

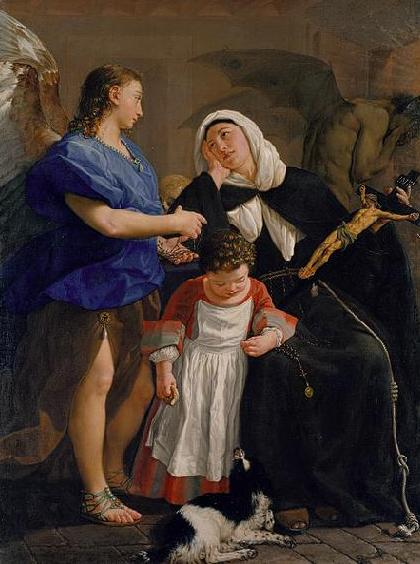
St. Margaret of Cortona

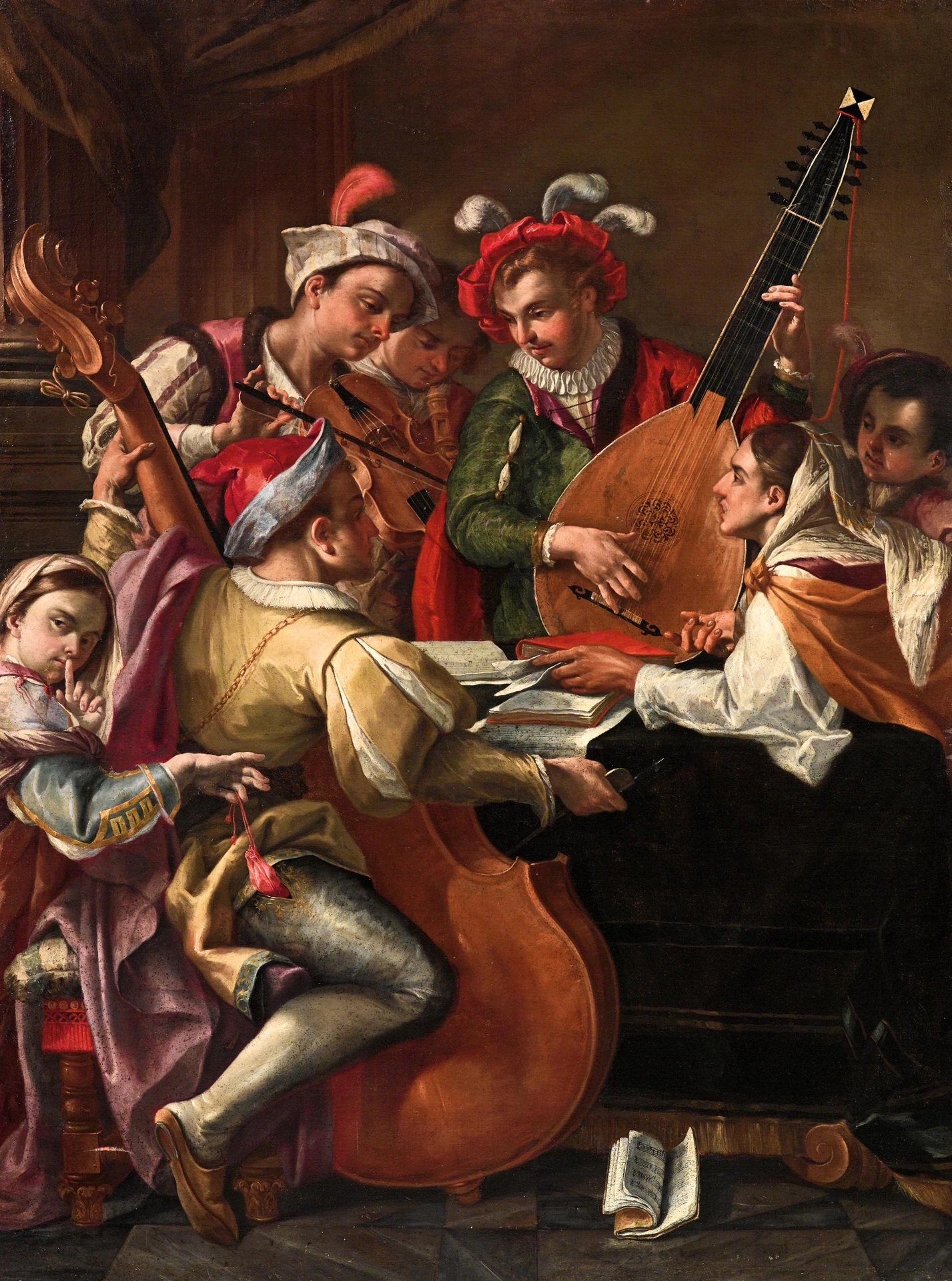
A concert

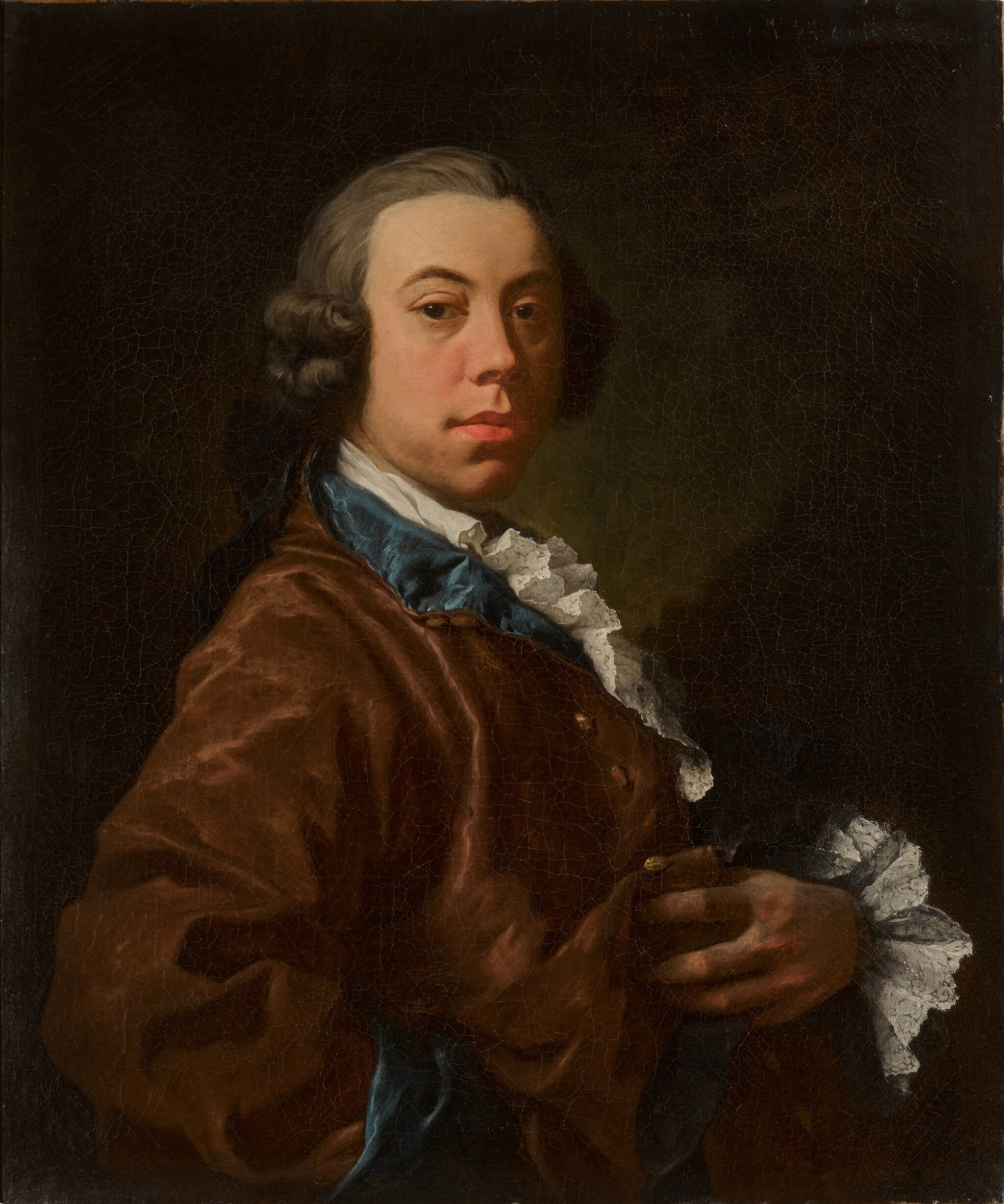
Portrait of Sir Thomas Saunders Sebright

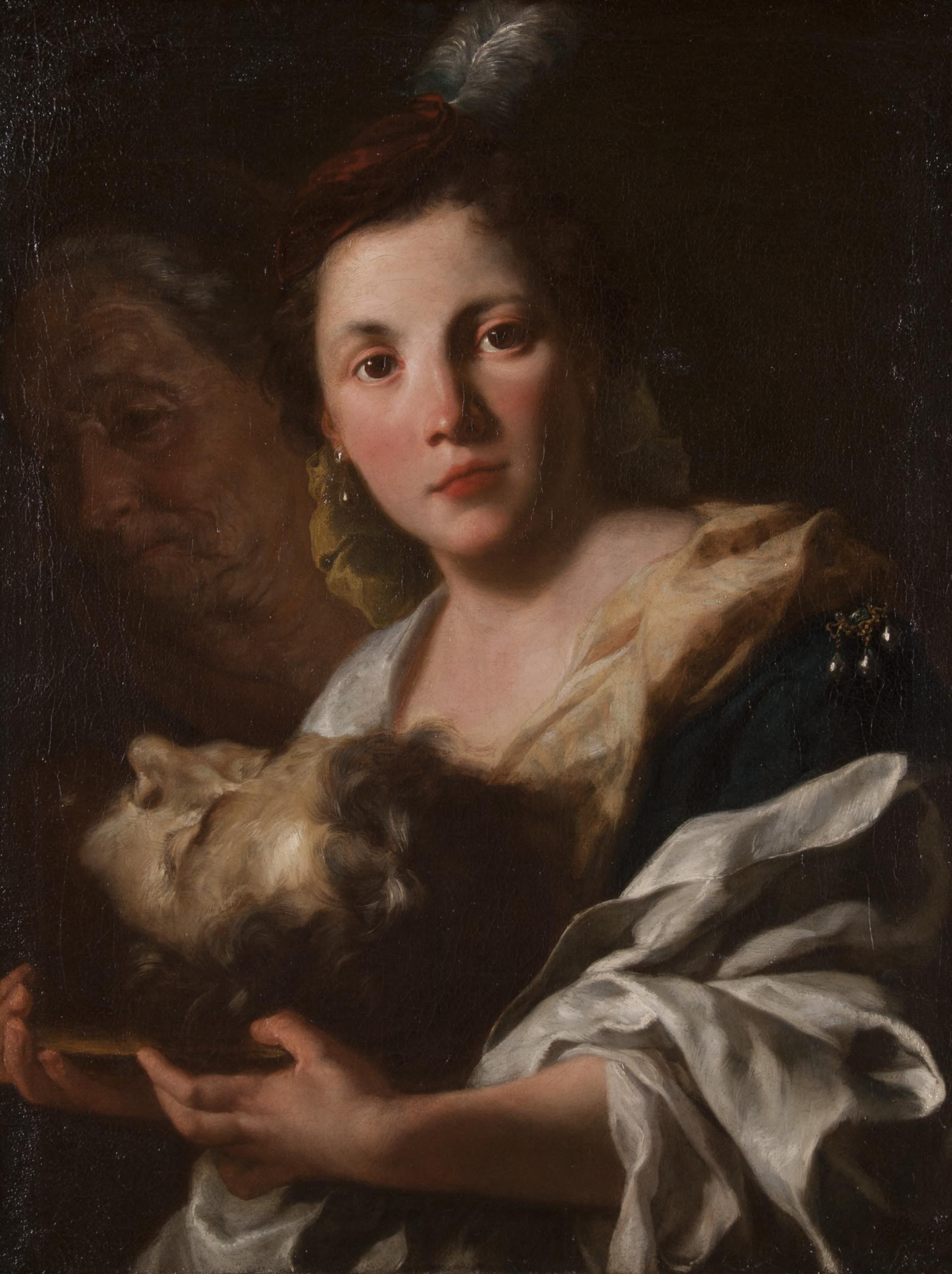
Judith with Head of Holofernes

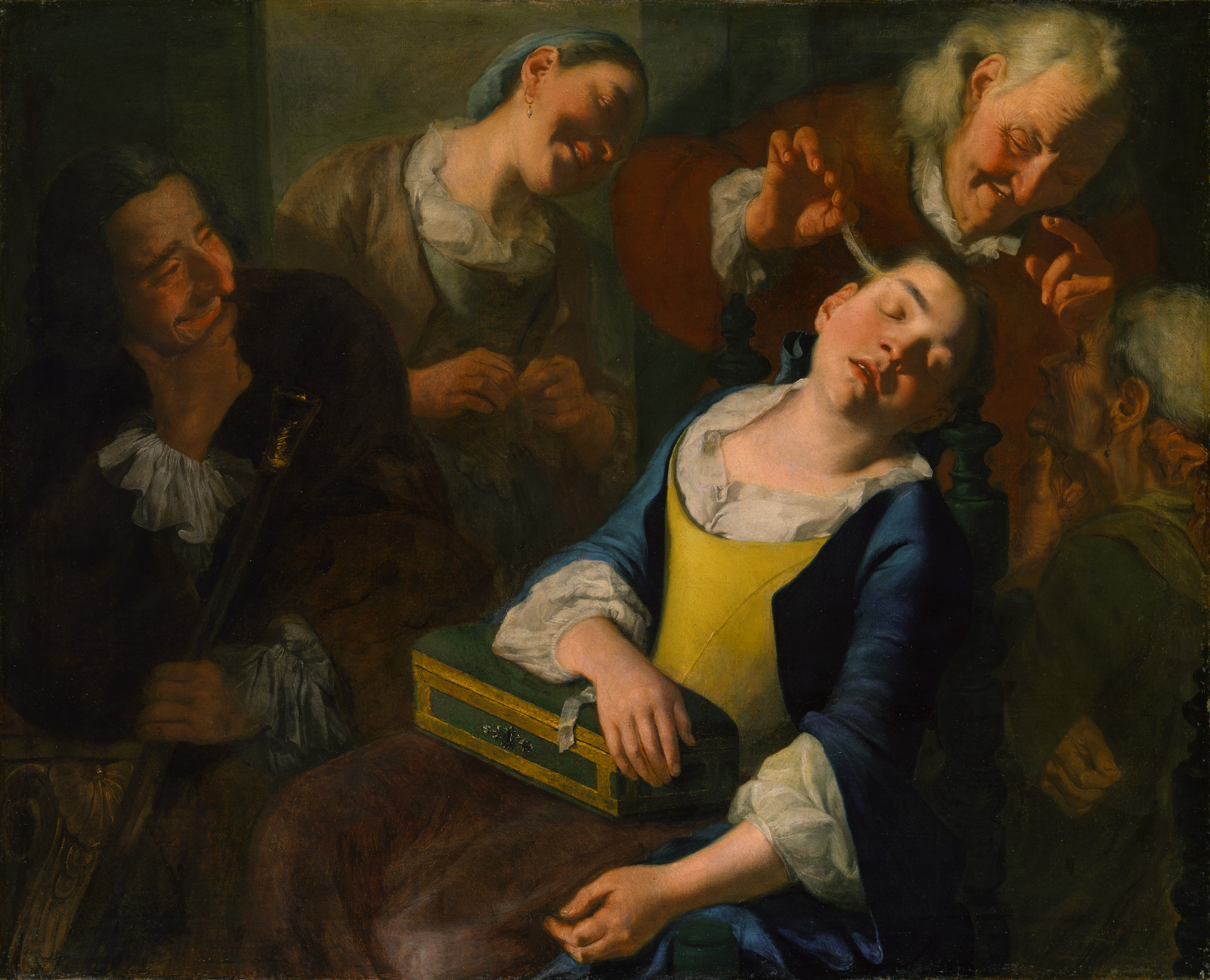
Teasing a Sleeping Girl

== Partial anthology of works ==
Painting	Date	Site	Link
Judith with Head of Holofernes		Private Collection, Milan	
The Seduction		Collezione Luigi Koelliker, Milan	
Old beggar con scugnizzo		Pinacoteca di Brera, Milan	
Portrait of cardinal Gian Giacomo Millo	c. 1753	Private collection, Milan	
The Scribe		Galleria Estense, Modena	
Monaco di Baviera		Private collection, Modena	
Maternal Orgoglio		Private collection, Modena	
Saints Lucia, Agatha & Apollonia		Cathedral, Parma	
Child Jesus before St. Anthony of Padua		Cathedral, Parma	
Saints Pasquale Baylon & Bernardino		Cathedral, Parma	
St. Peter of Alcantara in ecstasy		Cathedral, Parma	
Crucifixion & Franciscan Saints		Cathedral, Parma	
Pentecost		Church of San Pietro d'Alcantara (Parma)	
The concert		Private collection, Parma	
Saint Francis receives stigmata		Santa Maria di Campagna, Piacenza	
Mandola player		Pinacoteca D'Errico, Matera	
Child with wine glass and flask		Pinacoteca D'Errico, Matera	
Music Lesson		Nelson-Atkins Museum of Art, Kansas City	
Design Lesson		Nelson-Atkins Museum, Kansas City	
A fantasy		Fondazione Roberto Longhi, Florence	
Saint Jerome		Private collection Mina Gregori, Florence	
Life of the Virgin		Santa Maria dell’Aiuto, Naples	
Portrait of Cleric		Museo di Capodimonte, Naples	
Musical entertainment		Museo di Capodimonte, Naples	
Brawl during Card Game		Certosa di San Martino, Naples	
The Secret Letter		Museo Pignatelli, Naples	
Musical entertainment		Museo Pignatelli, Naples	
Maternity		Private collection, Naples	
Concert with Mandolin Player		Private collection, Naples	
The fiancee		Private collection, Naples	
The Card Game		Private collection, Naples	
The Marriage Contract		Palazzo Barberini, Rome	
Portrait of Fra Joannethino de Molina		Palazzo Barberini, Rome	
Portrait of Fra’ Raffaello da Lugagnano		Private collection, Rome	
Resurrection of Lazarus		San Paolo fuori le mura, Rome	
Murder during Meal at the House of Absalom (Absalom murders Amnon)	1752	San Paolo fuori le mura, Rome	
La poppata		Private collection, Rome	
Entertainment del pupo		Private collection, Rome	
The couple's dance		Private collection, Rome	
Three Ages of Man		Private collection, Turin	
Stations of the Cross (14 canvases)		Chiesa di San Rocco, Borgotaro	
Mourning over Dead Christ		Museo della Collegiata, Castell’Arquato near Parma (originally church of Convent of Santa Maria di Monte Oliveto)	
Christ mocked		ibid	
Ecce Homo		ibid	.
Posing for Portrait	1754	Louvre, Paris	
Gian Lorenzo Berti	c. 1754–1756	Musée des Beaux-Arts, Strasbourg	
The Laugh	1754		
The Wound	1752	Gallerie dell'Accademia, Venice	
The Surgery		Staatsgalerie Stuttgart	
The Card Party		Musée des Beaux-Arts, Rouen	
The Concert		Musée des Beaux Arts, Rouen	
Self-portrait		Seattle	
Teasing a Sleeping Girl		Metropolitan Museum, New York City	
Saint Margaret of Cortona	c. 1758	Metropolitan Museum, New York City	
Portrait of a Man (attributed)		Metropolitan Museum, New York City	
A Quarrel over a Board Game	c. 1752	Wadsworth Atheneum, Hartford, CT	
