= Saint Peter and Saint Paul (Ribera) =

Painting by Jusepe de Ribera

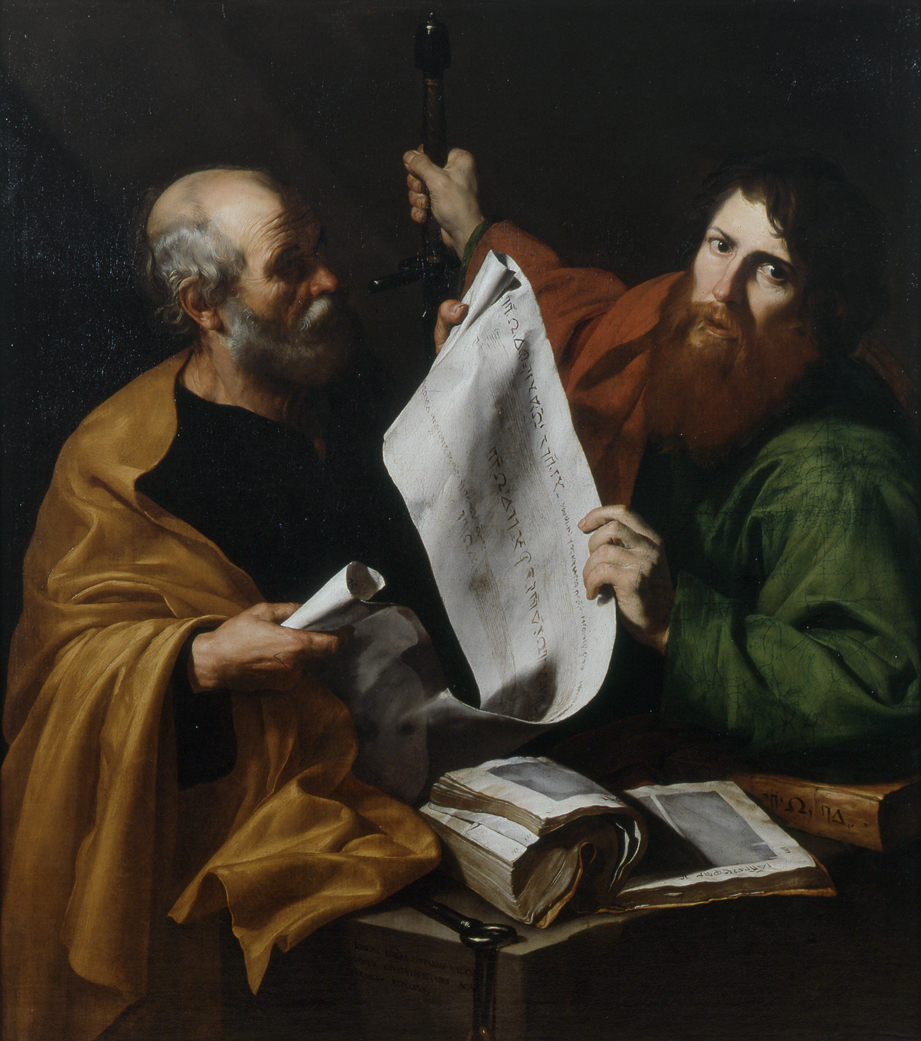
- Artist: Jusepe de Ribera
- Year: c. 1616
- Medium: oil painting on canvas
- Movement: Baroque; Catholic art
- Subject: Saint Peter and Saint Paul
- Dimensions: 126 cm × 112 cm (50 in × 44 in)
- Location: Musée des Beaux-Arts, Strasbourg
- Accession: 1890

Saint Peter and Saint Paul is a circa 1616 Catholic Baroque painting by the Spanish-born Neapolitan artist Jusepe de Ribera. It is on display in the Musée des Beaux-Arts of Strasbourg, France. Its inventory number is 180.

The painting bears a long and explicit signature on the edge of the table: JOSEPHUS RIBERA HISPANUS VALENTINUS CIVITATIS SETABIS ACADEMICUS ROMANUS; i.e. "José Ribera, a Spaniard from the Kingdom of Valencia, the city of Xàtiva, the Academy of Rome". It was bought by the museum in 1890 from the collection of Gustave Rothan; its previous history could be traced back with certitude until 1809, but only speculatively beyond that date. Saint Peter and Saint Paul is influenced by Caravaggism in its naturalistic depiction of the two men, while displaying early Classicism in its solid composition. Ribera reused another canvas to paint over; an upside-down head of a child can still be seen below the parchment in Saint Peter's hand.
