= List of artists in the Web Gallery of Art (L–Z) =

The List of painters in the Web Gallery of Art is a list of the named painters in the Web Gallery of Art (WGA). The online collection contains roughly 34,000 images by 4,000 artists, but only named artists with oil paintings in the database are listed alphabetically here. The painter's name is followed by a title of one of their paintings and its location, which is hosted on the WGA website. For painters with more than one painting in the WGA collection, or for paintings by unnamed or unattributed artists, see the Web Gallery of Art website or the corresponding Wikimedia Commons painter category. Of the 2,463 painters in the WGA database, over a quarter are Italians and about a third were born in the 17th century, and they are mostly men. There are only 44 women, including Sofonisba Anguissola, Rosa Bonheur, Artemisia Gentileschi, Catharina van Hemessen, Angelica Kauffmann, Judith Leyster, Louise Moillon, Clara Peeters, Rachel Ruysch, and Elisabeth Louise Vigée-LeBrun. For the complete list of artists and information about their artworks in the WGA collection, the database can be downloaded as a compressed file from the website.

== L ==
- Charles de La Fosse (1636–1716), 5 paintings : Bacchus and Ariadne, Musée des Beaux-Arts, Dijon (url)
- Laurent de La Hyre (1605–1656), 17 paintings : Abraham Sacrificing Isaac, Musée Saint-Denis, Reims (url)
- Henry Herbert La Thangue (1859–1929), 1 painting : In the Orchard, City Art Gallery and Museum, Bradford (url)
- Georges de La Tour (1593–1652), 26 paintings : Peasant Couple Eating, Staatliche Museen, Berlin (url)
- Adélaïde Labille-Guiard (1749–1803), 2 paintings : Self-Portrait with Two Pupils, Metropolitan Museum of Art, New York (url)
- Pieter van Laer (1592–1642), 5 paintings : The Cake Seller, Galleria Nazionale, Rome (url)
- Jean-Jacques Lagrenée (1739–1821), 2 paintings : Allegory on the Installation of the Museum in the Grande Galerie of the Louvre, Musée du Louvre, Paris (url)
- Louis-Jean-François Lagrenée (1725–1805), 6 paintings : Allegory on the Death of the Dauphin, Musée National du Château, Fontainebleau (url)
- Gerard de Lairesse (1640–1711), 14 paintings : Allegory of the Five Senses, Glasgow Museum, Glasgow (url)
- Jacques de Lajoue (1686–1761), 2 paintings : Scene in a Park, The Hermitage, St. Petersburg (url)
- Jean-Baptiste Lallemand (1716 – c. 1803), 2 paintings : View of the Château de Montmusard, Musée des Beaux-Arts, Dijon (url)
- Georges Lallemant (1575/76–1636), 2 paintings : Adoration of the Magi, The Hermitage, St. Petersburg (url)
- Giulia Lama (c. 1681 – c. 1747), 1 painting : Judith and Holofernes, Gallerie dell'Accademia, Venice (url)
- Johann Baptist von Lampi the Elder (1751–1830), 5 paintings : Portrait of Catherine II with Allegorical Figures of Strength and Truth, The Hermitage, St. Petersburg (url)
- Johann Baptist von Lampi the Younger (1775–1837), 1 painting : Portrait of Antonio Canova, Akademie der bildenden Künste, Vienna (url)
- Nicolas Lancret (1690–1743), 25 paintings : Bathers, Musée des Beaux-Arts, Rouen (url)
- Gaspare Landi (1756–1830), 4 paintings : Self-Portrait, Galleria Borghese, Rome (url)
- Edwin Henry Landseer (1802–1873), 6 paintings : Isaac van Amburgh and his Animals, Royal Collection, Windsor (url)
- Fitz Hugh Lane (1804–1865), 2 paintings : Owl's Head, Penobscot Bay, Maine, Museum of Fine Arts, Boston (url)
- Jean-Louis Laneuville (1748–1826), 1 painting : Portrait of Bertrand Barère de Vieuzac, Neue Pinakothek, Munich (url)
- Giovanni Lanfranco (1582–1647), 15 paintings : St Peter Healing St Agatha, Galleria Nazionale, Parma (url)
- Giovan Battista Langetti (1635–1676), 5 paintings : Cato, The Hermitage, St. Petersburg (url)
- Jérôme-Martin Langlois (1779–1838), 3 paintings : Portrait of Jacques-Louis David, Musée du Louvre, Paris (url)
- Bernardino Lanini (c.1509–after 1581), 1 painting : Triumph of Christ with Angels and Cherubs, Private collection (url)
- George Henry Laporte (1799–1873), 2 paintings : Hunters and Groom in a Paddock, Private collection (url)
- Giovanni de Lorenzo Larciani (1484–1527), 3 paintings : Crucifixion, Musée des Beaux-Arts, Rouen (url)
- Nicolas de Largillière (1656–1746), 18 paintings : The Sculptor Nicolas Coustou in His Atelier, Staatliche Museen, Berlin (url)
- Gustave Lassalle-Bordes (1814–1886), 1 painting : Oriental Scene: The Death of Cleopatra, Private collection (url)
- Pieter Lastman (1583–1633), 12 paintings : Abraham's Journey to Canaan, The Hermitage, St. Petersburg (url)
- Jean-Paul Laurens (1838–1921), 1 painting : The Excommunication of Robert the Pious, Musée d'Orsay, Paris (url)
- Filippo Lauri (1623–1694), 4 paintings : Venus and Adonis, Akademie der bildenden Künste, Vienna (url)
- Pietro Lauri (1634–1669), 1 painting : The Marriage of the Virgin, Private collection (url)
- Thomas Lawrence (1769–1830), 16 paintings : The Two Sons of the 1st Earl of Talbot, Neue Pinakothek, Munich (url)
- Ernest Lawson (1873–1939), 1 painting : Spring Night, Harlem River, Phillips Collection, Washington (url)
- Gregorio Lazzarini (1655–1730), 5 paintings : Doge Morosini Offers the Reconquered Morea to Venice, Palazzo Ducale, Venice (url)
- Charles Le Brun (1619–1690), 20 paintings : Alexander and Porus, Musée du Louvre, Paris (url)
- Louis-Joseph Le Lorrain (1715–1759), 1 painting : Three Figures Dressed for a Masquerade, National Gallery of Art, Washington (url)
- Le Nain (1588–1648), 20 paintings : Four Figures at Table, National Gallery, London (url)
- Jean-Baptiste Le Prince (1734–1781), 4 paintings : Visit to a Palmist, The Hermitage, St. Petersburg (url)
- Eustache Le Sueur (1616–1655), 13 paintings : The Birth of Cupid, Musée du Louvre, Paris (url)
- Jean-Jacques-François Le Barbier (1738–1826), 1 painting : A Female Turkish Bath or Hammam, Private collection (url)
- Albert Lebourg (1849–1928), 2 paintings : Road on the Banks of the Seine at Neuilly inn Winter, Musée d'Orsay, Paris (url)
- Jean LeClerc (1587–1633), 1 painting : Doge Enrico Dandolo Recruiting for the Crusade, Palazzo Ducale, Venice (url)
- Hippolyte Lecomte (1781–1857), 1 painting : Meeting of Napoleon with the Ambassadors of the Austrian Emperor near Leoben, Steiermark on 7 April 1797, The Hermitage, St. Petersburg (url)
- Blas de Ledesma (1602–1614), 1 painting : Basket of Cherries and Flowers, High Museum of Art, Atlanta (url)
- Willem van Leen (1753–1825), 3 paintings : Flowers in a Blue Vase, Metropolitan Museum of Art, New York (url)
- Claude Lefebvre (1632–1672), 2 paintings : Portrait of Jean-Baptiste Colbert, Château de Versailles, Versailles (url)
- Robert Lefèvre (1755–1830), 5 paintings : Princess Pauline Borghese, Château de Versailles et de Trianon, Versailles (url)
- Silvestro Lega (1826–1895), 5 paintings : A Walk in the Garden, Galleria dell'Arte Moderna, Palazzo Pitti, Florence (url)
- Alphonse Legros (1837–1911), 3 paintings : The Shrine, Musée des Beaux-Arts, Dijon (url)
- Henri Lehmann (1814–1882), 2 paintings : St Catherine of Alexandria, Musée Fabre, Montpellier (url)
- Wilhelm Leibl (1844–1900), 5 paintings : Frau Wilhelmine Gedon, Neue Pinakothek, Munich (url)
- Felix Ivo Leicher (1727–1812), 3 paintings : Saint Joseph Calasantius before the Virgin, Kuny Domonkos Museum, Tata (url)
- Charles Leickert (1816–1907), 1 painting : Urban Landscape, The Hermitage, St. Petersburg (url)
- Walter Leistikow (1855–1908), 1 painting : Lake Grunewald, Nationalgalerie, Berlin (url)
- Adriaan de Lelie (1755–1820), 2 paintings : The Art Gallery of Jan Gildemeester, Rijksmuseum, Amsterdam (url)
- Peter Lely (1618–1680), 7 paintings : Two Ladies of the Lake Family, Tate Gallery, London (url)
- Georg Lemberger (1490/95-1540), 1 painting : St George Freeing the Princess, Galleria degli Uffizi, Florence (url)
- Georges Lemmen (1865–1916), 3 paintings : Beach at Heist, Musée d'Orsay, Paris (url)
- Marie-Victoire Lemoine (1754–1820), 3 paintings : The Interior of an Atelier of a Woman Painter, Metropolitan Museum of Art, New York (url)
- Anicet Charles Gabriel Lemonnier (1743–1824), 3 paintings : Apollo and Diana Attacking Niobe and her Children, Musée des Beaux-Arts, Rouen (url)
- François Lemoyne (1688–1737), 6 paintings : The Apotheosis of Hercules, Musée National du Château, Versailles (url)
- Franz von Lenbach (1836–1904), 2 paintings : Portrait of Wilhelm Busch, The Hermitage, St. Petersburg (url)
- Andries Cornelis Lens (1739–1822), 2 paintings : Hercules Protects Painting from Ignorance and Envy, Koninklijk Museum voor Schone Kunsten, Antwerp (url)
- Leonardo da Pistoia (ca. 1483-after 1518), 1 painting : The Holy Family with the Infant St John, Private collection (url)
- Leonardo da Vinci (1452–1519), 47 paintings : The Baptism of Christ (detail), Galleria degli Uffizi, Florence (url)
- Ottavio Leoni (1578–1630), 1 painting : Portrait of a Lady, Private collection (url)
- Nicolas-Bernard Lépicié (1735–1784), 3 paintings : The Calvary Chapel of the Church Saint-Roch, Musée des Beaux-Arts, Pau (url)
- Stanislas Lépine (1835–1892), 2 paintings : Pont des Arts, Paris, Private collection (url)
- Henry Lerolle (1848–1929), 3 paintings : The Organ Rehearsal, Metropolitan Museum of Art, New York (url)
- Karl Friedrich Lessing (1808–1880), 1 painting : Royal Couple Mourning for their Dead Daughter, The Hermitage, St. Petersburg (url)
- Jacques de L'Estin (1597–1661), 1 painting : Self-portrait, Musée des Beaux-Arts, Troyes (url)
- Guillaume Guillon-Lethière (1760–1832), 2 paintings : Death of Cato of Utica, The Hermitage, St. Petersburg (url)
- Emanuel Leutze (1816–1868), 1 painting : Washington Crossing the Delaware, Metropolitan Museum of Art, New York (url)
- Jacob Levecq (1634–1675), 1 painting : Young Man at a Writing Desk, Private collection (url)
- Isaak Levitan (1860–1900), 2 paintings : Birch Grove, State Tretyakov Gallery, Moscow (url)
- Dmitry Grigorevich Levitsky (1735–1822), 6 paintings : Portrait of the Princesses Davidova and Rzevskaja, State Russian Museum, St. Petersburg (url)
- Aertgen van Leyden (1498–1564), 2 paintings : Church Sermon, Rijksmuseum, Amsterdam (url)
- Lucas van Leyden (1494–1533), 20 paintings : The Game of Chess, Staatliche Museen, Berlin (url)
- Paul Carl Leygebe (1664–1730), 1 painting : Tabakskollegium of Frederick I, Neues Palais, Potsdam (url)
- Henri Leys (1815–1869), 4 paintings : Frans Floris Going to a Saint Luke's Day Feast 1540, Wallace Collection, London (url)
- Judith Leyster (1609–1660), 8 paintings : Carousing Couple, Musée du Louvre, Paris (url)
- Gijsbrecht Leytens (1586–1657), 2 paintings : Winter Landscape, Národní Galerie, Prague (url)
- Gottfried Libalt (c. 1610 – 1666), 1 painting : Still-Life with Game-Birds, Szépmûvészeti Múzeum, Budapest (url)
- Liberale da Verona (c. 1445 – c. 1526), 2 paintings : St Sebastian, Pinacoteca di Brera, Milan (url)
- Marco Liberi (1640–1725), 1 painting : Jupiter and Mnemosyne, Szépmûvészeti Múzeum, Budapest (url)
- Pietro Liberi (1605–1687), 6 paintings : Antiquity Scene, National Gallery of Slovenia, Ljubljana (url)
- Bernardino Licinio (c. 1489 – c. 1565), 8 paintings : Family Portrait, The Hermitage, St. Petersburg (url)
- Max Liebermann (1847–1935), 19 paintings : Plucking Geese, Nationalgalerie, Berlin (url)
- Josse Lieferinxe (1493–1508), 3 paintings : Pilgrims at the Tomb of St Sebastian, Galleria Nazionale d'Arte Antica, Rome (url)
- Jozef Hubert Lies (1821–1865), 1 painting : Scene in a Park, The Hermitage, St. Petersburg (url)
- Jan Lievens (1607–1674), 12 paintings : Portrait of a Girl, Szépmûvészeti Múzeum, Budapest (url)
- Sándor Liezen-Mayer (1839–1898), 6 paintings : Queens Elisabeth and Mary at the Tomb of King Lajos the Great in 1385, Magyar Nemzeti Galéria, Budapest (url)
- Pietro Ligari (1686–1752), 1 painting : Portrait of the Artist's Father, Pinacoteca di Brera, Milan (url)
- Antal Ligeti (1823–1890), 4 paintings : Oasis in the Desert, Magyar Nemzeti Galéria, Budapest (url)
- Jacopo Ligozzi (1547–1627), 4 paintings : Sacrifice of Isaac, Galleria degli Uffizi, Florence (url)
- Jacques Linard (c. 1600 – 1645), 5 paintings : Basket of Flowers, Musée du Louvre, Paris (url)
- Johannes Lingelbach (1622–1674), 7 paintings : Bathing Gypsies, Öffentliche Kunstsammlung, Basel (url)
- Hendrik Frans van Lint (1684–1763), 4 paintings : Classical Landscape, Private collection (url)
- Pieter van Lint (1609–1690), 3 paintings : Jephthae's Daughter, The Hermitage, St. Petersburg (url)
- Angelo Lion (1597–1621), 1 painting : St Dominic and St Francis, Basilica dei Santi Giovanni e Paolo, Venice (url)
- Jean-Étienne Liotard (1702–1789), 2 paintings : Marie-Adalaide of France Dressed in Turkish Costume, Galleria degli Uffizi, Florence (url)
- Ludovico Lipparini (1800–1856), 1 painting : Portrait of Count Leopoldo Cicognara, Gallerie dell'Accademia, Venice (url)
- Filippino Lippi (1457–1504), 17 paintings : Adoration of the Child, The Hermitage, St. Petersburg (url)
- Filippo Lippi (1406–1469), 14 paintings : Annunciation with two Kneeling Donors, Galleria Nazionale d'Arte Antica, Rome (url)
- Lorenzo Lippi (1606–1665), 1 painting : Lot and his Daughters, Galleria degli Uffizi, Florence (url)
- Pieter Lisaert (III) (1574–1624), 1 painting : Madonna and Child with God the Father, the Holy Spirit and Adoring Angels, Private collection (url)
- Anna Dorothea Lisiewska (1721–1782), 4 paintings : Self-Portrait, Staatliche Museen, Berlin (url)
- Anna Rosina Lisiewska (1716–1783), 1 painting : Allegory of Hearing, Private collection (url)
- Johann Liss (1590–1629), 9 paintings : Adam and Eve Mourning for Abel, Gallerie dell'Accademia, Venice (url)
- Dirck van der Lisse (1607–1669), 3 paintings : Blind Man's Buff, Staatliche Slösser und Gärten, Jagdschloss Grunewald, Berlin (url)
- Hernando de los Llanos (fl.1506–1525), 3 paintings : Death and Assumption of the Virgin, Cathedral, Valencia (url) "Fernando" is incorrect.
- Alejandro de Loarte (c. 1597 – 1626), 1 painting : Still-Life, Private collection (url)
- Andrea Locatelli (1695–1741), 6 paintings : Market in the Piazza Navona in Rome, Akademie der bildenden Künste, Vienna (url)
- Stefan Lochner (c. 1400 – 1451), 3 paintings : Martyrdom of the Apostles Altarpiece (interior left wing), Städelsches Kunstinstitut, Frankfurt (url)
- Gustave Loiseau (1865–1935), 4 paintings : Banks of the Seine, Private collection (url)
- Gian Paolo Lomazzo (1538–1600), 2 paintings : Self-Portrait, Kunsthistorisches Museum, Vienna (url)
- Lambert Lombard (1505–1566), 5 paintings : The Miracle of the Loaves and Fishes, Rockox House, Antwerp (url)
- Giovanni Domenico Lombardi (1682–1751), 2 paintings : Concert with Two Singers, Private collection (url)
- Alessandro Longhi (1733–1813), 6 paintings : Painting and Merit, Gallerie dell'Accademia, Venice (url)
- Barbara Longhi (1552–1638), 2 paintings : St Catherine of Alexandria, Museo d'Arte della Città, Ravenna (url)
- Pietro Longhi (1702–1783), 33 paintings : The Concert, Gallerie dell'Accademia, Venice (url)
- Charles-André van Loo (1705–1765), 9 paintings : Aeneas Carrying Anchises, Musée du Louvre, Paris (url)
- César van Loo (1743–1821), 1 painting : Marquis d'Ossun, National Gallery of Art, Washington (url)
- Charles-Amédée-Philippe van Loo (1719–1795), 2 paintings : The Camera Obscura, National Gallery of Art, Washington (url)
- Jacob van Loo (1614–1670), 4 paintings : Concert, The Hermitage, St. Petersburg (url)
- Jean-Baptiste van Loo (1684–1745), 1 painting : Triumph of Galatea, The Hermitage, St. Petersburg (url)
- Louis-Michel van Loo (1707–1771), 6 paintings : The Artist with a Portrait of his Father, Musée National du Château, Versailles (url)
- Theodoor van Loon (1581–1649), 4 paintings : The Adoration of the Magi, Liechtenstein Museum, Vienna (url)
- Friedrich Loos (1797–1890), 2 paintings : The Rudolfskai in Salzburg, Residenzgalerie, Salzburg (url)
- Cristovano Lopes (c. 1516 – 1570), 2 paintings : Portrait of Queen Catherine of Austria, Museu Nacional de Arte Antiga, Lisbon (url)
- Bernardo López Piquer (1801–1874), 1 painting : Queen Maria Isabel de Braganza, Museo del Prado, Madrid (url)
- Luis López Piquer (1802–1865), 3 paintings : The Goddess Juno in the House of Dreams, Museo del Prado, Madrid (url)
- Vicente López y Portaña (1772–1850), 5 paintings : Portrait of Don Juan Francisco Ximénez del Rio, Archbishop of Valencia, Museo de Bellas Artes, Bilbao (url)
- Lorenzo da Viterbo (c. 1444 – 1472), 1 painting : Madonna Enthroned with the Infant Christ, St Peter and St Michael, Galleria Nazionale d'Arte Antica, Rome (url)
- Lorenzo di Credi (1459–1537), 7 paintings : Madonna and Child with a Pomegranate, National Gallery of Art, Washington (url)
- Lorenzo di Niccolò di Martino (1392–1412), 1 painting : Madonna and Child, The Hermitage, St. Petersburg (url)
- Lorenzo Monaco (1370–1423), 1 painting : St Peter, Private collection (url)
- Lorenzo Veneziano (1356–1372), 1 painting : Christ Giving the Keys to St Peter, Museo Correr, Venice (url)
- Anthonie de Lorme (1610–1673), 2 paintings : Interior of the St Laurenskerk in Rotterdam, National Gallery of Ireland, Dublin (url)
- Johann Carl Loth (1632–1698), 7 paintings : Apollo, Pan, and Marsyas, Staatliche Museen, Berlin (url)
- Lorenzo Lotto (1480–1556), 120 paintings : Madonna and Child with Sts Peter, Christine, Liberale, and Jerome, Santa Cristina al Tiverone, Treviso (url)
- Károly Lotz (1833–1904), 6 paintings : Stud in a Thunderstorm, Magyar Nemzeti Galéria, Budapest (url)
- Philip James de Loutherbourg (1740–1812), 8 paintings : Clair de Lune (Moonlight), Musée des Beaux-Arts, Strasbourg (url)
- Eugenio Lucas Velázquez (1817–1870), 1 painting : The Defence of Saragossa, Wallraf-Richartz-Museum, Cologne (url)
- Lucas Luce (1575–1661), 1 painting : Still-Life, Private collection (url)
- Maximilien Luce (1858–1941), 6 paintings : Paris Seen from Montmartre, Musée du Petit Palais, Geneva (url)
- Stefan Luchian (1868–1916), 2 paintings : Anemones, Muzeul National de Arta, Bucharest (url)
- Bernardino Luini (1480–1532), 18 paintings : Saint Catherine, The Hermitage, St. Petersburg (url)
- Thomas Luny (1759–1837), 2 paintings : Engagement between Sir George Brydges Rodney and the Spanish Squadron, Private collection (url)
- Benedetto Luti (1666–1724), 1 painting : Boy with a Flute, The Hermitage, St. Petersburg (url)
- Simon Luttichuys (1610–1661), 6 paintings : Breakfast with Ham, The Hermitage, St. Petersburg (url)
- Carstian Luyckx (1623–1675), 4 paintings : Still-Life, Private collection (url)
- Frans Luycx (1604–1668), 1 painting : Annunciation, Národní Galerie, Prague (url)

== M ==
- Dirk Maas (1659–1717), 1 painting : Cavalry Encounter, The Hermitage, St. Petersburg (url)
- Girolamo Macchietti (1535–1592), 2 paintings : Portrait of Bianca Cappello, Museo Nazionale di Palazzo Mansi, Lucca (url)
- Pedro Machuca (1490/95–1550), 2 paintings : Deposition, Museo del Prado, Madrid (url)
- Pierre-Antoine Demachy or "de Machy" (1723–1807), 4 paintings : Clearing the Area in front of the Louvre Colonnade, Musée Carnavalet, Paris (url)
- Daniel Maclise (1806–1870), 2 paintings : A Scene from 'Undine', Royal Collection, Windsor (url)
- William McTaggart (1835–1910), 1 painting : The Storm, National Gallery of Scotland, Edinburgh (url)
- Viktor Madarász (1830–1917), 5 paintings : Felicián Zách, Magyar Nemzeti Galéria, Budapest (url)
- Jean-Baptiste Madou (1796–1877), 1 painting : Study, The Hermitage, St. Petersburg (url)
- Mariano Salvador Maella (1739–1818), 2 paintings : Immaculate Conception, Museo del Prado, Madrid (url)
- Nicolaes Maes (1634–1693), 28 paintings : Abraham Dismissing Hagar and Ishmael, Metropolitan Museum of Art, New York (url)
- Michelangelo Maestri (c. 1779 – 1812), 1 painting : Hebe or Juventas, Private collection (url)
- Francesco Maffei (c. 1600 – 1660), 5 paintings : Mythological Scene, Gallerie dell'Accademia, Venice (url)
- Domenico Maggiotto (1712–1794), 1 painting : Boy with Flute, Museo del Settecento Veneziano, Ca' Rezzonico, Venice (url)
- Carlo Magini (1720–1806), 2 paintings : Still-Life with Ham, Private collection (url)
- Alessandro Magnasco (1667–1749), 19 paintings : Bacchanalian Scene, The Hermitage, St. Petersburg (url)
- Bastiano Mainardi (1466–1513), 1 painting : Madonna with Child, the Young St John and Two Angels, Liechtenstein Museum, Vienna (url)
- Gian Francesco de' Maineri (d1505), 1 painting : Christ Carrying the Cross, The Hermitage, St. Petersburg (url)
- Juan Bautista Mayno (1475–1536), 4 paintings : Adoration of the Shepherds, Museo del Prado, Madrid (url)
- Paul Fordyce Maitland (1863–1909), 1 painting : Flower Walk, Kensington Gardens, Tate Gallery, London (url)
- Hans Makart (1840–1884), 2 paintings : Likeness of his First Wife Amalie, Residenzgalerie, Salzburg (url)
- Hans Maler zu Schwaz (active-15101523), 1 painting : Queen Anne of Hungary and Bohemia, Museo Thyssen-Bornemisza, Madrid (url)
- Gabriel Mälesskircher (c. 1425 – 1495), 1 painting : St Luke, Museo Thyssen-Bornemisza, Madrid (url)
- Nicola Malinconico (c. 1663 – 1721), 3 paintings : Decorative Still-Life, Akademie der bildenden Künste, Vienna (url)
- Jean-Baptiste Mallet (1759–1835), 3 paintings : Gothic Bathroom, Château-Musée, Dieppe (url)
- Pietro Malombra (1556–1618), 1 painting : Samson and Delilah, Private collection (url)
- Jean Malouel (1365–1419), 1 painting : Calvary and the Martyrdom of St Denis, Musée du Louvre, Paris (url)
- Francesco Maltese (1611–1654), 2 paintings : Still-Life with Oriental Carpet, The Hermitage, St. Petersburg (url)
- Cornelis de Man (1621–1706), 8 paintings : The Chess Players, Szépmûvészeti Múzeum, Budapest (url)
- Francesco Mancini (1679–1758) (1679–1758), 1 painting : Rest during the Flight to Egypt, Pinacoteca, Vatican (url)
- Karel van Mander (1548–1606), 3 paintings : Garden of Love, The Hermitage, St. Petersburg (url)
- Jan Mandijn (1500–1560), 1 painting : Landscape with the Legend of St Christopher, The Hermitage, St. Petersburg (url)
- Édouard Manet (1832–1883), 97 paintings : Boy with Cherries, Museu Calouste Gulbenkian, Lisbon (url)
- Rutilio di Lorenzo Manetti (1571–1639), 4 paintings : Madonna and Child with the Infant St John the Baptist and St Catherine of Siena, Yale University Art Gallery, New Haven (url)
- Bartolomeo Manfredi (1582–1622), 9 paintings : Allegory of the Four Seasons, Dayton Art Institute, Dayton (url)
- Adrien Manglard (1695–1760), 5 paintings : View of a Southern Port, Akademie der bildenden Künste, Vienna (url)
- Giovanni di Niccolò Mansueti (1485–1526), 2 paintings : St Jerome in the Desert, Accademia Carrara, Bergamo (url)
- Andrea Mantegna (1430–1506), 6 paintings : Christ Welcoming the Virgin in Heaven, Pinacoteca Nazionale, Ferrara (url)
- Ádám Mányoki (1673–1757), 3 paintings : Self-portrait, Magyar Nemzeti Galéria, Budapest (url)
- Jakab Marastoni (1804–1860), 3 paintings : Portrait of Ferenc Friedrich, Historical Picture Gallery, Hungarian National Museum, Budapest (url)
- Carlo Maratta (1625–1713), 11 paintings : Adoration of the Magi (in Garland), The Hermitage, St. Petersburg (url)
- Alessandro Marchesini (1663–1738), 1 painting : Dedication of a New Vestal Virgin, The Hermitage, St. Petersburg (url)
- Ludovico Marchetti (1853–1909), 2 paintings : Bacci Ball, Private collection (url)
- Rocco Marconi (died 1529), 2 paintings : Christ and the Adulteress, Gallerie dell'Accademia, Venice (url)
- Georg Des Marées (1697–1776), 1 painting : Portrait of Maria Rosa Walburga von Soyer, Museo Thyssen-Bornemisza, Madrid (url)
- Hans von Marées (1837–1887), 4 paintings : Courtyard with the Grotto in the Munich Royal Residence, The Hermitage, St. Petersburg (url)
- Michele Marieschi (1710–1743), 15 paintings : The Grand Canal with the Ca' Rezzonico and the Campo San Samuele, Staatliche Museen, Berlin (url)
- Prosper Marilhat (1811–1847), 1 painting : Ezbekiyah Street in Cairo, The Hermitage, St. Petersburg (url)
- Onorio Marinari (1627–1715), 1 painting : Salome with the Head of the Baptist, Szépmûvészeti Múzeum, Budapest (url)
- Mario Dei Fiori (1603–1673), 3 paintings : Mirror with Three Putti, Galleria Colonna, Rome (url)
- Jacob Maris (1837–1899), 1 painting : Allotment Gardens near The Hague, Haags Gemeentemuseum, The Hague (url)
- Matthijs Maris (1839–1917), 1 painting : Quarry at Montmartre, Haags Gemeentemuseum, The Hague (url)
- Willem Maris (1844–1910), 1 painting : Dusk, Centraal Museum, Utrecht (url)
- András Markó (1824–1895), 4 paintings : Landscape with Charcoal Burners, Galleria Palatina (Palazzo Pitti), Florence (url)
- Ferenc Markó (1832–1874), 3 paintings : Harvesting Watermelons, Private collection (url)
- Károly Markó the Elder (1791–1860), 11 paintings : Visegrád, Magyar Nemzeti Galéria, Budapest (url)
- Károly Markó the Younger (1822–1891), 5 paintings : View of the Lake Trasimeno, Private collection (url)
- William Marlow (1740–1813), 2 paintings : View of the Bay of Naples from Posillipo, Private collection (url)
- Simon Marmion (1420–1489), 1 painting : Virgin and the Man of Sorrow, Groeninge Museum, Bruges (url)
- Anton von Maron (1733–1808), 3 paintings : Portrait of Emperor Joseph II, Private collection (url)
- Otto Marseus van Schrieck (1619–1678), 6 paintings : Still-Life with Insects and Amphibians, Herzog Anton Ulrich-Museum, Braunschweig (url)
- Benjamin Marshall (1768–1835), 3 paintings : Portrait of Daniel Lambert, Newarke Houses Museum, The Newarke, Leicester (url)
- David Martin (1737–1798), 3 paintings : Portrait of Benjamin Franklin, White House, Washington (url)
- Henri-Jean Guillaume Martin (1860–1943), 1 painting : The Harbour of Collioure, Private collection (url)
- Jean-Baptiste Martin (1659–1735), 3 paintings : View of the Orangerie (detail), Salon, Grand Trianon, Versailles (url)
- John Martin (painter) (1789–1854), 4 paintings : The Bard, Yale Center for British Art, New Haven (url)
- Pierre-Denis Martin (c. 1663 – 1742), 2 paintings : View of the Château of Marly, Musée National du Château, Versailles (url)
- Giovanni Martinelli (c. 1600 – 1659), 2 paintings : Memento Mori, Private collection (url)
- Jusepe Martínez (1600–1682), 1 painting : Apostle St Thomas, Szépmûvészeti Múzeum, Budapest (url)
- Jan Martszen de Jonge (1609–1647), 1 painting : Battle Scene, Victoria and Albert Museum, London (url)
- Vicente Masip (c. 1475 – 1550), 1 painting : Martyrdom of St Agnes, Museo del Prado, Madrid (url)
- Firmin Massot (1766–1849), 1 painting : Portrait of the Empress Josephine of France, Private collection (url)
- Cornelis Massijs (1510–1557), 2 paintings : Crucifixion, Rockox House, Antwerp (url)
- Jan Matsys (1510–1575), 9 paintings : David and Bathsheba, Musée du Louvre, Paris (url)
- Quentin Matsys (1466–1530), 36 paintings : St Anne Altarpiece, Royal Museums of Fine Arts of Belgium, Brussels (url)
- Mastelletta (1575–1655), 1 painting : Landscape with the Good Samaritan, Private collection (url)
- Master Bertram (died 1415), 1 painting : Triptych: The Holy Visage of Christ, Museo Thyssen-Bornemisza, Madrid (url)
- Master of Ab Monogram (active 1530s-), 6 paintings : The Annunciation, Gemäldegalerie, Dresden (url)
- Master of Alkmaar (1475–1515), 2 paintings : The Seven Works of Mercy, Rijksmuseum, Amsterdam (url)
- Master of Ávila (active last quarter of 15th century), 1 painting : Nativity, Museo Lázaro Galdiano, Madrid (url)
- Master of the Female Half-Lengths (1530–1540), 6 paintings : St Catherine, Pinacoteca di Brera, Milan (url)
- Master of Flémalle (1375–1444), 40 paintings : Blessing Christ and Praying Virgin, Philadelphia Museum of Art, Philadelphia (url)
- Master of Flora (1555–1570), 1 painting : The Triumph of Flora, Private collection, Vicenza (url)
- Master of Hoogstraeten (1475–1530), 3 paintings : Adoration of the Magi, Museum Mayer van den Bergh, Antwerp (url)
- Master of Moulins (1471–1500), 2 paintings : The Annunciation, Art Institute, Chicago (url)
- Master of Saint Giles (active c. 1490 – 1510), 4 paintings : St Gilles and the Hind, National Gallery, London (url)
- Master of the Acquavella Still-Life (1610–1620), 1 painting : Still-Life with a Violinist, Private collection (url)
- Master of the Aix Annunciation (active in 1440s-), 3 paintings : Annunciation, Sainte-Marie-Madeleine, Aix-en-Provence (url)
- Master of the Castello Nativity (1445–1475), 2 paintings : Madonna and Child, Niedersächsisches Landesmuseum, Hannover (url)
- Master of the Catholic Kings (1485–1500), 3 paintings : The Marriage at Cana, National Gallery of Art, Washington (url)
- Master of the Fontainebleau School (end of the 16th century-), 11 paintings : Mythological Allegory, Musée du Louvre, Paris (url)
- Master of the Hartford Still-Life (active born c. 1600), 4 paintings : A Table Laden with Flowers and Fruit, Wadsworth Atheneum, Hartford (url)
- Master of the Holy Blood (1530–1535), 3 paintings : Virgin and Child with St Catherine and St Barbara, Groeninge Museum, Bruges (url)
- Master of the Holy Kinship (1480–1518), 2 paintings : The Adoration of the Magi, Private collection (url)
- Master of the legend of St Barbara (1470–1500), 1 painting : St Ursula Protecting the Eleven Thousand Virgins with Her Cloak, Private collection (url)
- Master of the Legend of Saint Lucy (1480–1510), 7 paintings : Legend of St Lucy, Sint-Jacobskerk, Bruges (url)
- Master of the Legend of St. Ursula (Bruges) (1436–1505), 12 paintings : Legend of St Ursula, the Church and the Synagogue, Groeninge Museum, Bruges (url)
- Master of the Lille Adoration (1510–1530), 5 paintings : Adoration of Shepherds, Musée des Beaux-Arts, Lille (url)
- Master with the Parrot (1525–1550), 2 paintings : Mary Magdalen, Private collection (url)
- Master of the Saint Bartholomew Altarpiece (1465–1510), 1 painting : The Deposition, National Gallery, London (url)
- Master of the Story of Griselda (active 1490s), 1 painting : Artemisia, Museo Poldi Pezzoli, Milan (url)
- Master of the View of Ste-Gudule (1480–1499), 1 painting : St Catherine of Alexandria with Sts Elizabeth of Hungary and Dorothy, Private collection (url)
- Master of the Virgo inter Virgines (1450–1505), 3 paintings : Virgin and Child with Sts Catherine, Cecilia, Barbara, and Ursula, Rijksmuseum, Amsterdam (url)
- Jan Matejko (1838–1893), 2 paintings : Portrait of Fryderyk Czartoryski, The Hermitage, St. Petersburg (url)
- Teodoro Matteini (1754–1831), 1 painting : Girl with Letter, Museo d'Arte Moderna, Ca' Pesaro, Venice (url)
- Georg David Matthieu (1737–1778), 3 paintings : Joachim Ulrich Giese, Staatliche Museen, Berlin (url)
- Maxime Maufra (1861–1918), 1 painting : Ile de Bréhat, Private collection (url)
- Franz Anton Maulbertsch (1724–1796), 13 paintings : Rebecca and Eliezer, Szépmûvészeti Múzeum, Budapest (url)
- Henri Mauperché (1602–1686), 1 painting : Landscape with Jephthah and his Daughter, City Art Gallery, Birmingham (url)
- Alphonse Maureau (active in 1870s), 1 painting : Banks of the Seine, Galleria d'Arte Moderna, Florence (url)
- Hubert Maurer (1759–1812), 1 painting : Odysseus with Circe, Akademie der bildenden Künste, Vienna (url)
- Anton Mauve (1838–1888), 2 paintings : Morning Ride on the Beach, Rijksmuseum, Amsterdam (url)
- Edward Harrison May (1824–1887), 2 paintings : Lady Jane Grey Going to Her Execution, Woodmere Art Museum, Philadelphia (url)
- Marie-Constance Mayer (1775–1821), 1 painting : The Sleep of Venus and Cupid, Wallace Collection, London (url)
- Johann Ulrich Mayr (1629–1704), 2 paintings : Self-Portrait, Germanisches Nationalmuseum, Nuremberg (url)
- Juan Bautista Martínez del Mazo (1610/15–1667), 6 paintings : The Artist's Family, Kunsthistorisches Museum, Vienna (url)
- Agnolo di Domenico del Mazziere (c. 1466 – 1513), 4 paintings : Portrait of a Young Woman, Staatliche Museen, Berlin (url)
- Girolamo Mazzola Bedoli (c. 1505 – c. 1569), 2 paintings : The Holy Family, Szépmûvészeti Múzeum, Budapest (url)
- Ludovico Mazzolino (c. 1480 – c. 1530), 5 paintings : Adoration of the Shepherds, Galleria degli Uffizi, Florence (url)
- Sebastiano Mazzoni (c. 1611 – 1678), 2 paintings : Annunciation, Gallerie dell'Accademia, Venice (url)
- Helen Galloway Mcnicoll (1879–1915), 1 painting : In the Shadow of the Tent, Museum of Fine Arts, Montreal (url)
- Adolf von Meckel (1856–1893), 1 painting : British Gas Works on the River Spree, Berlin Museum, Berlin (url)
- László Mednyánszky (1852–1919), 12 paintings : Marshland, Magyar Nemzeti Galéria, Budapest (url)
- Livio Mehus (1630–1691), 1 painting : The Flight to Egypt, Private collection (url)
- Bernardino Mei (1612–1676), 2 paintings : Allegory of Fortune, Galleria Nazionale d'Arte Antica, Rome (url)
- Eliseu Meifrèn (1859–1940), 1 painting : The Marne, Museu Nacional d'Art de Catalunya, Barcelona (url)
- Jean-Louis-Ernest Meissonier (1815–1891), 9 paintings : Barricades in June 1848, Musée du Louvre, Paris (url)
- Anton Melbye (1818–1875), 2 paintings : Sea at Night, The Hermitage, St. Petersburg (url)
- Luis Egidio Meléndez (1716–1780), 13 paintings : Portrait of the Artist, Musée du Louvre, Paris (url)
- Charles Mellin (c. 1600 – 1649), 3 paintings : The Tuscan General Alessandro del Borro (?), Staatliche Museen, Berlin (url)
- Altobello Melone (c. 1490–before 1543), 3 paintings : Tobias and the Angel, Ashmolean Museum, Oxford (url)
- Francesco Melzi (1493–1570), 4 paintings : Flora, The Hermitage, St. Petersburg (url)
- Kaspar Memberger the Elder (c. 1555 – 1618), 6 paintings : Noah's Ark Cycle: 1. Building of the Ark, Residenzgalerie, Salzburg (url)
- Hans Memling (1430–1494), 198 paintings : The Presentation in the Temple, National Gallery of Art, Washington (url)
- François-Guillaume Ménageot (1744–1816), 4 paintings : The Death of Leonardo da Vinci in the Arms of Francis I, Musée de l'Hôtel de Ville, Amboise (url)
- Anton Raphael Mengs (1728–1779), 16 paintings : Portrait of the Singer Domenico Annibaldi, Pinacoteca di Brera, Milan (url)
- Alexandre Menjaud (1773–1832), 2 paintings : Girodet's Farewell to His Studio, Musée Girodet, Montargis (url)
- Adolph Menzel (1815–1905), 20 paintings : The French Window, Nationalgalerie, Berlin (url)
- Giovanni Battista Merano (1632–1698), 2 paintings : Adoration of the Shepherds, Private collection (url)
- Philippe Mercier (c. 1689 – 1760), 2 paintings : Elegant Couples Conversing, Private collection (url)
- Johann Christof Merck (1695–1726), 1 painting : Ulmer Dogge, Jagdschloss Grunewald, Berlin (url)
- Matthäus Merian the Younger (1621–1687), 1 painting : Landgrave Friedrich of Hessen-Eschwege, Jagdschloss Grunewald, Berlin (url)
- Franz Messmer (1728–1773 Wien), 2 paintings : Portrait of Jacob Schmutzer, Akademie der bildenden Künste, Vienna (url)
- Géza Mészöly (1844–1887), 9 paintings : Fishermen's Ferry at the River Tisza, Magyar Nemzeti Galéria, Budapest (url)
- Willard Metcalf (1858–1925), 2 paintings : L'Epte, Giverny, Terra Foundation for the Arts, Chicago (url)
- Gabriël Metsu (1629–1667), 34 paintings : The Feast of the Bean King, Alte Pinakothek, Munich (url)
- Adam Frans van der Meulen (1632–1690), 9 paintings : The Army of Louis XIV in front of Tournai in 1667, Royal Museums of Fine Arts of Belgium, Brussels (url)
- Pieter Meulener (1602–1654), 3 paintings : Cavalry Skirmish, Groeninge Museum, Bruges (url)
- Martin van Meytens (1695–1770), 7 paintings : Self-Portrait, Szépmûvészeti Múzeum, Budapest (url)
- Achille Etna Michallon (1796–1822), 2 paintings : Landscape Inspired by the View of Frascati, Musée du Louvre, Paris (url)
- Georges Michel (1763–1843), 1 painting : Mills at Montmartre, Musée Carnavalet, Paris (url)
- Michelangelo (1475–1564), 2 paintings : Leda and the Swan, National Gallery, London (url)
- Guglielmo Micheli (c. 1516 – 1578), 1 painting : The Lute-playing Venus with Cupid, Szépmûvészeti Múzeum, Budapest (url)
- Jan Miel (1599–1664), 4 paintings : Carnival Time in Rome, Museo del Prado, Madrid (url)
- Hans Mielich (1516–1573), 2 paintings : High Altar, Liebfrauenmünster, Ingolstadt (url)
- Michiel Jansz. van Mierevelt (1567–1641), 13 paintings : Anatomy Lesson of Dr. Willem van der Meer, Gemeente Musea, Delft (url)
- Frans van Mieris the Elder (1635–1681), 18 paintings : Brothel Scene, Mauritshuis, The Hague (url)
- Frans van Mieris the Younger (1689–1763), 1 painting : Old Peasant Holding a Jug, The Hermitage, St. Petersburg (url)
- Willem van Mieris (1662–1747), 9 paintings : The Escaped Bird, Kunsthalle, Hamburg (url)
- Giovanni Migliara (1785–1837), 1 painting : Venetian View, Private collection (url)
- Nicolas Mignard (1606–1668), 2 paintings : Virgin and Child, Musée des Beaux-Arts, Marseille (url)
- Pierre Mignard (1612–1695), 11 paintings : Clio, Szépmûvészeti Múzeum, Budapest (url)
- Abraham Mignon (1640–1679), 9 paintings : Still-Life, Wallraf-Richartz-Museum, Cologne (url)
- George van der Mijn (1723–1763), 2 paintings : Cornelis Ploos van Amstel, Mauritshuis, The Hague (url)
- Hieronymous van der Myn (1687–1761), 2 paintings : A Bacchante, Private collection (url)
- Daniël Mijtens (1590–1647), 4 paintings : Charles I, King of England, Metropolitan Museum of Art, New York (url)
- Daniel Mijtens the Younger (1644–1688), 1 painting : Danaë, Private collection (url)
- Johannes Mytens (1614–1670), 4 paintings : The Family of Willem Van Der Does, Museum Mayer van den Bergh, Antwerp (url)
- Martin Mijtens (1648–1736), 1 painting : Self-Portrait, Rijksmuseum, Amsterdam (url)
- Aureliano Milani (1675–1749), 1 painting : Expulsion of Adam and Eve, Private collection (url)
- Josef Ignaz Mildorfer (1719–1775), 3 paintings : Pietà, Holy Spirit Church, Sopron (url)
- Kosta Miličević (1877–1920), 1 painting : Spring, National Museum, Belgrade (url) His name is spelled incorrectly on the Web Gallery
- John Everett Millais (1829–1896), 3 paintings : The Blind Girl, City Art Gallery, Birmingham (url)
- Francisque Millet (1642–1679), 2 paintings : Imaginary Landscape, Szépmûvészeti Múzeum, Budapest (url)
- Jean-François Millet (1814–1875), 13 paintings : The Winnower, Musée du Louvre, Paris (url)
- Tommaso Minardi (1787–1871), 2 paintings : Madonna of the Rosary, Galleria Nazionale d'Arte Moderna e Contemporanea, Rome (url)
- Hendrik van Minderhout (1630–1696), 4 paintings : The Handelskom at Bruges, Groeninge Museum, Bruges (url)
- Joaquin Mir Trinxet (1873–1940), 1 painting : The Waters of the Moguda, Museo del Prado, Madrid (url)
- Anton Mirou (1578–1627), 3 paintings : Extensive Landscape with the Rest on the Flight into Egypt, Private collection (url)
- Claes Corneliszoon Moeyaert (1592–1655), 2 paintings : Triumph of Bacchus, Mauritshuis, The Hague (url)
- Louise Moillon (1609–1696), 8 paintings : Still-Life with Cherries, Strawberries and Gooseberries, Norton Simon Museum of Art, Pasadena (url)
- Pier Francesco Mola (1612–1666), 7 paintings : Jacob Meeting Rachel, The Hermitage, St. Petersburg (url)
- Jan Miense Molenaer (1610–1668), 20 paintings : Two Boys and a Girl Making Music, National Gallery, London (url)
- Nicolaes Molenaer (1626–1676), 4 paintings : Winter Landscape, Private collection (url)
- Antonio Molinari (1655–1704), 1 painting : Adoration of the Golden Calf, The Hermitage, St. Petersburg (url)
- Pieter de Molijn (1620–1690), 8 paintings : Dunes, Herzog Anton Ulrich-Museum, Braunschweig (url)
- Hendrick Mommers (1623–1693), 1 painting : Market Scene, Private collection (url)
- Frans de Momper (1603–1660), 1 painting : Winter Landscape, Private collection (url)
- Jan de Momper (1617–1688), 1 painting : Grape Harvest, Akademie der bildenden Künste, Vienna (url)
- Joos de Momper (1564–1635), 23 paintings : Helicon or Minerva's Visit to the Muses, Koninklijk Museum voor Schone Kunsten, Antwerp (url)
- Paolo Monaldi (c. 1730 – 1800), 2 paintings : Village Festival, Private collection (url)
- Claude Monet (1840–1926), 196 paintings : Corner of the Studio, Musée d'Orsay, Paris (url)
- Louis de Moni (1698–1771), 1 painting : Soap Bubbles, Private collection (url)
- Jean-Baptiste Monnoyer (1636–1699), 7 paintings : Flowers, Residenzgalerie, Salzburg (url)
- Nicolas-André Monsiau (1754–1837), 1 painting : Ulysses Returning to His Palace after Slaying the Lovers of Penelope, Private collection (url)
- Bartolomeo Montagna (c. 1450 – 1523), 5 paintings : Madonna and Child under a Pergola with St John the Baptist and St Onofrius, Pinacoteca Civica, Vicenza (url)
- Carel de Moor (1655–1738), 3 paintings : Angler, Rijksmuseum, Amsterdam (url)
- Antonis Mor (1520–1576), 14 paintings : Portrait of Anton Perrenot de Granvelle, Kunsthistorisches Museum, Vienna (url)
- Luis de Morales (c. 1509 – 1586), 7 paintings : Christ Carrying the Cross, Museo del Pariarca, Valencia (url)
- Morazzone (1573–1626), 3 paintings : Martyrdom of Sts Seconda and Rufina, Pinacoteca di Brera, Milan (url)
- Angelo Morbelli (1853–1919), 2 paintings : High Day in the Trivulzio Hospice in Milan, Musée d'Orsay, Paris (url)
- Jacob More (1740–1793), 2 paintings : Self-Portrait, Galleria degli Uffizi, Florence (url)
- Gustave Moreau (1826–1898), 5 paintings : Self-Portrait, Musée National Gustave-Moreau, Paris (url)
- Paulus Moreelse (1571–1638), 5 paintings : Sophia Hedwig, Countess of Nassau Dietz, with her Three Sons, Rijksmuseum, Het Loo Palace, Appeldorn (url)
- Domenico Morelli (1823–1901), 2 paintings : The Iconoclasts, Museo Nazionale di Capodimonte, Naples (url)
- Henry Moret (1856–1913), 2 paintings : Ouessant, Calm Seas, Private collection (url)
- Moretto da Brescia (c. 1498 – 1554), 19 paintings : Count Fortunato Martinengo Cesaresco, National Gallery, London (url)
- Berthe Morisot (1841–1895), 16 paintings : The Artist's Mother and Sister (Reading), National Gallery of Art, Washington (url)
- George Morland (1763–1804), 2 paintings : Gipsies, The Hermitage, St. Petersburg (url)
- Domenico Morone (c. 1442 – c. 1518), 1 painting : Battle between the Gonzaga and the Bonacolsi, Palazzo Ducale, Mantua (url)
- Giovanni Battista Moroni (1525–1578), 19 paintings : Abbess Lucrezia Agliardi Vertova, Metropolitan Museum of Art, New York (url)
- James Wilson Morrice (1865–1924), 1 painting : Quai des Grands-Augustins, Paris, National Gallery of Canada, Ottawa (url)
- Jean-Laurent Mosnier (c. 1743 – 1808), 1 painting : Portrait of a Lady, Private collection (url)
- Gillis Mostaert (1528–1598), 5 paintings : Netherlandish Household, Szépmûvészeti Múzeum, Budapest (url)
- Jan Mostaert (1465–1553), 8 paintings : Abraham and Hagar, Museo Thyssen-Bornemisza, Madrid (url)
- Frederik de Moucheron (1633–1686), 5 paintings : Mountain Scene with Herd of Cattle, Wallraf-Richartz-Museum, Cologne (url)
- Isaac de Moucheron (1667–1744), 1 painting : Southern Landscape, Private collection (url)
- Pedro de Moya (1610 – c. 1666), 3 paintings : Holy Family, Museo Cerralbo, Madrid (url)
- Pieter Mulier the Elder (1600–1659), 4 paintings : Ships in a Heavy Sea Running Before a Storm, National Maritime Museum, London (url)
- Pieter Mulier II (1637–1701), 5 paintings : Storm at Sea, National Gallery of Slovenia, Ljubljana (url)
- Jan Harmensz. Muller (1571–1628), 1 painting : Lot and His Daughters, Private collection (url)
- William Mulready (1786–1863), 1 painting : The Sonnet, Victoria and Albert Museum, London (url)
- Cristoforo Munari (1667–1720), 4 paintings : Still-Life with Musical Instruments, Galleria degli Uffizi, Florence (url)
- Mihály Munkácsy (1844–1900), 19 paintings : Condemned Cell (The Convict), Magyar Nemzeti Galéria, Budapest (url)
- Francesco de Mura (1696–1782), 3 paintings : The Death of Virginia, Manchester Art Gallery, Manchester (url)
- Emanuel Murant (1662–1700), 3 paintings : Dilapidated Farm, Rijksmuseum, Amsterdam (url)
- Bartolomé Esteban Murillo (1617–1682), 59 paintings : Joseph and Potiphar's Wife, Staatliche Museen, Kassel (url)
- Michiel van Musscher (1645–1705), 3 paintings : The Painter's Studio, Historisch Museum Het Schielandhuis, Rotterdam (url)
- Girolamo Muziano (1528/1532–1592), 1 painting : Assumption of the Virgin, Private collection (url)

== N ==
- János Nagy Balogh (1874–1919), 6 paintings : Self-Portrait, Magyar Nemzeti Galéria, Budapest (url)
- Matthijs Naiveu (1647–1721), 5 paintings : Newborn Baby, Metropolitan Museum of Art, New York (url)
- Giovanni Battista Naldini (c. 1537 – 1591), 2 paintings : Bathsheba, The Hermitage, St. Petersburg (url)
- Filippo Napoletano (ca. 1589 Napoli-1629), 5 paintings : Naval Battle, Museo dell'Opificio delle Pietre Dure, Florence (url)
- Alexander Nasmyth (1758–1840), 1 painting : A View of Tantallon Castle, National Gallery of Scotland, Edinburgh (url)
- Patrick Nasmyth (1787–1831), 1 painting : Landscape with a Pond, The Hermitage, St. Petersburg (url)
- Charles-Joseph Natoire (1700–1777), 4 paintings : The Expulsion from Paradise, Metropolitan Museum of Art, New York (url)
- Jean-Baptiste Nattier (1678–1726), 1 painting : Joseph and Potiphar's Wife, The Hermitage, St. Petersburg (url)
- Jean-Marc Nattier (1685–1766), 21 paintings : Joseph Bonnier de la Mosson, National Gallery of Art, Washington (url)
- Juan Fernández de Navarrete (c. 1526 – 1538 – 1579), 2 paintings : Baptism of Christ, Museo del Prado, Madrid (url)
- François-Joseph Navez (1787–1869), 3 paintings : The Nymph Salmacis and Hermaphroditus, Museum voor Schone Kunsten, Ghent (url)
- Bartolomeo Nazari (1699–1758), 1 painting : Portrait of Doge Vincenzo Querini, Museo Correr, Venice (url)
- Pieter Neeffs I (1568–1656), 9 paintings : Interior of Antwerp Cathedral at Night, Museum of Fine Arts, Boston (url)
- Pieter Neeffs II (1620–1659), 5 paintings : Interior of the Antwerp Cathedral, The Hermitage, St. Petersburg (url)
- Aert van der Neer (1603–1677), 11 paintings : Fishing at Moonlight, Kunsthistorisches Museum, Vienna (url)
- Eglon van der Neer (1634–1703), 13 paintings : Elegant Couple in an Interior, Wadsworth Atheneum, Hartford (url)
- Pietro Negri (c. 1628 – 1679), 1 painting : The Madonna Saves Venice from the Plague of 1630, Scuola Grande di San Rocco, Venice (url)
- Plautilla Nelli (1523–1588), 1 painting : Lamentation, Museo di San Marco, Florence (url)
- Caspar Netscher (1639–1684), 12 paintings : Two Boys Blowing Bubbles, National Gallery, London (url)
- Constantijn Netscher (1668–1723), 1 painting : Portrait of King William III of England, Private collection (url)
- Nicolas Neufchatel (c. 1527 – 1590), 5 paintings : Emperor Maximilian II, Kunsthistorisches Museum, Vienna (url)
- Josef Neugebauer (1810–1895), 1 painting : Portrait of Theresia Niedermeyer, Akademie der bildenden Künste, Vienna (url)
- Eugen Neureuther (1806–1882), 1 painting : The Arts Flourishing in Munich, Sammlung Schack, Munich (url)
- Niccolò Pisano (1470 – c. 1538), 1 painting : The Holy Family, Private collection (url)
- Adriaen van Nieulandt the younger (1587–1658), 3 paintings : Kitchen Scene, Herzog Anton Ulrich-Museum, Braunschweig (url)
- Willem van Nieulandt II (1584–1635), 2 paintings : View of the Forum Romanum, Private collection (url)
- Ivan Nikitin (1680s–ca. 1742), 2 paintings : Portrait of Peter the Great on his Death-Bed, The Hermitage, St. Petersburg (url)
- Giuseppe De Nittis (1846–1884), 5 paintings : Breakfast in the Garden, Galleria Giuseppe de Nittis, Barletta (url)
- Jean Nocret (1617–1672), 1 painting : The Family of Louis XIV, Château de Versailles, Versailles (url)
- Giuseppe Nogari (1699–1766), 1 painting : Peter the Apostle, Gemäldegalerie, Dresden (url)
- Joseph Nollekens (1737–1823), 1 painting : A Dancing Couple in an Outdoor Musical Party, Private collection (url)
- François de Nomé (1593–1644), 10 paintings : Belisarius Recognized by one of his Soldiers, Musée des Beaux-Arts, Orléans (url)
- Plinio Nomellini (1866–1943), 6 paintings : The First Birthday, Galleria d'Arte Moderna, Florence (url)
- Donatien Nonnotte (1708–1785), 1 painting : Portrait of the Marquise de Gast, Private collection (url)
- Luigi Nono (1850–1918), 2 paintings : Abandoned, Museo d'Arte Moderna, Ca' Pesaro, Venice (url)
- Reinier Nooms (1623–1664), 3 paintings : Merchant Vessel at Anchor, Akademie der bildenden Künste, Vienna (url)
- Bengt Nordenberg (1822–1902), 1 painting : Dead Stag, The Hermitage, St. Petersburg (url)
- Karl Nordström (1855–1923), 1 painting : A Clearing in the Woods at Grèz, Norrköpings Konstmuseum, Norrköping (url)
- Pietro Novelli (1603–1647), 4 paintings : Cain and Abel, Galleria Nazionale d'Arte Antica, Rome (url)
- Pedro Nuñez de Villavicencio (1644–1700), 2 paintings : Boy Attacked by a Dog, Szépmûvészeti Múzeum, Budapest (url)
- Carlo Francesco Nuvolone (1608–1665), 7 paintings : The Artist and his Family, Pinacoteca di Brera, Milan (url)
- Giuseppe Nuvolone (1619–1703), 3 paintings : Christ and the Woman Taken in Adultery, Private collection (url)
- Panfilo Nuvolone (1581–1651), 4 paintings : Maiolica Bowl with Peaches, Grapes, and Bees, Silvano Lodi Collection, Campione (url)
- Wijnand Nuijen (1813–1839), 1 painting : River Landscape with Ruins, Rijksmuseum, Amsterdam (url)

== O ==
- Jacob Ochtervelt (1634–1682), 8 paintings : A Family Group, Szépmûvészeti Múzeum, Budapest (url)
- James Arthur O'Connor (1792–1841), 1 painting : Mountainous Continental Landscape, Private collection (url)
- Joseph Denis Odevaere (1775–1830), 4 paintings : Portrait of François Wynckelman, François van der Donckt and Joseph Odevaere, Groeninge Museum, Bruges (url)
- Ernst Ferdinand Oehme (1797–1855), 1 painting : Cathedral in Winter, Gemäldegalerie, Dresden (url)
- Marco d'Oggiono (c. 1475 – 1530), 4 paintings : The Three Archangels, Pinacoteca di Brera, Milan (url)
- Jan Olis (1610–1676), 2 paintings : Elegant Company Playing Cards, Private collection (url)
- Ferdinand Olivier (1785–1841), 1 painting : Elijah in the Wilderness, Neue Pinakothek, Munich (url)
- Michel-Barthélémy Ollivier (1712–1784), 1 painting : Afternoon Tea at the Temple, Musée National du Château, Versailles (url)
- Balthasar Paul Ommeganck (1755–1826), 1 painting : Landscape with a Flock of Sheep, The Hermitage, St. Petersburg (url)
- Jacob van Oost (1603–1671), 7 paintings : David Bearing the Head of Goliath, The Hermitage, St. Petersburg (url)
- Jacob van Oost the Younger (1639–1713), 2 paintings : St Macarius of Ghent Giving Aid to the Plague Victims, Musée du Louvre, Paris (url)
- Izaak van Oosten (1613–1661), 4 paintings : Landscape with a Cavalry Group, The Hermitage, St. Petersburg (url)
- Maria van Oosterwijck (1630–1693), 2 paintings : Flowers and Fruit, Galleria Palatina (Palazzo Pitti), Florence (url)
- John Opie (1761–1807), 3 paintings : Peasant Family, Tate Gallery, London (url)
- Bernard van Orley (1490–1541), 14 paintings : Altarpiece of Sts Thomas and Matthew (detail), Kunsthistorisches Museum, Vienna (url)
- Pedro Orrente (1580–1645), 5 paintings : The Supper at Emmaus, Szépmûvészeti Múzeum, Budapest (url)
- Lelio Orsi (1511–1587), 1 painting : Martyrdom of St Catherine of Alexandria, Galleria Estense, Modena (url)
- Ortolano Ferrarese (1485 – c. 1527), 1 painting : Mourning the Dead Christ, Galleria Borghese, Rome (url)
- Georgius Jacobus Johannes van Os (1782–1861), 1 painting : Still-Life of Fruit, Private collection (url)
- Jan van Os (1744–1808), 5 paintings : River Landscape, Private collection (url)
- Adriaen van Ostade (1610–1685), 37 paintings : Brawl, Pushkin Museum, Moscow (url)
- Isaac van Ostade (1621–1649), 11 paintings : Barn Interior, Staatliche Museen, Berlin (url)
- Michael Ostendorfer (c. 1494 – 1549), 1 painting : Self-Portrait, Liechtenstein Museum, Vienna (url)
- Jean-Baptiste Oudry (1686–1755), 14 paintings : Allegory of Europe, Sarah Campbell Blaffer Foundation, Houston (url)
- Albert van Ouwater (1410–1475), 1 painting : The Raising of Lazarus, Staatliche Museen, Berlin (url)
- Isaac Ouwater (1748–1793), 4 paintings : The Lottery Office, Rijksmuseum, Amsterdam (url)
- Jürgen Ovens (1623–1678), 2 paintings : Portrait of Cornelis Nuyts, Rijksmuseum, Amsterdam (url)
- Friedrich Overbeck (1789–1869), 3 paintings : Italia and Germania, Neue Pinakothek, Munich (url)

== P ==
- László Paál (1846–1879), 14 paintings : Noon, Magyar Nemzeti Galéria, Budapest (url)
- Michele Pace del Campidoglio (c. 1610 – c. 1670), 5 paintings : Still-Life with Grapes, The Hermitage, St. Petersburg (url)
- Pacecco de Rosa (1607–1656), 1 painting : The Judgment of Paris, Akademie der bildenden Künste, Vienna (url)
- Michael Pacher (c. 1435 – 1498), 1 painting : Mary of Burgundy, Heinz Kisters Collection, Kreuzlingen (url)
- Henri Ambrosius Pacx (1603–1668), 1 painting : The Princes of Orange and Their Families Riding Out from the Buitenhof, Mauritshuis, The Hague (url)
- Il Padovanino (1588–1649), 7 paintings : The Madonna with Design of a Shrine, Santa Maria della Salute, Venice (url)
- Joseph Paelinck (1781–1839), 1 painting : The Fair Anthia Leading her Companions to the Temple of Diana in Ephesus, Museum voor Schone Kunsten, Ghent (url)
- Gregorio Pagani (1558–1605), 1 painting : Madonna and the Child with Saints, The Hermitage, St. Petersburg (url)
- Paolo Pagani (1655–1716), 2 paintings : St Jerome, Liechtenstein Museum, Vienna (url)
- Pelagio Palagi (1775/77–1860), 2 paintings : Newton's Discovery of the Refraction of Light, Pinacoteca Tosio Martinengo, Brescia (url)
- Anthonie Palamedesz. (1601–1673), 10 paintings : Company Dining and Making Music, Mauritshuis, The Hague (url)
- Palamedes Palamedesz. (I) (1607–1638), 3 paintings : Cavalry Battle, Stockholms Universitet Konstsamling, Stockholm (url)
- Filippo Palizzi (1818–1899), 1 painting : Urchins, Galleria Palatina (Palazzo Pitti), Florence (url)
- Palma il Giovane (1546–1628), 32 paintings : Self-Portrait, Pinacoteca di Brera, Milan (url)
- Palma Vecchio (1479–1528), 24 paintings : The Three Sisters (detail), Gemäldegalerie, Dresden (url)
- Antonio Palma (c. 1510 – 1575), 1 painting : 'Sacra Conversazione' in a Landscape, Private collection (url)
- Marco Palmezzano (c. 1459 – c. 1539), 5 paintings : The Baptism of Christ, Pinacoteca Civica, Forlí (url)
- Antonio Palomino (1655–1726), 1 painting : Assumption of the Virgin, Museo de Bellas Artes, Bilbao (url)
- Józef Pankiewicz (1866–1940), 1 painting : The Old City Market, Warsaw, at Night, Muzeum Narodowe, Poznan (url)
- Giovanni Paolo Pannini (1691–1765), 22 paintings : Roman Capriccio: The Pantheon and Other Monuments, Museum of Art, Indianapolis (url)
- Juan Pantoja de la Cruz (1553–1608), 5 paintings : Duke of Lerma, Fundación Lerma, Toledo (url)
- Pietro Paolini (1603–1681), 1 painting : The Mystic Marriage of St Catherine of Alexandria, Galleria Nazionale d'Arte Antica, Rome (url)
- Juan de Pareja (1606–1670), 1 painting : Portrait of a Monk, The Hermitage, St. Petersburg (url)
- Luis Paret y Alcázar (1746–1799), 7 paintings : Charles III Dining before the Court, Museo del Prado, Madrid (url)
- Parmigianino (1503–1540), 16 paintings : Portrait of a Young Lady, Museo Nazionale di Capodimonte, Naples (url)
- Joseph Parrocel (1646–1704), 2 paintings : The Crossing of the Rhine by the Army of Louis XIV, 1672, Musée du Louvre, Paris (url)
- Ulrika Pasch (1733–1805), 1 painting : Portrait of Queen Sophie-Magdalene, The Hermitage, St. Petersburg (url)
- Lorenzo Pasinelli (1629–1700), 1 painting : Allegory of Eternity, Private collection (url)
- Fortunato Pasquetti (c. 1700 – 1773), 1 painting : Portrait of the Nobleman Gerolamo Maria Balbi, Museo del Settecento Veneziano, Ca' Rezzonico, Venice (url)
- Giuseppe Passeri (1654–1714), 2 paintings : Companions of Armida and Rinaldo, Musée du Louvre, Paris (url)
- Bartolomeo Passerotti (1529–1592), 8 paintings : The Butcher's Shop, Galleria Nazionale d'Arte Antica, Rome (url)
- Domenico Passignano (1559–1638), 1 painting : The Resurrection, Pinacoteca, Vatican (url)
- Thomas Patch (1725–1782), 1 painting : View of an Italian Harbour, Private collection (url)
- Pierre Patel (1605–1676), 3 paintings : Landscape with Ruins, Museum of Fine Arts, Springfield (url)
- Pierre-Antoine Patel (1648–1707), 1 painting : A Classical Landscape, Private collection (url)
- Joachim Patinir (1480–1524), 15 paintings : Baptism of Christ, Kunsthistorisches Museum, Vienna (url)
- Jean-Baptiste Pater (1695–1736), 16 paintings : The Chinese Hunt, Musée du Louvre, Paris (url)
- Joseph Noel Paton (1821–1901), 1 painting : 'Home': The Return from the Crimea, Royal Collection, Windsor (url)
- Christopher Paudiß (1630–1666), 2 paintings : Portrait of a Young Man in a Fur Hat, The Hermitage, St. Petersburg (url)
- Hanna Pauli (1864–1940), 1 painting : Breakfast, Nationalmuseum, Stockholm (url)
- Julius Paulsen (1860–1940), 2 paintings : St. John's on Tisvilde Beach, Statens Museum for Kunst, Copenhagen (url)
- James Peale (1749–1831), 1 painting : Still Life: Balsam Apples and Vegetables, Metropolitan Museum of Art, New York (url)
- Bartolomeo Pedon (1665–1732), 1 painting : Ruins, Private collection (url)
- Jan van Pee (1630–1710), 1 painting : Mother and Child in an Interior, Private collection (url)
- Bonaventura Peeters (1614–1652), 1 painting : View of a Southern Coast, Private collection (url)
- Bonaventura Peeters (1614–1652), 9 paintings : Fortified Harbour, The Hermitage, St. Petersburg (url)
- Clara Peeters (1580–1641), 2 paintings : Still-Life with Flowers and Goblets, Staatliche Kunsthalle, Karlsruhe (url)
- Gillis Peeters (1612–1653), 3 paintings : Estuary Scene, Private collection (url)
- Giovanni Antonio Pellegrini (1675–1741), 6 paintings : Allegory of Sculpture, Gallerie dell'Accademia, Venice (url)
- Pellegrino da San Daniele (1467–1547), 1 painting : St John the Baptist, Szépmûvészeti Múzeum, Budapest (url)
- Giuseppe Pellizza da Volpedo (1868–1907), 2 paintings : The Statue of Villa Borghese, Museo d'Arte Moderna, Ca' Pesaro, Venice (url)
- Georg Pencz (1500–1550), 3 paintings : Portrait of Count Palatine Ottheinrich, The Hermitage, St. Petersburg (url)
- Pier Maria Pennacchi (1464 – c. 1515), 1 painting : Dormition of the Virgin, Gallerie dell'Accademia, Venice (url)
- Gianfrancesco Penni (1488–1528), 1 painting : Holy Family with the Infant St John, Galleria Borghese, Rome (url)
- Luca Penni (1500–1556), 1 painting : The Judgment of Otto, Musée du Louvre, Paris (url)
- Pensionante Del Saraceni (fl.1610–1620), 4 paintings : The Chicken Vendor, Museo del Prado, Madrid (url)
- Maarten Pepyn (1575–1642), 2 paintings : St Norbert, O.-L. Vrouwekathedraal, Antwerp (url)
- Sante Peranda (1566–1638), 2 paintings : Martyrdom of St Christina, Basilica dei Santi Giovanni e Paolo, Venice (url)
- Antonio de Pereda (1611–1678), 14 paintings : The Knight's Dream, Real Academia de San Fernando, Madrid (url)
- Gabriel Perelle (1603–1677), 1 painting : View of The Flora in Versailles, The Hermitage, St. Petersburg (url)
- Francisco Pérez Sierra (1627–1709), 2 paintings : Vase of Flowers, Palacio Real, Madrid (url)
- Bartolomé Pérez (1634–1693), 4 paintings : Basket of Flowers, Museo del Prado, Madrid (url)
- Perino del Vaga (1500–1547), 3 paintings : Adoration of the Child, National Gallery of Art, Washington (url)
- François Perrier (1590–1650), 3 paintings : Acis, Galatea, and Polyphemus, Musée du Louvre, Paris (url)
- Jean-Charles Nicaise Perrin (1754–1831), 1 painting : Cyrus and Astyages, Private collection (url)
- Jean-Baptiste Perronneau (1715–1783), 7 paintings : Portrait of Jacques Cazotte, National Gallery, London (url)
- Antoine Marie Perrot (1787–1849), 1 painting : View outside Florence, Private collection (url)
- Lilla Cabot Perry (1848–1933), 3 paintings : Open Air Concert, Museum of Fine Arts, Boston (url)
- Pietro Perugino (1446–1523), 36 paintings : Nativity (Il Presepio), Galleria Nazionale dell'Umbria, Perugia (url)
- Baldassare Peruzzi (1481–1536), 1 painting : Apollo and the Muses, Galleria Palatina (Palazzo Pitti), Florence (url)
- Antoine Pesne (1683–1757), 7 paintings : The Dancer Barbara Campanini, Neues Palais, Potsdam (url)
- Eilif Peterssen (1852–1928), 1 painting : Nocturne, Nasjonalgalleriet, Oslo (url)
- Simone Peterzano (c. 1540 – c. 1596), 5 paintings : Entombment, San Fedele, Milan (url)
- Hippolyte Petitjean (1854–1929), 1 painting : Notre-Dame, Private collection (url)
- John Frederick Peto (1854–1907), 3 paintings : Books, Mug, Pipe, and Violin, Museo Thyssen-Bornemisza, Madrid (url)
- Giuseppe Antonio Petrini (1677 – c. 1756), 2 paintings : A Philosopher, Akademie der bildenden Künste, Vienna (url)
- Nadežda Petrović (1873–1915), 2 paintings : Bois de Boulogne, Museum for Modern Art, Belgrade (url) Her name is spelled incorrectly on the Web gallery
- August von Pettenkofen (1822–1889), 1 painting : Gipsy Children, The Hermitage, St. Petersburg (url)
- Jean-François Pierre Peyron (1744–1814), 6 paintings : Alceste mourante, Musée du Louvre, Paris (url)
- Franz Pforr (1788–1812), 3 paintings : St George and the Dragon, Städelsches Kunstinstitut, Frankfurt (url)
- Theodor Philipsen (1840–1920), 2 paintings : A Lane at Kastrup, Statens Museum for Kunst, Copenhagen (url)
- Thomas Phillips (1770–1845), 2 paintings : Byron in Arnaout Dress, National Portrait Gallery, London (url)
- Callisto Piazza (c. 1500 – 1561/1562), 4 paintings : The Adoration of the Christ Child with Saints, Santissima Trinità, Crema (url)
- Martino Piazza da Lodi (1475/80-1523), 1 painting : Madonna and Child with the Infant St John, Szépmûvészeti Múzeum, Budapest (url)
- Giovanni Battista Piazzetta (1682–1754), 22 paintings : The Virgin Appearing to St Philip Neri, Santa Maria della Consolazione (Fava), Venice (url)
- Jean-Michel Picart (1600–1682), 3 paintings : Flowers in Vase on Ledge, Musée des Beaux-Arts, Troyes (url)
- Joseph von Pichler (1730–1808), 1 painting : Flower Piece, Akademie der bildenden Künste, Vienna (url)
- Nicolaes Eliaszoon Pickenoy (1588–1655), 5 paintings : Man with a Celestial Globe, Metropolitan Museum of Art, New York (url)
- François-Édouard Picot (1786–1868), 2 paintings : Cupid and Psyche, Private collection (url)
- Jan Willem Pieneman (1779–1853), 1 painting : The Triumvirate Assuming Power on behalf of the Prince of Orange, 21 November 1813, Rijksmuseum, Amsterdam (url)
- Pier Francesco Fiorentino (1444–1445–after 1497), 1 painting : Virgin and Child before a Rose Hedge, National Trust, London (url)
- Piero della Francesca (1410–1492), 27 paintings : Polyptych of the Misericordia, Pinacoteca Comunale, Sansepolcro (url)
- Piero di Cosimo (1462–1521), 20 paintings : The Discovery of Honey, Worcester Art Museum, Worcester (url)
- Alessandro Pieroni (1550–1607), 1 painting : Portrait of Cosimo de' Medici the Elder, Eredità Bardini, Florence (url)
- Jean-Baptiste Marie Pierre (1714–1789), 4 paintings : Old Man in the Kitchen, The Hermitage, St. Petersburg (url)
- Pieter Pietersz the Elder (1540–1603), 3 paintings : The Three Young Men in the Blazing Furnace, Frans Halsmuseum, Haarlem (url)
- Pietro da Cortona (1596–1669), 12 paintings : Pietà, Santa Chiara, Cortona (url)
- Pietro da Vicenza (c. 1467 – 1527), 1 painting : Madonna Adoring the Christ Child, Private collection (url)
- Ludovic Piette (1826–1877), 1 painting : The Market outside Pontoise Town Hall, Musée Pissarro, Pontoise (url)
- Simone Pignoni (1611–1698), 1 painting : Death of St Petronilla, The Hermitage, St. Petersburg (url)
- Jean-Baptiste Pillement (1728–1808), 6 paintings : Landscape, Museo del Prado, Madrid (url)
- Karl von Piloty (1826–1886), 2 paintings : Seni at the Dead Body of Wallenstein, Neue Pinakothek, Munich (url)
- Isidore Pils (1813–1875), 2 paintings : Horse Caparisoned, Gallery of New South Wales, Sydney (url)
- Marco Pino (1517–1588), 2 paintings : Noli me tangere, Museo dei Cappuccini, Rome (url)
- Pinturicchio (1452–1513), 2 paintings : The Crucifixion with Sts Jerome and Christopher, Galleria Borghese, Rome (url)
- Domenico Piola (1627–1703), 5 paintings : Magdalene in the Desert, Oratorio di Santa Maria Maddalena, Laigueglia (url)
- Camille Pissarro (1830–1903), 75 paintings : The Mailcoach at Louveciennes, Musée d'Orsay, Paris (url)
- Georges Pissarro (1871–1961), 1 painting : The Harbour at Rouen, Private collection (url)
- Lucien Pissarro (1863–1944), 2 paintings : The Church at Gisors, Musée d'Orsay, Paris (url)
- Giambattista Pittoni (1687–1767), 13 paintings : Annunciation, Gallerie dell'Accademia, Venice (url)
- Johann Georg Platzer (1704–1761), 2 paintings : Miraculous Catch of Fish, Residenzgalerie, Salzburg (url)
- Karel van der Pluym (1625–1672), 1 painting : Old Man Holding a Pair of Spectacles, The Hermitage, St. Petersburg (url)
- Giacomo del Po (1652–1726), 1 painting : King David Playing the Harp, Private collection (url)
- Giovanni Andrea Podestà (1608–1674), 1 painting : Putti in a Landscape, Private collection (url)
- Władysław Podkowiński (1866–1895), 2 paintings : Children in the Garden, Muzeum Narodowe, Warsaw (url) His name is spelled incorrectly on the Web Gallery
- Egbert van der Poel (1621–1664), 10 paintings : View of Delft after the Explosion of 1654, National Gallery, London (url)
- Cornelius van Poelenburgh (1595–1667), 20 paintings : Amaryllis Giving Myrtill the Price, Staatliche Museen, Berlin (url)
- Jan Polack (c. 1450 – 1519), 1 painting : Portrait of a Benedictine Monk, Museo Thyssen-Bornemisza, Madrid (url)
- Vasily Dmitrievich Polenov (1844–1927), 1 painting : A Yard in Moscow, State Tretyakov Gallery, Moscow (url)
- Polidoro da Lanciano (c. 1515 – 1565), 3 paintings : Christ and the Adulteress, Szépmûvészeti Múzeum, Budapest (url)
- Antonio del Pollaiuolo (1433–1498), 3 paintings : Portrait of a Young Woman, Staatliche Museen, Berlin (url)
- Cristoforo Roncalli (1552–1626), 1 painting : St Domitilla with Sts Nereus and Achilleus, Chiesa dei Santi Nereo e Achilleo, Rome (url)
- Antonio Ponce (1608–1677), 5 paintings : Still-Life in the Kitchen, Museo del Prado, Madrid (url)
- Pontormo (1494–1556), 41 paintings : Leda and the Swan, Galleria degli Uffizi, Florence (url)
- Willem de Poorter (1608–1649), 2 paintings : Still-Life with Weapons and Banners, Herzog Anton Ulrich-Museum, Braunschweig (url)
- Il Poppi (1544–1597), 1 painting : Lamentation over the Dead Christ, Private collection (url) His true name and nickname are combined on the Web Gallery
- Jan Porcellis (1584–1632), 5 paintings : Seascape, The Hermitage, St. Petersburg (url)
- Julius Porcellis (1610–1645), 1 painting : Calm Sea with a Man of War and a Fishing Boat, Private collection (url)
- Il Pordenone (1483–1539), 4 paintings : Madonna and Child Enthroned with Saints, Parish church, Susegana (Treviso) (url)
- Paolo Porpora (1617–1670s), 4 paintings : Still-Life with a Snake, Frogs, Tortoise and a Lizard, National Museum of Wales, Cardiff (url)
- Frans Post (1612–1680), 11 paintings : Brazilian Landscape, Metropolitan Museum of Art, New York (url)
- Pieter Post (1608–1669), 1 painting : Italianate Landscape with the Parting of Jacob and Laban, Frans Halsmuseum, Haarlem (url)
- Hendrik Gerritsz Pot (1585–1657), 7 paintings : Officers of the Civic Guard of St Adrian, Frans Halsmuseum, Haarlem (url)
- Paulus Potter (1625–1654), 23 paintings : Cattle and Sheep in a Stormy Landscape, National Gallery, London (url)
- Pieter Symonsz Potter (1597–1652), 3 paintings : A Barn Interior, Private collection (url)
- Frans Pourbus the Elder (1545–1581), 3 paintings : Portrait of a Young Woman, Museum voor Schone Kunsten, Ghent (url)
- Frans Pourbus the younger (1569–1622), 23 paintings : Archdukes Albert and Isabella, Groeninge Museum, Bruges (url)
- Pieter Pourbus (1523–1584), 7 paintings : Last Judgment, Groeninge Museum, Bruges (url)
- Nicolas Poussin (1594–1665), 119 paintings : Death of the Virgin, Saint-Pancrace, Sterrebeek (url)
- Andrea Pozzo (1642–1709), 2 paintings : Self-Portrait, Galleria degli Uffizi, Florence (url)
- Giovanni Ambrogio de Predis (c.1455–after 1508), 5 paintings : Girl with Cherries, Metropolitan Museum of Art, New York (url)
- Jan Preisler (1872–1918), 1 painting : Bathers, Národní Galerie, Prague (url)
- Maurice Prendergast (1859–1924), 2 paintings : Along the Shore, Columbia Museum of Art, Columbus (url)
- Mattia Preti (1613–1699), 22 paintings : Absalom's Feast, Museo Nazionale di Capodimonte, Naples (url)
- Gaetano Previati (1852–1920), 1 painting : In the Meadow, Galleria dell'Arte Moderna, Palazzo Pitti, Florence (url)
- Andrea Previtali (1480–1528), 4 paintings : Madonna Baglioni, Accademia Carrara, Bergamo (url)
- Francesco Primaticcio (1504–1570), 3 paintings : Ulysses and Penelope, Toledo Museum of Art, Toledo, Ohio (url)
- Camillo Procaccini (c. 1555 – 1629), 1 painting : St Ambrose Stopping Theodosius, Basilica di Sant'Ambrogio, Milan (url)
- Carlo Antonio Procaccini (1571–1630), 1 painting : Flora, Accademia Carrara, Bergamo (url)
- Ercole Procaccini the Younger (1596 – c. 1676), 1 painting : Allegory of Faith, Private collection (url)
- Giulio Cesare Procaccini (1574–1625), 11 paintings : The Annunciation, Musée du Louvre, Paris (url)
- Jan Provoost (1462–1529), 13 paintings : Abraham, Sarah, and the Angel, Musée du Louvre, Paris (url)
- Pierre-Paul Prud'hon (1758–1823), 8 paintings : Portrait of Georges Anthony, Musée des Beaux-Arts, Dijon (url)
- Antonio Puccinelli (1822–1897), 1 painting : Portrait of the Noblewoman Marrocchi, Galleria Palatina (Palazzo Pitti), Florence (url)
- Antonio Puga (1602–1648), 2 paintings : Old Woman Seated, Museo del Prado, Madrid (url)
- Pierre Puget (1620–1694), 10 paintings : St Peter Holding the Key of the Paradise, Parish Church, Grandcamp (url)
- Domenico Puligo (1492–1527), 5 paintings : Madonna and Child with Saints, Santa Maria Maddalena dei Pazzi, Florence (url)
- Scipione Pulzone (1544–1598), 3 paintings : Portrait of Marcantonio Colonna, Galleria Colonna, Rome (url)
- Pierre Puvis de Chavannes (1824–1898), 5 paintings : The Beheading of St John the Baptist, National Gallery, London (url)
- Adam Pynacker (1622–1673), 6 paintings : Barges on a River, The Hermitage, St. Petersburg (url)
- Jacob Pynas (1592–1650), 5 paintings : Mercury and Herse, Galleria degli Uffizi, Florence (url)
- Jan Pynas (1582–1631), 2 paintings : Aaron Changes the Water of the Nile into Blood, Rijksmuseum, Amsterdam (url)

== Q ==
- Martin Ferdinand Quadal (1736–1808), 3 paintings : Life Class in the Vienna Academy, Akademie der bildenden Künste, Vienna (url)
- Domenico Quaglio the Younger (1787–1837), 1 painting : Residenzstrasse Looking Towards Max-Joseph-Platz in 1826, Neue Pinakothek, Munich (url)
- Pieter Quast (1606–1647), 3 paintings : Party of Merrymakers, Metropolitan Museum of Art, New York (url)
- Erasmus Quellinus II (1607–1678), 4 paintings : Achilles among the Daughters of Lycomedes, Groeninge Museum, Bruges (url)
- Jan-Erasmus Quellinus (1634–1715), 1 painting : Thetis Dips Achilles in a Vase with Water from the Styx, Private collection (url)
- August Querfurt (1696–1761), 3 paintings : Cavalry Engagement, Private collection (url)
- Pierre-Antoine Quillard (1701–1733), 2 paintings : Amorous Couples in a Garden Setting, Private collection (url)
- Giovanni Quinsa (active born c. 1640), 2 paintings : Still-Life, Private collection (url)

== R ==
- Henry Raeburn (1756–1823), 5 paintings : Mrs. Anne Hart, Staatliche Museen, Berlin (url)
- Jean-François Raffaëlli (1850–1924), 6 paintings : Houses on the Banks of the Oise, Musée d'Orsay, Paris (url)
- Raffaellino del Garbo (1470–1524), 1 painting : Annunciation, Private collection (url)
- Raphael (1483–1520), 124 paintings : The Creation of Eve from Adam, Pinacoteca Comunale, Città di Castello (url)
- Auguste Raffet (1804–1860), 1 painting : Two French Hussars on Patrol in Winter, The Hermitage, St. Petersburg (url)
- Nicolas-Jean-Baptiste Raguenet (1715–1793), 2 paintings : The Eastern Tip of Ile Saint-Louis, Musée Carnavalet, Paris (url)
- Carl Rahl (1812–1865), 2 paintings : Battle of the Cimbrians, Akademie der bildenden Künste, Vienna (url)
- Arthur von Ramberg (1819–1875), 1 painting : The Court of Emperor Frederick II in Palermo, Neue Pinakothek, Munich (url)
- Johann Anton Ramboux (1790–1866), 2 paintings : The Eberhard Brothers, Wallraf-Richartz-Museum, Cologne (url)
- Felipe Ramirez (1628–1631), 1 painting : Still Life with Cardoon, Francolin, Grapes and Irises, Museo del Prado, Madrid (url)
- Allan Ramsay (1713–1784), 5 paintings : Queen Charlotte with her Two Children, Royal Collection, Windsor (url)
- Jean Ranc (1674–1735), 2 paintings : Ferdinand VI as Prince, Museo del Prado, Madrid (url)
- Jean Raoux (1677–1734), 1 painting : Vestal Virgin, The Hermitage, St. Petersburg (url)
- Georg Anton Rasmussen (1842–1914), 3 paintings : Fjord in Norway, The Hermitage, St. Petersburg (url)
- Jerg Ratgeb (1480–1526), 1 painting : Flagellation of Christ, Staatsgalerie Stuttgart (url)
- Dirck de Quade van Ravesteyn (1565–1620), 3 paintings : Allegory of Music, Kunsthistorisches Museum, Vienna (url)
- Hubert van Ravesteyn (1638–1691), 3 paintings : Still-Life with Porcelain Vase and Smoking Tools, Private collection (url)
- Jan Antonisz. van Ravesteyn (1572–1657), 2 paintings : Portrait of Sir John Burroughs, Rijksmuseum, Amsterdam (url)
- Ferdinand von Rayski (1806–1890), 2 paintings : Portrait of Count Zech-Burkersroda, Gemäldegalerie, Dresden (url)
- Josef Rebell (1787–1828), 1 painting : The Mole at Portici, Neue Pinakothek, Munich (url)
- Elena Recco (1650–1699), 1 painting : Still-Life with Fish and a Shell, The Hermitage, St. Petersburg (url)
- Giacomo Recco (1603–1653), 2 paintings : Still-Life of Flowers, Private collection (url)
- Giovanni Battista Recco (c. 1615 – c. 1660), 2 paintings : Still-Life with a Head of a Ram, Museo Nazionale di Capodimonte, Naples (url)
- Giuseppe Recco (1634–1695), 5 paintings : Kitchen Piece, Akademie der bildenden Künste, Vienna (url)
- Odilon Redon (1840–1916), 2 paintings : Closed Eyes, Musée d'Orsay, Paris (url)
- Henri Regnault (1843–1871), 4 paintings : Summary Execution under the Moorish Kings of Granada, Musée d'Orsay, Paris (url)
- Jean-Baptiste Regnault (1754–1829), 6 paintings : The Origin of Painting: Dibutades Tracing the Portrait of a Shepherd, Musée National du Château, Versailles (url)
- Nicolas Régnier (1588–1667), 9 paintings : St John the Baptist, The Hermitage, St. Petersburg (url)
- Darío de Regoyos (1857–1913), 1 painting : Dolores Otaño, Museo del Prado, Madrid (url)
- Petrus Johannes van Reysschoot (1702–1772), 2 paintings : The Kill, Museum voor Schone Kunsten, Ghent (url)
- Philip Reinagle (1749–1833), 4 paintings : Blue Passion Flower, Yale Center for British Art, New Haven (url)
- Ramsay Richard Reinagle (1775–1862), 4 paintings : Italian Landscape with Lake, Government Hospitality, Lancaster House, London (url)
- Johann Christian Reinhart (1761–1847), 1 painting : The Invention of the Corinthian Capital by Callimachos, Neue Pinakothek, Munich (url)
- Heinrich Reinhold (1788–1825), 1 painting : Terrace of the Capucin Priory in Sorrento, Neue Pinakothek, Munich (url)
- Rembrandt (1606–1669), 278 paintings : The Martyrdom of St Stephen, Musée des Beaux-Arts, Lyon (url)
- Jean-Charles-Joseph Rémond (1795–1875), 1 painting : View of Tivoli from a Grotto, Private collection (url)
- Domenico Remps (c. 1620 – 1699), 2 paintings : Cabinet of Curiosities, Museo dell'Opificio delle Pietre Dure, Florence (url)
- Simon Renard de St. André (1613–1677), 5 paintings : Vanitas, Musée des Beaux-Arts, Marseille (url)
- Guido Reni (1575–1642), 42 paintings : Atalanta and Hippomenes, Museo del Prado, Madrid (url)
- Pierre-Auguste Renoir (1841–1919), 103 paintings : Mademoiselle Romaine Lacaux, Museum of Art, Cleveland (url)
- Ilya Yefimovich Repin (1844–1930), 8 paintings : The Volga Bargemen, State Russian Museum, St. Petersburg (url)
- Pandolfo Reschi (c. 1640 – 1696), 2 paintings : View of the Palazzo Pitti, Galleria Palatina (Palazzo Pitti), Florence (url)
- Jacques Restout (1650 – c. 1701), 4 paintings : Ananias Restoring the Sight of St Paul, Musée du Louvre, Paris (url)
- Jean-Bernard Restout (1732–1797), 1 painting : Portrait of an Architect, Private collection (url)
- Alfred Rethel (1816–1859), 1 painting : Nemesis, The Hermitage, St. Petersburg (url)
- Pierre Révoil (1776–1842), 2 paintings : Mary, Queen of Scots, Separated from Her Faithfuls, Private collection (url)
- Claude-Louis-Marie Revol (1815–1872), 1 painting : Bouquet of Flowers, Private collection (url)
- Marinus van Reymerswaele (1490–1546), 10 paintings : The Banker and His Wife, Musée des Beaux-Arts, Valenciennes (url)
- Joshua Reynolds (1723–1792), 23 paintings : Captain Robert Orme, National Gallery, London (url)
- Francisco Ribalta (1565–1628), 3 paintings : Christ Embracing St Bernard, Museo del Prado, Madrid (url)
- Juan Ribalta (1597–1628), 2 paintings : Adoration of the Shepherds, Museo de Bellas Artes, Bilbao (url)
- Jusepe de Ribera (1590–1656), 36 paintings : Sense of Taste, Wadsworth Atheneum, Hartford (url)
- Augustin Théodule Ribot (1823–1891), 1 painting : The Good Samaritan, Musée des Beaux-Arts, Pau (url)
- Pietro Ricchi (1606–1675), 1 painting : Morra Players, Private collection (url)
- Marco Ricci (1676–1730), 10 paintings : Landscape with Watering Horses, Gallerie dell'Accademia, Venice (url)
- Sebastiano Ricci (1659–1734), 35 paintings : Dream of Aesculapius, Gallerie dell'Accademia, Venice (url)
- Fleury-François Richard (1777–1852), 3 paintings : Montaigne and Tasso, Musée des Beaux-Arts, Lyon (url)
- Adrian Ludwig Richter (1803–1884), 5 paintings : Crossing the Elbe at Aussig, Gemäldegalerie, Dresden (url)
- Franz Ferdinand Richter (1693–1737), 1 painting : Portrait of Gian Gastone de' Medici, Grand Duke of Tuscany, Galleria Palatina (Palazzo Pitti), Florence (url)
- Johan Richter (1665–1745), 5 paintings : View of the Giudecca Canal, Private collection (url)
- Martín Rico (1833–1908), 1 painting : View of Venice, Museo del Prado, Madrid (url)
- August Riedel (1799–1883), 2 paintings : Judith, Neue Pinakothek, Munich (url)
- Henri-François Riesener (1767–1806), 3 paintings : Portrait of Sofia Apraxina, The Hermitage, St. Petersburg (url)
- Hyacinthe Rigaud (1659–1743), 12 paintings : Portrait of Phillippe de Courcillon, Musée National du Château, Versailles (url)
- Pieter Cornelisz van Rijck (1567–1637), 1 painting : The Kitchen Maid, Museum voor Schone Kunsten, Ghent (url)
- Frans Rijckhals (1600–1647), 1 painting : Still-Life, Musée des Beaux-Arts, Dunkerque (url)
- John Riley (1646–1691), 1 painting : Bridget Holmes, a Nonagenarian Housemaid, Royal Collection, Windsor (url)
- Orazio Riminaldi (1593–1630), 1 painting : Sacrifice of Isaac, Galleria Nazionale d'Arte Antica, Rome (url)
- Rinaldo Mantovano (1527–1539), 1 painting : Zephyr Blowing Psyche over the Sea, Sala di Psiche, Palazzo del Tè, Mantua (url)
- Laurits Andersen Ring (1854–1933), 1 painting : Girl Looking out of a Skylight, Nasjonalgalleriet, Oslo (url)
- Ludger tom Ring the Elder (1496–1547), 1 painting : The Delphic Sibyl, Musée du Louvre, Paris (url)
- Ludger Tom Ring the Younger (1522–1584), 1 painting : Vases of Flowers, Westfälischer Kunstverein, Münster (url)
- Pieter de Ring (1615–1660), 1 painting : Still-Life of Musical Instruments, Private collection (url)
- József Rippl-Rónai (1861–1927), 23 paintings : Woman Dressed in Polka Dots Robe, Magyar Nemzeti Galéria, Budapest (url)
- Francisco Rizi (1614–1685), 4 paintings : Virgin and Child with Sts Philip and Francis, Capuchinos, El Pardo (url)
- Hubert Robert (1733–1808), 30 paintings : Avenue in a Park, Royal Museums of Fine Arts of Belgium, Brussels (url)
- Louis Léopold Robert (1794–1835), 2 paintings : The Pilgrimage to the Madonna of the Arch, Musée du Louvre, Paris (url)
- Ercole de' Roberti (1450–1469), 6 paintings : Portrait of Giovanni II Bentivoglio, National Gallery of Art, Washington (url)
- David Roberts (1796–1864), 2 paintings : A View in Cairo, Royal Collection, Windsor (url)
- Theodore Robinson (1852–1896), 3 paintings : Two in a Boat, Phillips Collection, Washington (url)
- Marietta Robusti (1560–1590), 1 painting : Portrait of Ottavio Strada, Stedelijkmuseum, Amsterdam (url)
- Michele Rocca (1675–1751), 3 paintings : The Continence of Scipio, Musée du Louvre, Paris (url)
- Bernhard Rode (1725–1797), 1 painting : The Empress of China Culling Mulberry Leaves, Staatliche Museen, Berlin (url)
- Juan de las Roelas (1560–1625), 4 paintings : Adoration of the Name of Jesus, University Chapel, Seville (url)
- Willem Roelofs (1822–1897), 1 painting : Summertime, Centraal Museum, Utrecht (url)
- Pieter Gerritsz van Roestraten (1630–1700), 3 paintings : Still-Life with Chinese Teabowls, Staatliche Museen, Berlin (url)
- Roelant Roghman (1627–1692), 3 paintings : Landscape, The Hermitage, St. Petersburg (url)
- Christian Rohlfs (1849–1938), 1 painting : Birch Wood, Museum Folkwang, Essen (url)
- Fyodor Rokotov (c. 1735 – 1808), 4 paintings : Portrait of Catherine II, The Hermitage, St. Petersburg (url)
- Anton Romako (1832–1899), 1 painting : Portrait of a Young Man, Residenzgalerie, Salzburg (url)
- Giovanni Francesco Romanelli (1610–1662), 5 paintings : Hercules and Omphale, The Hermitage, St. Petersburg (url)
- Girolamo Romani (c. 1484 – c. 1560), 7 paintings : Christ Carrying the Cross, Pinacoteca di Brera, Milan (url)
- János Rombauer (1782–1849), 8 paintings : Portrait of Historian Ignacius Aurelius Fessler, Hungarian Academy of Sciences, Budapest (url)
- Gillis Rombouts (1630–1672), 1 painting : Wooded Landscape, Private collection (url)
- Salomon Rombouts (1655–1695), 3 paintings : Coast at Scheveningen, Museum der Bildenden Künste, Leipzig (url)
- Theodoor Rombouts (1597–1637), 9 paintings : Allegory of the Five Senses, Museum voor Schone Kunsten, Ghent (url)
- Willem Romeyn (1624–1693), 3 paintings : Cow, Goats and Sheep in a Meadow, Private collection (url)
- George Romney (1734–1802), 8 paintings : Miss Constable, Museu Calouste Gulbenkian, Lisbon (url)
- Niccolo Rondinelli (c. 1468 – c. 1520), 2 paintings : Virgin and Child, Fogg Art Museum, Harvard University, Cambridge (url)
- Jan Roos (1591–1638), 1 painting : Still-Life with Game, Palazzo Rocca, Chiavari (url)
- Johann Heinrich Roos (1631–1685), 2 paintings : Pastoral Landscape, Private collection (url)
- Philipp Peter Roos (1655 – c. 1699), 4 paintings : Landscape with a Waterfall, The Hermitage, St. Petersburg (url)
- Martinus Rørbye (1803–1878), 2 paintings : View from the Artist's Window, Statens Museum for Kunst, Copenhagen (url)
- Salvator Rosa (1615–1673), 25 paintings : Portrait of a Man, The Hermitage, St. Petersburg (url)
- Alessandro Rosi (1627–1697), 8 paintings : Baptism of Christ, San Pietro, Bagno a Ripoli (url)
- Alexander Roslin (1718–1793), 4 paintings : Portrait of Catherine II, The Hermitage, St. Petersburg (url)
- Cosimo Rosselli (1439–1507), 1 painting : Descent from Cross, Museum of Fine Arts, Boston, Boston (url)
- Matteo Rosselli (1578–1650), 2 paintings : The Triumph of David, Musée du Louvre, Paris (url)
- Dante Gabriel Rossetti (1828–1882), 5 paintings : Ecce Ancilla Domini!, Tate Gallery, London (url)
- Rosso Fiorentino (1494–1541), 22 paintings : Madonna and Child with Putti, The Hermitage, St. Petersburg (url)
- Martino Rota (c. 1520 – 1583), 1 painting : Emperor Rudolf II in Armour, Kunsthistorisches Museum, Vienna (url)
- Pietro Rotari (1707–1762), 8 paintings : King Augustus III of Poland, Gemäldegalerie, Dresden (url)
- Hans Rottenhammer (1564–1625), 2 paintings : Allegory of the Arts, Staatliche Museen, Berlin (url)
- Carl Rottmann (1798–1850), 3 paintings : Cefalu, Wallraf-Richartz-Museum, Cologne (url)
- Johann Michael Rottmayr (1656–1730), 2 paintings : Apotheosis of St Charles Borromeo, Residenzgalerie, Salzburg (url)
- Henri Rouart (1833–1912), 1 painting : Terrace on the Banks of the Seine at Melun, Musée d'Orsay, Paris (url)
- Henri Rousseau (1844–1910), 8 paintings : The Repast of the Lion, Metropolitan Museum of Art, New York (url)
- Théodore Rousseau (1812–1867), 8 paintings : Edge of the Forest at Fontainebleau, Setting Sun, Musée du Louvre, Paris (url)
- Theodore Roussel (1847–1926), 1 painting : The Reading Girl, Tate Gallery, London (url)
- Peter van Roy (1683–1740), 1 painting : Prince Johann Adam Andreas I von Liechtenstein, Liechtenstein Museum, Vienna (url)
- Willem Frederiksz van Royen (1645–1723), 4 paintings : The Carrot, Märkisches Museum, Berlin (url)
- Peter Paul Rubens (1577–1640), 292 paintings : The Deposition, Galleria Borghese, Rome (url)
- Isaack van Ruisdael (1599–1677), 1 painting : The Plank Fence, Akademie der bildenden Künste, Vienna (url)
- Jacob Isaacksz van Ruisdael (1628–1682), 57 paintings : Two Watermills and an Open Sluice near Singraven, National Gallery, London (url)
- Philipp Otto Runge (1777–1810), 8 paintings : The Great Morning, Kunsthalle, Hamburg (url)
- Giovan Battista Ruoppolo (1629–1693), 6 paintings : Fruit Still-Life, Gemäldegalerie, Dresden (url)
- Santiago Rusiñol (1861–1931), 3 paintings : A Garden in Aranjuez, Museo del Prado, Madrid (url)
- Robert Russ (1847–1922), 1 painting : Mountain Torrent after the Storm, Residenzgalerie, Salzburg (url)
- Carl Borromäus Andreas Ruthart (1630–1703), 3 paintings : Rest by the Draw Well, Akademie der bildenden Künste, Vienna (url)
- Rachel Ruysch (1664–1750), 11 paintings : Basket of Flowers, Galleria degli Uffizi, Florence (url)
- Salomon van Ruysdael (1602–1670), 36 paintings : After the Rain, Szépmûvészeti Múzeum, Budapest (url)
- David Ryckaert III (1612–1661), 6 paintings : Peasant Woman with a Cat, The Hermitage, St. Petersburg (url)
- Marten Ryckaert (1587–1631), 2 paintings : Pastoral Landscape, Private collection (url)
- Bernaert de Rijckere (c. 1535–1590), 3 paintings : Diana Turns Actaeon into a Stag, Szépmûvészeti Múzeum, Budapest (url)
- Pieter Andreas Rijsbrack (1685–1748), 2 paintings : Game Still-Life, Private collection (url)
- Théo van Rysselberghe (1862–1926), 7 paintings : Heavy Clouds, Christiania Fjord, Museum of Art, Indianapolis (url)

== S ==
- Lorenzo Sabbatini (c. 1520 – 1576), 1 painting : Judith with the Head of Holofernes, Banca del Monte di Bologna e Ravenna, Bologna (url)
- Jean-François Sablet (1745–1819), 1 painting : Portrait of a Conventionnaire in the Revolution, Private collection (url)
- Andrea Sacchi (1599–1661), 7 paintings : The Three Magdalenes, Galleria Nazionale d'Arte Antica, Rome (url)
- Pieter Jansz. Saenredam (1597–1665), 16 paintings : Interior of the Church of St Odulphus, Assendelft, Rijksmuseum, Amsterdam (url)
- Cornelis Saftleven (1607–1681), 6 paintings : Self-Portrait with Easel, Musée du Louvre, Paris (url)
- Herman Saftleven (1609–1685), 9 paintings : Interior of a Peasant Hut, The Hermitage, St. Petersburg (url)
- Gabriel de Saint-Aubin (1724–1780), 3 paintings : The Salon of 1779, Musée du Louvre, Paris (url)
- Gillot Saint-Evre (1791–1858), 1 painting : Joan of Arc in Prison, Private collection (url)
- Simon Saint-Jean (1808–1860), 1 painting : Flowers, The Hermitage, St. Petersburg (url)
- Jacques-Philip-Joseph de Saint-Quentin (1738-?), 1 painting : The Death of Socrates, École des Beaux-Arts, Paris (url)
- Ventura Salimbeni (1567–1613), 3 paintings : The Annunciation, Szépmûvészeti Múzeum, Budapest (url)
- Tommaso Salini (1575–1625), 5 paintings : Boy with a Flask and Cabbages, Museo Thyssen-Bornemisza, Madrid (url)
- Antoine Sallaert (1580–1650), 1 painting : Assumption of the Virgin, Private collection (url)
- Pietro Saltini (1839–1908), 1 painting : Simone Memmi Drawing Laura's Portrait for Petrarch, Galleria dell'Arte Moderna, Palazzo Pitti, Florence (url)
- Alessandro Salucci (1590 – c. 1655), 1 painting : Harbour View with Triumphal Arch, Rijksdienst Beeldende Kunst, The Hague (url)
- Cecchino del Salviati (1510–1563), 10 paintings : Charity, Galleria degli Uffizi, Florence (url)
- Giuseppe Salviati (c. 1520 – c. 1575), 3 paintings : The Raising of Lazarus, Fondazione Querini Stampalia, Venice (url)
- Orazio Samacchini (1532–1577), 1 painting : Allegory of Wisdom, Private collection (url)
- Maso da San Friano (1531–1571), 2 paintings : Portrait of Francesco I de' Medici, Museo Civico, Prato (url)
- Paolo da San Leocadio (c. 1445 – c. 1520), 1 painting : Virgin of the Knight of Montesa, Museo del Prado, Madrid (url)
- Alonso Sánchez Coello (1531–1588), 8 paintings : Portrait of the Infanta Catalina Micaela, The Hermitage, St. Petersburg (url)
- Juan Sánchez Cotán (c. 1560 – 1627), 4 paintings : Still-Life with Game Fowl, Art Institute, Chicago (url)
- Pedro Sánchez de Castro (active 1454–1480), 1 painting : Triptych, Private collection (url)
- Joachim von Sandrart (1606–1688), 4 paintings : Captain Bicker's Company Waiting to Welcome Marie de Medicis in September 1638, Rijksmuseum, Amsterdam (url)
- Bastiano da Sangallo (1481–1551), 1 painting : The Battle of Cascina, Holkham Hall, Norfolk (url)
- Sano di Pietro (1405/1406–1481), 1 painting : Madonna and Child with Sts Anthony Abbott and Bernardino of Siena, Private collection (url)
- Girolamo da Santacroce (1492–1537), 2 paintings : St John the Baptist, Szépmûvészeti Múzeum, Budapest (url)
- Fabrizio Santafede (1576–1623), 2 paintings : The Betrothal of St Catherine, The Hermitage, St. Petersburg (url)
- Jean-Baptiste Santerre (1658–1717), 3 paintings : Susanna at the Bath, Musée du Louvre, Paris (url)
- Giovanni Santi (c. 1435 – 1494), 2 paintings : Man of Sorrows, Szépmûvészeti Múzeum, Budapest (url)
- Dirck van Santvoort (1610–1680), 1 painting : Portrait of Elias van Cuelen, Private collection (url)
- Carlo Saraceni (1579–1620), 11 paintings : An Angel Appearing to the Wife of Manoah, Öffentliche Kunstsammlung, Basel (url)
- Louise-Joséphine Sarazin de Belmont (1790–1870), 2 paintings : Santa Maria del Sasso, near Bibbiena, Metropolitan Museum of Art, New York (url)
- John Singer Sargent (1856–1925), 13 paintings : Carnation, Lily, Lily, Rose, Tate Gallery, London (url)
- Francis Sartorius (1734–1804), 2 paintings : The Chestnut Racehorse "Eclipse", Private collection (url)
- John Nott Sartorius (1759–1828), 3 paintings : A Hunt in Full Cry, Private collection (url)
- Giovanni Battista Salvi da Sassoferrato (1609–1685), 12 paintings : Madonna and Child, Galleria Borghese, Rome (url)
- Piat Joseph Sauvage (1744–1818), 1 painting : Bacchanalia of Children, Musée du Louvre, Paris (url)
- Roelant Savery (1576–1639), 18 paintings : Bouquet of Flowers, Liechtenstein Museum, Vienna (url)
- Girolamo Savoldo (c. 1480 – c. 1548), 11 paintings : St Anthony Abbot and St Paul, Gallerie dell'Accademia, Venice (url)
- Carel van Savoyen (1620–1665), 1 painting : The Judgment of Midas, Private collection (url)
- Andrea Scacciati (1642–1710), 2 paintings : Basket of Flowers with Parrot, Private collection (url)
- Scarsellino (1551–1620), 6 paintings : St Demetrius, Museum of Fine Arts, Boston (url)
- Friedrich Wilhelm Schadow (1789–1862), 3 paintings : The Holy Family beneath the Portico, Neue Pinakothek, Munich (url)
- Godfried Schalcken (1643–1706), 10 paintings : Cephalus and Procris, Metropolitan Museum of Art, New York (url)
- Jean-Frédéric Schall (1752–1825), 4 paintings : Young Lady in a Garden, Private collection (url)
- Hans Leonhard Schäufelein (c.1480/1485–1538/1540), 1 painting : Portrait of a Man, Galleria Borghese, Rome (url)
- Bartolomeo Schedoni (1578–1615), 5 paintings : The Charity, Museo Nazionale di Capodimonte, Naples (url)
- Ary Scheffer (1795–1858), 7 paintings : Portrait of Frédéric Chopin, Musée national du château et des Trianons, Versailles (url)
- Andrea Schiavone (c. 1510 – 1563), 3 paintings : Conversion of Saul, Fondazione Querini Stampalia, Venice (url)
- Giorgio Schiavone (1436/1437–1504), 1 painting : Virgin and Child Enthroned, Staatliche Museen, Berlin (url)
- Gottlieb Schick (1776–1812), 3 paintings : Heinrike Dannecker, Nationalgalerie, Berlin (url)
- Karl Friedrich Schinkel (1781–1841), 5 paintings : The Banks of the Spree near Stralau, Nationalgalerie, Berlin (url)
- Martin Johann Schmidt (1718–1801), 5 paintings : Diana and Actaeon, National Gallery of Slovenia, Ljubljana (url)
- Jean-Victor Schnetz (1787–1870), 1 painting : The Battle for the Town Hall, 28 July 1830, Musée du Petit Palais, Paris (url)
- Julius Schnorr Von Carolsfeld (1794–1872), 5 paintings : Annunciation, Nationalgalerie, Berlin (url)
- Johann Nepomuk Schödlberger (1779–1853), 2 paintings : Ideal Landscape: Morning, Akademie der bildenden Künste, Vienna (url)
- Otto Scholderer (1834–1902), 1 painting : Violinist at the Window, Städelsches Kunstinstitut, Frankfurt (url)
- Lorenz Adolf Schönberger (1768–1847), 1 painting : Landscape with Gessner's Tomb, Akademie der bildenden Künste, Vienna (url)
- Johann Heinrich Schönfeld (1609–1683), 8 paintings : Allegory of Time (Chronos and Eros), Galleria Nazionale d'Arte Antica, Rome (url)
- Martin Schongauer (1440–1491), 1 painting : The Holy Family, Kunsthistorisches Museum, Vienna (url)
- Aelbert Jansz van der Schoor (1603–1672), 1 painting : Esther and Mordecai, Private collection (url)
- Floris van Schooten (1588–1656), 6 paintings : Breakfast, Koninklijk Museum voor Schone Kunsten, Antwerp (url)
- Hans Schöpfer the Elder (c. 1505 – 1569), 1 painting : Portraits of a Gentleman and a Lady, Private collection (url)
- Aert Schouman (1710–1792), 1 painting : Shoemaker, The Hermitage, St. Petersburg (url)
- Emile Schuffenecker (1851–1934), 2 paintings : A Cove at Concarneau, Private collection (url)
- Daniel Schultz II (c. 1615 – c. 1683), 3 paintings : Family Portrait, The Hermitage, St. Petersburg (url)
- Jacob van Schuppen (1670–1751), 2 paintings : Self-Portrait before the Easel, Akademie der bildenden Künste, Vienna (url)
- Cornelis Schut (1597–1655), 1 painting : Rape of Europa, The Hermitage, St. Petersburg (url)
- Moritz von Schwind (1804–1871), 4 paintings : Farewell at Dawn, Nationalgalerie, Berlin (url)
- Jan van Scorel (1495–1562), 17 paintings : The Baptism of Christ, Frans Halsmuseum, Haarlem (url)
- Samuel Scott (c. 1702 – 1772), 6 paintings : Part of Old Westminster Bridge, Tate Gallery, London (url)
- William Bell Scott (1811–1890), 1 painting : Albrecht Dürer on the Balcony of his House, National Gallery of Scotland, Edinburgh (url)
- William Scrots (1537–1553), 1 painting : Portrait of Maximilian II, Kunsthistorisches Museum, Vienna (url)
- Sebastiano del Piombo (1485–1547), 28 paintings : Portrait of Ferry Carondelet and his Secretaries, Museo Thyssen-Bornemisza, Madrid (url)
- Enoch Seeman (c. 1694 – 1745), 1 painting : Portrait of Henrietta Louisa Jeffreys, Private collection (url)
- Giovanni Segantini (1858–1899), 3 paintings : Ploughing, Neue Pinakothek, Munich (url)
- Corneille Seghers (1814–1869), 1 painting : A Lady and a Gentleman, The Hermitage, St. Petersburg (url)
- Daniel Seghers (1590–1661), 5 paintings : Christ and St Therese in a Garland of Flowers, Museo del Prado, Madrid (url)
- Gerard Seghers (1591–1651), 3 paintings : The Patient Job, Národní Galerie, Prague (url)
- Hercules Seghers (1589–1638), 6 paintings : Landscape with Armed Men, Museo Thyssen-Bornemisza, Madrid (url)
- Jakob Seisenegger (1504/05-1567), 2 paintings : Archduchess Maria with Her Elder Daughter Maria Eleonore, Kunsthistorisches Museum, Vienna (url)
- Vincent Sellaer (active 1538-1544–after 1544), 3 paintings : Leda with Swan and Children, Private collection (url)
- Giovanni Serodine (1600–1630), 3 paintings : Coronation of the Virgin with Saints, Parish church, Ascona (url)
- Valentin Serov (1865–1911), 10 paintings : Girl with Peaches, State Tretyakov Gallery, Moscow (url)
- Paul Sérusier (1864–1927), 2 paintings : The Talisman (The River Aven at Bois d'Amour), Musée d'Orsay, Paris (url)
- Georges Seurat (1859–1891), 31 paintings : Bathers at Asnières, National Gallery, London (url)
- Christian Seybold (c. 1690 – 1768), 3 paintings : Self-Portrait as an Old Man, Szépmûvészeti Múzeum, Budapest (url)
- James Seymour (1702–1752), 1 painting : A Hunt, Private collection (url)
- Semyon Shchedrin (1745–1804), 1 painting : Stone Bridge in Gatchina near Constable Square, State Tretyakov Gallery, Moscow (url)
- Sil'vestr Fedosyevich Shchedrin (1791–1830), 2 paintings : Terrace at Sorrento, Musée du Louvre, Paris (url)
- Martin Archer Shee (1769–1850), 2 paintings : Mr. Storer, Museo del Prado, Madrid (url)
- Jan Siberechts (1627–1703), 7 paintings : Crossing a Creek, Pushkin Museum, Moscow (url)
- Girolamo Siciolante da Sermoneta (1521–1560), 1 painting : The Holy Family, Szépmûvészeti Múzeum, Budapest (url)
- Walter Sickert (1860–1942), 2 paintings : Bathers at Dieppe, Walker Art Gallery, Liverpool (url)
- Paul Signac (1863–1935), 23 paintings : Evening Calm, Concarneau, Opus 220 (Allegro Maestoso), Metropolitan Museum of Art, New York (url)
- Francesco Signorelli (1490s–1553), 1 painting : Holy Family with Sts John, Elisabeth, and Zacharias, Private collection (url)
- Luca Signorelli (1441–1523), 4 paintings : The Holy Family with Saint, Galleria Palatina (Palazzo Pitti), Florence (url)
- Telemaco Signorini (1835–1901), 7 paintings : Insane Ward at San Bonifacio's, Florence, Museo d'Arte Moderna, Ca' Pesaro, Venice (url)
- Adam Silo (1674–1760), 3 paintings : Fleet Manoeuvres, The Hermitage, St. Petersburg (url)
- Louis de Silvestre (1675–1760), 1 painting : Christ on the Cross Formed by Clouds, Gemäldegalerie, Dresden (url)
- Simon von Taisten (1455–1530), 1 painting : St Ambrose with St Florian and St George; St Erasmus with St Margaret and St Dorothy, Private collection (url)
- Francesco Simonini (1686 – c. 1755), 1 painting : Landscape, Private collection (url)
- Henry Singleton (painter) (1766–1839), 1 painting : The Last Effort and Fall of Tippoo Sultan, Private collection (url)
- Elisabetta Sirani (1638–1665), 7 paintings : Portrait of Beatrice Cenci, Galleria Nazionale d'Arte Antica, Rome (url)
- Giovanni Andrea Sirani (1610–1670), 1 painting : Esther before Ahasuerus, Szépmûvészeti Múzeum, Budapest (url)
- Alfred Sisley (1839–1899), 43 paintings : First Snow at Louveciennes, Museum of Fine Arts, Boston (url)
- Michael Sittow (1469–1525), 5 paintings : Assumption of the Virgin, National Gallery of Art, Washington (url)
- Franz Skarbina (1849–1910), 1 painting : The Girl on the Boardwalk, Berlinische Galerie, Berlin (url)
- Stephen Slaughter (1697–1765), 1 painting : Portrait of Francis Whyte, Private collection (url)
- Antonín Slavíček (1870–1910), 1 painting : Elizabeth Bridge, Prague, Národní Galerie, Prague (url) His name is spelled incorrectly on the Web Gallery
- Maria Slavona (1865–1931), 1 painting : Houses at Montmartre, Nationalgalerie, Berlin (url)
- Max Slevogt (1868–1932), 7 paintings : Dance of Death, Germanisches Nationalmuseum, Nuremberg (url)
- Władysław Ślewiński (1856–1918), 1 painting : Rough Sea at Belle-Ile, Muzeum Narodowe, Cracow (url) His name is rendered incorrectly on the Web Gallery
- Pieter Cornelisz van Slingelandt (1640–1691), 9 paintings : Johan Hulshout, Metropolitan Museum of Art, New York (url)
- George Smith (1714–1776), 1 painting : Wooded Landscape, Private collection (url)
- Peter Snayers (1592–1666), 3 paintings : Halt of Horsemen in a Forest, The Hermitage, St. Petersburg (url)
- Frans Snyders (1579–1657), 34 paintings : Cook with Food, Wallraf-Richartz-Museum, Cologne (url)
- Il Sodoma (1477–1549), 13 paintings : Deposition from the Cross, Pinacoteca Nazionale, Siena (url)
- Gerard Soest (1600–1681), 3 paintings : William Fairfax and His Wife Elizabeth, National Portrait Gallery, London (url)
- Harald Sohlberg (1877–1935), 1 painting : Summer Night, Nasjonalgalleriet, Oslo (url)
- Andrea Solari (c. 1465 – 1524), 10 paintings : Charles d'Amboise, Musée du Louvre, Paris (url)
- Giovanni Gioseffo dal Sole (1654–1719), 2 paintings : Salome with the Head of St John the Baptist, Fitzwilliam Museum, Cambridge (url)
- Francesco Solimena (1657–1743), 15 paintings : Allegory of Reign, The Hermitage, St. Petersburg (url)
- Francisco de Solís (c. 1620 – 1684), 1 painting : Immaculate Conception, Private collection (url)
- Jan Pietersz Zomer (1641–1724), 1 painting : St Jerome, Private collection (url)
- Paul van Somer I (1577–1622), 1 painting : King James I of England, Museo del Prado, Madrid (url)
- Joris van Son (1623–1667), 5 paintings : Still-Life with Cheese, Palais des Archevêques, Tours (url)
- Isaak Soreau (1604–1644), 4 paintings : Still-Life with Chinese Bowl and Vase of Flowers, Walters Art Museum, Baltimore (url)
- Hendrik Martenszoon Sorgh (1610–1670), 5 paintings : A Kitchen, Metropolitan Museum of Art, New York (url)
- Joaquín Sorolla (1863–1923), 10 paintings : Eating on the Boat, Museo de la Real Academia de San Fernando, Madrid (url)
- Leonello Spada (1576–1622), 5 paintings : Aeneas and Anchises, Musée du Louvre, Paris (url)
- Bartolomeo Spadino (1696–1738), 1 painting : Still-Life with Fruit and Roses, Private collection (url)
- Giovanni Paolo Castelli (1659 – c. 1730), 6 paintings : Peaches and Pears in Glass Bowl, Museum of Fine Arts, Boston (url)
- Cornelis van Spaendonck (1756–1839), 2 paintings : Basket of Flowers, Ashmolean Museum, Oxford (url)
- Gerard van Spaendonck (1746–1822), 4 paintings : Vase of Flowers, Ashmolean Museum, Oxford (url)
- Hans Speckaert (1540–1581), 1 painting : Conversion of St Paul on the Road to Damascus, Musée du Louvre, Paris (url)
- Adriaen van der Spelt (1632–1673), 1 painting : Flower Still-Life with Curtain, Art Institute, Chicago (url)
- Giovanni Battista Spinelli (active from c. 1630 – c. 1660), 1 painting : Hagar and the Angel, Private collection (url)
- Carl Spitzweg (1808–1885), 5 paintings : The Convent-School Outing, Neue Pinakothek, Munich (url)
- Bartholomeus Spranger (1546–1611), 6 paintings : Adoration of the Kings, National Gallery, London (url)
- Adriaan van Stalbemt (1580–1660), 2 paintings : Landscape with Fables, Koninklijk Museum voor Schone Kunsten, Antwerp (url)
- Giovanni Stanchi (1608 – c. 1673), 3 paintings : Putto with Dragonfly Wings in a Garland, Private collection (url)
- Jan Stanisławski (1860–1907), 1 painting : Poplars beside the River, Muzeum Narodowe, Cracow (url) His name is spelled incorrectly on the Web Gallery
- Massimo Stanzione (1586–1656), 6 paintings : The Preaching of St John the Baptist in the Desert, Museo del Prado, Madrid (url)
- Sydney Starr (1857–1925), 1 painting : The City Atlas, National Gallery of Canada, Ottawa (url)
- Jan Steen (1626–1679), 60 paintings : The Sick Woman, Rijksmuseum, Amsterdam (url)
- Harmen Steenwijck (1612–1656), 6 paintings : Vanitas, Stedelijk Museum De Lakenhal, Leiden (url)
- Pieter Steenwijck (1615–1666), 1 painting : Still-Life, The Hermitage, St. Petersburg (url)
- Hendrik van Steenwijk II (1580–1649), 4 paintings : Interior of a Gothic Church, The Hermitage, St. Petersburg (url)
- Philip Wilson Steer (1860–1942), 3 paintings : Young Woman on the Beach, Walbeerswick, Musée d'Orsay, Paris (url)
- Franz Steinfeld (1787–1868), 1 painting : Dachstein with Lake Hallstatt, Residenzgalerie, Salzburg (url)
- Eduard Jakob von Steinle (1810–1886), 3 paintings : The Lorelei, Sammlung Schack, Munich (url)
- Jacques Stella (1596–1657), 2 paintings : The Liberality of Louis XIII and Cardinal Richelieu, Fogg Art Museum, Harvard University, Cambridge (url)
- Ignaz Stern (1679–1748), 1 painting : St John of Nepomuk, Private collection (url)
- Ludovico Stern (1709–1777), 1 painting : The Vision of St Filippo Neri, Private collection (url)
- Alfred Stevens (sculptor) (1817–1875), 3 paintings : Family Scene, Musée d'Orsay, Paris (url)
- Pieter Stevens II (ca. 1567-after 1624), 2 paintings : Mountain Valley with Inn and Castle, Staatliche Museen, Kassel (url)
- Joseph Karl Stieler (1781–1858), 5 paintings : Amalie von Schintling, Schloss Nymphenburg, Munich (url)
- Vrancke van der Stockt (c. 1420 – 1495), 2 paintings : Triptych of the Redemption, Museo del Prado, Madrid (url)
- Jan Jacobsz van der Stoffe (c. 1611 – 1682), 2 paintings : Battle Scene, Private collection (url)
- Antonio Stom (1688–1734), 2 paintings : View of the Piazza San Marco from the Procuratie Vecchie, Private collection (url)
- Matthias Stom (1600–1650), 11 paintings : Sarah Leading Hagar to Abraham, Staatliche Museen, Berlin (url)
- Dirk Stoop (1615–1686), 2 paintings : Landscape with Huntsmen, Private collection (url)
- Abraham Storck (1644–1708), 4 paintings : Shipping, National Gallery of Ireland, Dublin (url)
- Jacobus Storck (1641–1700), 3 paintings : View of a Harbour, The Hermitage, St. Petersburg (url)
- Sebastian Stoskopff (1597–1657), 12 paintings : Books and a Candle, Museum Boijmans Van Beuningen, Rotterdam (url)
- Stradanus (1523–1605), 3 paintings : An Alchemist's Laboratory, Palazzo Vecchio, Florence (url)
- Tobias Stranover (1684–after 1731), 5 paintings : A Jay with a Basket of Strawberries, Private collection (url)
- Hendrick van Streeck (1659–1719), 3 paintings : Imaginary Interior of a Protestant Church, Walters Art Museum, Baltimore (url)
- Juriaen van Streeck (1632–1687), 2 paintings : Snack, The Hermitage, St. Petersburg (url)
- Bernhard Strigel (1460–1528), 4 paintings : The Annunciation, Fundación Colección Thyssen-Bornemisza, Pedralbes (url)
- Abraham van Strij (1753–1826), 4 paintings : The Housewife, Rijksmuseum, Amsterdam (url)
- Jacob van Strij (1756–1815), 5 paintings : Landscape with Cattle, Metropolitan Museum of Art, New York (url)
- Thomas Stringer (1722–1790), 3 paintings : View of Poynton Hall, Cheshire, City Art Gallery, Manchester (url)
- Eduard Ströhling (1768–1826), 1 painting : Portrait of Colonel (later General Sir) George De Lacy Evans, Private collection (url)
- François Stroobant (1819–1916), 1 painting : Courtyard of the Palace of Marguerite of Austria in Mechelen, The Hermitage, St. Petersburg (url)
- Bernardo Strozzi (1581–1644), 40 paintings : Adoration of the Shepherds, Walters Art Museum, Baltimore (url)
- Gilbert Stuart (1755–1828), 1 painting : George Washington, Metropolitan Museum of Art, New York (url)
- George Stubbs (1724–1806), 7 paintings : William Anderson with Two Saddle-horses, Royal Collection, Windsor (url)
- Franz von Stuck (1863–1928), 2 paintings : Self-Portrait in the Studio, Nationalgalerie, Berlin (url)
- Pierre Subleyras (1699–1749), 13 paintings : St Ambrose Converting Theodosius, Galleria Nazionale, Perugia (url)
- Thomas Sully (1783–1872), 1 painting : Queen Victoria, Wallace Collection, London (url)
- Justus Sustermans (1597–1681), 10 paintings : Cosimo III de' Medici, Galleria Palatina (Palazzo Pitti), Florence (url)
- Friedrich Sustris (1530–1599), 1 painting : Birth of a Child, Galleria Palatina (Palazzo Pitti), Florence (url)
- Lambert Sustris (1515–1591), 5 paintings : The Baptism of the Ethiopian Eunuch by the Deacon Philip, Musée du Louvre, Paris (url)
- Joseph-Benoît Suvée (1743–1807), 3 paintings : The Combat of Mars and Minerva, Musée des Beaux-Arts, Lille (url)
- Marc-Aurèle de Foy Suzor-Coté (869–1937), 1 painting : Port-Blanc in Brittany, National Gallery of Canada, Ottawa (url)
- Francis Swaine (1730–1782), 1 painting : The Royal William (formerly the Prince), Private collection (url)
- Isaac van Swanenburg (1537–1614), 2 paintings : The Removal of the Wool from the Skins and the Combing, Stedelijk Museum De Lakenhal, Leiden (url)
- Herman van Swanevelt (1604–1655), 6 paintings : Italian Landscape with Bridge and Castle, Museum der Bildenden Künste, Leipzig (url)
- Michiel Sweerts (1618–1664), 9 paintings : The Drawing Class, Frans Halsmuseum, Haarlem (url)
- Rudolf Swoboda (1859–1914), 1 painting : A Peep at the Train, Royal Collection, Windsor (url) "Der G." may actually stand for "der Jüngere" (the Younger)
- Bertalan Székely (1835–1910), 10 paintings : Self-Portrait, Magyar Nemzeti Galéria, Budapest (url)
- Pál Szinyei Merse (1845–1920), 14 paintings : Clothes Drying, Magyar Nemzeti Galéria, Budapest (url)

== T ==
- Franz Werner von Tamm (1658–1724), 4 paintings : Flowers, Fruit, and Poultry, Liechtenstein Museum, Vienna (url)
- Tanzio da Varallo (c. 1580 – c. 1632), 5 paintings : St Jerome, Nelson-Atkins Museum of Art, Kansas City (url)
- Edmund Tarbell (1862–1938), 1 painting : The Sisters – A Study in June Sunlight, Milwaukee Art Museum, Milwaukee (url)
- Octave Tassaert (1800–1874), 2 paintings : Death of Correggio, The Hermitage, St. Petersburg (url)
- Jean Tassel (1608–1667), 2 paintings : Portrait of Catherine de Montholon, Musée des Beaux-Arts, Dijon (url)
- Agostino Tassi (1578–1644), 3 paintings : Competition on the Capitoline Hill, Pinacoteca Capitolina, Rome (url)
- Nicolas Antoine Taunay (1755–1830), 2 paintings : Country Landscape, The Hermitage, St. Petersburg (url)
- Károly Telepy (1828–1906), 3 paintings : Carthusian Monastery in the Vicinity of Rome, Magyar Nemzeti Galéria, Budapest (url)
- Abraham Lambertsz van den Tempel (1622–1672), 5 paintings : Mars Banishes 'Nering', Stedelijk Museum De Lakenhal, Leiden (url)
- Antonio Tempesta (1555–1630), 1 painting : The Death of Adonis, Galleria Sabauda, Turin (url)
- Jan Tengnagel (1584–1635), 1 painting : Vertumnus and Pomona, Rijksmuseum, Amsterdam (url)
- Abraham Teniers (1629–1670), 2 paintings : Dancing Peasants, The Hermitage, St. Petersburg (url)
- David Teniers the Elder (1582–1649), 2 paintings : The Alchemist, Galleria Palatina (Palazzo Pitti), Florence (url)
- David Teniers the Younger (1610–1690), 55 paintings : Apes in the Kitchen, The Hermitage, St. Petersburg (url)
- Gerard ter Borch (1617–1681), 54 paintings : Paternal Admonition (Gallant Conversation), Rijksmuseum, Amsterdam (url)
- Hendrick ter Brugghen (1588–1629), 31 paintings : The Adoration of the Magi, Rijksmuseum, Amsterdam (url)
- Francesco Terzi (c. 1523 – 1591), 1 painting : Archduchess Barbara, Kunsthistorisches Museum, Vienna (url)
- Pietro Testa (1611–1650), 3 paintings : Presentation of the Virgin in the Temple, The Hermitage, St. Petersburg (url)
- Henri Testelin (1616–1695), 2 paintings : Colbert Presenting the Members of the Royal Academy of Sciences to Louis XIV in 1667, Musée National du Château, Versailles (url)
- Fritz Thaulow (1847–1906), 1 painting : Night, The Hermitage, St. Petersburg (url)
- Jorge Manuel Theotokopoulos (1578–1631), 1 painting : The Family of El Greco, Museo de la Real Academia de San Fernando, Madrid (url)
- Johann Alexander Thiele (1685–1752), 1 painting : View of Dresden from the Loessnitz Heights, Gemäldegalerie, Dresden (url)
- Pieter Thijs (1624–1677), 1 painting : Portrait of Philips van de Werve and His Wife, Private collection (url)
- Daniel Thivart (1611–1656), 1 painting : Silvio and Dorinda, Szépmûvészeti Múzeum, Budapest (url)
- Hans Thoma (1839–1924), 5 paintings : Wildflowers with Porcelain Cup, Nationalgalerie, Berlin (url)
- James Thornhill (1675–1734), 1 painting : Sir Isaac Newton, Woolsthorpe Manor, Lincolnshire (url)
- Theodoor van Thulden (1606–1669), 4 paintings : Allegory of the Entry of 's Hertogenbosch and Meierij into the Union of Utrecht, Akademie der bildenden Künste, Vienna (url)
- Alessandro Tiarini (1577–1668), 2 paintings : Holy Family with Saints, The Hermitage, St. Petersburg (url)
- Pellegrino Tibaldi (1527–1596), 2 paintings : Adoration of the Christ Child, Galleria Borghese, Rome (url)
- Lodewijk Tieling (1695–1700), 2 paintings : The Ark, Metropolitan Museum of Art, New York (url)
- Jan Tilius (1653–1704), 2 paintings : Bagpipe Player Making Faces, Kunsthistorisches Museum, Vienna (url)
- Giovanni Battista Tiepolo (1696–1770), 60 paintings : The Martyrdom of St. Bartholomew, San Stae, Venice (url)
- Giovanni Domenico Tiepolo (1727–1804), 12 paintings : Ball in the Country, Metropolitan Museum of Art, New York (url)
- Gillis van Tilborch (1625–1678), 7 paintings : Family Portrait, Szépmûvészeti Múzeum, Budapest (url)
- Peter Tillemans (1684–1734), 2 paintings : A Panoramic View of Ashburnham Place, Private collection (url)
- Charles Victor Tillot (1825–1895), 1 painting : Still-Life with Flowers, Private collection (url)
- Simone del Tintore (1630–1708), 3 paintings : Still-Life of Vegetables, Private collection (url)
- Tintoretto (1518–1594), 278 paintings : The Martyrdom of the Ten Thousand (fragment), Gallerie dell'Accademia, Venice.
- Domenico Tintoretto (1560–1635), 12 paintings : Resurrection and Three Avogadri, Palazzo Ducale, Venice (url) The Web Gallery lists him under his alternate name, "Robusti"
- Johann Friedrich August Tischbein (1750–1812), 5 paintings : Nicolas Châtelain in the Garten, Neue Pinakothek, Munich (url)
- Johann Heinrich Tischbein the Elder (1722–1789), 2 paintings : The Mocking of Anacreon, Staatliche Museen, Kassel (url)
- Johann Heinrich Tischbein the Younger (1742–1808), 1 painting : Conradin of Swabia and Frederick of Baden Being Informed of Their Execution in Prison in Naples, The Hermitage, St. Petersburg (url)
- Johann Heinrich Wilhelm Tischbein (1751–1829), 4 paintings : Dance of the Fauns and the Meneads, Landesmuseum, Oldenburg (url)
- James Tissot (1836–1902), 9 paintings : Bad News (The Parting), National Museum of Wales, Cardiff (url)
- Santi di Tito (1536–1602), 5 paintings : Portrait of Henry IV of France, Museo dell'Opificio delle Pietre Dure, Florence (url)
- Tiberio di Tito (1578–1637), 4 paintings : Prince Leopoldo de' Medici in a Cradle, Galleria Palatina (Palazzo Pitti), Florence (url)
- Serafino de Tivoli (1826–1892), 1 painting : A Pasture, Galleria Palatina (Palazzo Pitti), Florence (url)
- Titian (1485–1576), 251 paintings : Christ Carrying the Cross, Scuola Grande di San Rocco, Venice (url)
- Louis Tocqué (1696–1772), 5 paintings : Portrait of Louis, Grand Dauphin of France, The Hermitage, St. Petersburg (url)
- Lodewijk Toeput (1550–1605), 2 paintings : Miraculous Fishing, The Hermitage, St. Petersburg (url)
- Gioacchino Toma (1836–1891), 1 painting : Luisa Sanfelice in Prison, Galleria Nazionale d'Arte Moderna e Contemporanea, Rome (url)
- Adolfo Tommasi (1851–1933), 1 painting : Spring, Galleria dell'Arte Moderna, Palazzo Pitti, Florence (url)
- Jacob Toorenvliet (1640–1719), 2 paintings : A Fish Seller, Private collection (url)
- Jan Toorop (1858–1928), 3 paintings : Three Women with Flowers, Haags Gemeentemuseum, The Hague (url)
- Adam-Wolfgang Töpffer (1766–1847), 4 paintings : Embarcation of the Wedding Party, Private collection (url)
- Felice Torelli (1667–1748), 2 paintings : Virgin and Child with Angels and Saints, Chiesa del Suffragio, Fano (url)
- Stefano Torelli (1712–1784), 4 paintings : Diana and Endymion, The Hermitage, St. Petersburg (url)
- János Tornyai (1869–1936), 3 paintings : Sifting Girl, Magyar Nemzeti Galéria, Budapest (url)
- Johannes van der Beeck (1589–1644), 1 painting : Emblematic Still-Life, Rijksmuseum, Amsterdam (url)
- Clemente de Torres (c. 1662 – 1730), 1 painting : The Mystic Marriage of St Catherine of Siena, Private collection (url)
- Michele Tosini (1503–1577), 1 painting : Lucretia, Private collection (url)
- Henri de Toulouse-Lautrec (1864–1901), 99 paintings : Count Alphonse de Toulouse-Lautres Driving his Coach and Four, Musée du Petit Palais, Paris (url)
- Nicolas Tournier (1590 – c. 1638), 8 paintings : Merry Company, Szépmûvészeti Múzeum, Budapest (url)
- Robert Tournières (1667–1752), 3 paintings : Concert, Musée du Louvre, Paris (url)
- Gaspare Traversi (c. 1722 – 1770), 5 paintings : The Drawing Lesson, Nelson-Atkins Museum of Art, Kansas City (url)
- Jan Jansz. Treck (1605–1652), 2 paintings : Still-Life, Szépmûvészeti Múzeum, Budapest (url)
- Pierre-Charles Trémolières (1703–1739), 1 painting : Birth of Venus, Private collection (url)
- Francesco Trevisani (1656–1746), 4 paintings : Apollo and Daphne, The Hermitage, St. Petersburg (url)
- Louis Rolland Trinquesse (1745 – c. 1800), 3 paintings : The Music Party, Alte Pinakothek, Munich (url)
- Luis Tristan (1585–1624), 4 paintings : The Adoration of the Magi, Szépmûvészeti Múzeum, Budapest (url)
- Paul Troger (1698–1762), 3 paintings : Christ Comforted by an Angel, Museo Diocesano, Bressanone (url)
- Cornelis Troost (1697–1750), 5 paintings : Three Governors of the Surgeons Guild, Amsterdam, Rijksmuseum, Amsterdam (url)
- Vasily Andreyevich Tropinin (1776–1857), 1 painting : Portrait of P.I. Sapoznikova, The Hermitage, St. Petersburg (url)
- Giovanni Battista Trotti (1555–1619), 1 painting : Portrait of a Man, Private collection (url)
- François de Troy (1645–1730), 1 painting : Portrait of Jean de Jullienne, Musée des Beaux-Arts, Valenciennes (url)
- Jean François de Troy (1679–1752), 11 paintings : The Alarm, or the Gouvernante Fidèle, Victoria and Albert Museum, London (url)
- Edward Troye (1808–1874), 2 paintings : Bertrand, by Sir Archy, Private collection (url)
- Rombout van Troyen (1605–1655), 4 paintings : Beheading of John the Baptist, The Hermitage, St. Petersburg (url)
- Constant Troyon (1810–1865), 5 paintings : Cows in the Field, The Hermitage, St. Petersburg (url)
- Wilhelm Trübner (1851–1917), 5 paintings : On the Sofa, Nationalgalerie, Berlin (url)
- John Trumbull (1756–1843), 2 paintings : Declaration of Independence, United States Capitol, Washington (url)
- Félix Trutat (1824–1848), 1 painting : Nude Girl on a Panther Skin, Musée du Louvre, Paris (url)
- Nikolaos Tsafouris (c. 1480–1501), 1 painting : Pietà, Private collection (url)
- Cosmè Tura (c. 1430 – 1495), 16 paintings : St Francis of Assisi and Announcing Angel (panels of a polyptych), National Gallery of Art, Washington (url)
- Alessandro Turchi (1578–1649), 5 paintings : Bacchus and Ariadne, The Hermitage, St. Petersburg (url)
- J. M. W. Turner (1775–1851), 26 paintings : Self-Portrait, Tate Gallery, London (url)
- Lancelot-Théodore Turpin de Crissé (1782–1859), 6 paintings : Temple of Antoninus and Faustina, Museum of Fine Arts, Boston (url)
- Laurits Tuxen (1853–1927), 2 paintings : The Family of Queen Victoria in 1887, Royal Collection, Windsor (url)
- John Henry Twachtman (1853–1902), 4 paintings : Arques-la-Bataille, Metropolitan Museum of Art, New York (url)

== U ==
- Pietro Uberti (1671–1762), 1 painting : Portraits of Three Avogadri, Palazzo Ducale, Venice (url)
- Paolo Uccello (1396–1475), 4 paintings : Portrait of a Young Man, Musée des Beaux-Arts, Chambéry (url)
- Lucas van Uden (1595–1672), 10 paintings : Landscape with the Flight into Egypt, Rockox House, Antwerp (url)
- Fritz von Uhde (1848–1911), 6 paintings : Fisher Children in Zandvoort, Neue Galerie in der Stallburg, Vienna (url)
- Jacob van der Ulft (1627–1690), 1 painting : Antique Forum with a Triumphal Procession, Wallraf-Richartz-Museum, Cologne (url)
- Cristopher Unterberger (1732–1798), 1 painting : Virgin of Sorrow Surrounded by Angels, Musée du Louvre, Paris (url)
- Michelangelo Unterberger (1695–1758), 1 painting : Visitation, Szépmûvészeti Múzeum, Budapest (url)
- Lesser Ury (1861–1931), 1 painting : Berlin Street Scene (Leipzigerstrasse), Berlinische Galerie, Berlin (url)
- Stefano Ussi (1822–1901), 1 painting : The Execution of Savonarola, Galleria Palatina (Palazzo Pitti), Florence (url)
- Adriaen van Utrecht (1599–1652), 5 paintings : Fishmonger's Stall, Museum voor Schone Kunsten, Ghent (url)
- Moses van Uyttenbroeck (1590–1648), 1 painting : Bacchanal, Herzog Anton Ulrich-Museum, Braunschweig (url)

== V ==
- Andrea Vaccaro (1604–1670), 2 paintings : Assumption of the Virgin, Private collection (url)
- Lodewijk de Vadder (1605–1655), 3 paintings : Landscape before the Rain, Národní Galerie, Prague (url)
- Pierre-Auguste Vafflard (1777–1837), 1 painting : Young Holding his Dead Daughter in his Arms, Musée Municipal, Angoulòme (url)
- Frederik van Valckenborch (1566–1623), 1 painting : Wooded River Landscape, Private collection (url)
- Gillis van Valckenborch (1570–1622), 1 painting : The Wedding of Neptune and Amphitrite, Private collection (url)
- Lucas van Valckenborch (1540–1597), 9 paintings : Landscape in Spring, Kunsthistorisches Museum, Vienna (url)
- Marten van Valckenborch (1535–1612), 1 painting : Tower of Babel, Private collection (url)
- Werner van den Valckert (1585–1645), 3 paintings : Portrait of a Man with Ring and Touchstone, Rijksmuseum, Amsterdam (url)
- Juan de Valdés Leal (1622–1690), 11 paintings : In Ictu Oculi, Hospital de la Caridad, Seville (url)
- Pierre-Henri de Valenciennes (1750–1819), 11 paintings : The Ancient City of Agrigento, Musée du Louvre, Paris (url)
- Valentin de Boulogne (1591–1632), 24 paintings : Card-sharpers, Gemäldegalerie, Dresden (url)
- Anne Vallayer-Coster (1744–1818), 3 paintings : Attributes of Painting, Sculpture, and Architecture, Musée du Louvre, Paris (url)
- Félix Vallotton (1865–1925), 2 paintings : The Bathing-Pool on a Summer Evening, Kunsthaus, Zurich (url)
- John Vanderbank (1694–1739), 1 painting : Portrait of Martin Folkes, Private collection (url)
- John Vanderlyn (1775–1852), 1 painting : Columbus Landing at Guanahani, 1492, Rotunda, US Capitol, Washington (url)
- Francesco Vanni (1563–1610), 2 paintings : St Hyacinthus Raising a Drowned Child, Musée du Louvre, Paris (url)
- Chiara Varotari (1584–after 1663), 2 paintings : Portrait of a Young Girl, Museo Civico, Padua (url)
- Giorgio Vasari (1511–1574), 21 paintings : Entombment, Casa Vasari, Arezzo (url)
- Antonio Maria Vassallo (c. 1620 – 1664/72), 1 painting : Childhood of King Cyrus, The Hermitage, St. Petersburg (url)
- Antonio Vassilacchi (1556–1629), 2 paintings : Conquest of Tyre, Palazzo Ducale, Venice (url)
- Alonso Vázquez (c. 1565 – c. 1608), 1 painting : Last Supper, Museo de Bellas Artes, Seville (url)
- Giovanni de' Vecchi (1536–1614), 1 painting : Carrying the Cross, Galleria Borghese, Rome (url)
- Pietro della Vecchia (1603–1678), 3 paintings : Portrait of Aloysio Garzoni, The Hermitage, St. Petersburg (url)
- Francesco Vecellio (1475–1559), 1 painting : Madonna and Child with Sts Joseph and John the Baptist, Private collection (url)
- Otto van Veen (1556–1629), 5 paintings : Distribution of Herring and White Bread during the Siege of Leiden, Rijksmuseum, Amsterdam (url)
- Nicolaes van Verendael (1640–1691), 1 painting : Flower Still-Life, Private collection (url)
- Philipp Veit (1793–1877), 2 paintings : Allegory of Russia, The Hermitage, St. Petersburg (url)
- Diego Velázquez (1599–1660), 123 paintings : Breakfast, The Hermitage, St. Petersburg (url)
- Adriaen van de Velde (1636–1672), 14 paintings : Amusement on the Ice, Gemäldegalerie, Dresden (url)
- Esaias van de Velde (1587–1630), 11 paintings : Ferry Boat, Rijksmuseum, Amsterdam (url)
- Henry Van De Velde (1863–1957), 2 paintings : Bathing Huts at Blankenberge, Kunsthaus, Zurich (url)
- Jan Jansz van de Velde (1620–1662), 4 paintings : Still-Life with Tall Beer Glass, Rijksmuseum, Amsterdam (url)
- Peter van de Velde (1634–1723), 1 painting : Castle on a River Bank, The Hermitage, St. Petersburg (url)
- Willem van de Velde the Elder (1611–1693), 2 paintings : The Council of War on Board 'De Zeven Provincien', the Flagship of Michiel Adriaensz de Ruyter, on 10 June 1666, Rijksmuseum, Amsterdam (url)
- Willem van de Velde the Younger (1633–1707), 22 paintings : The Battle at Texel, National Maritime Museum, Greenwich (url)
- Jacob Jansz van Velsen (1597–1656), 2 paintings : The Fortune Teller, Musée du Louvre, Paris (url)
- Adriaen van de Venne (1589–1662), 13 paintings : Dance of Death, The Hermitage, St. Petersburg (url)
- Marcello Venusti (c. 1512 – 1579), 2 paintings : The Flagellation of Christ, Galleria Borghese, Rome (url)
- Eugène Joseph Verboeckhoven (1798–1881), 1 painting : Still-Life with a Hare, The Hermitage, St. Petersburg (url)
- Louis-Charles Verboeckhoven (1802–1889), 1 painting : Harbour by Night, The Hermitage, St. Petersburg (url)
- Gaspar Peeter Verbruggen (1635–1681), 1 painting : Garland of Fruit and Flowers, Private collection (url)
- Gaspar Peeter Verbruggen the Younger (1664–1730), 7 paintings : Cartouche with Flowers, Groeninge Museum, Bruges (url)
- Dionys Verburg (1650–1712), 1 painting : Wooden Landscape with Christ and the Apostles, Private collection (url)
- Simon Pietersz Verelst (1644–c. 1710-1717), 2 paintings : Flower Still-Life, Private collection (url)
- Tobias Verhaecht (1561–1631), 2 paintings : Mountainous Landscape, Private collection (url)
- Pieter-Jozef Verhaghen (1728–1811), 2 paintings : Hagar and Ishmael Banished by Abraham, Koninklijk Museum voor Schone Kunsten, Antwerp (url)
- Jan Verkolje (1650–1693), 3 paintings : The Messenger, Mauritshuis, The Hague (url)
- Nikolaas Verkolje (1673–1746), 2 paintings : Dido and Aeneas, J. Paul Getty Museum, Los Angeles (url)
- Jan Vermeer van Haarlem the Elder (1628–1691), 1 painting : View of Haarlem from the Dunes, Museo Thyssen-Bornemisza, Madrid (url)
- Jan Vermeer van Haarlem (1656–1705), 1 painting : Wooded Landscape, Private collection (url)
- Barend van der Meer (1659–1695), 1 painting : Still-Life, Private collection (url)
- Johannes Vermeer (1632–1675), 109 paintings : Christ in the House of Martha and Mary, National Gallery of Scotland, Edinburgh (url)
- Jan Vermeulen (fl. 1638–1674), 1 painting : Vanitas Still-Life, Private collection (url)
- Jan Cornelisz Vermeyen (1500–1559), 11 paintings : Jean Carondelet, Brooklyn Museum, New York (url)
- Giuseppe Vermiglio (ca. 1585-after 1635), 1 painting : St Margaret, Private collection (url)
- Carle Vernet (1758–1836), 6 paintings : Napoleon on a Hunt in the Forest of Compiègne, The Hermitage, St. Petersburg (url)
- Claude Joseph Vernet (1714–1789), 26 paintings : Seascape: Calm, Musée du Louvre, Paris (url)
- Horace Vernet (1789–1863), 16 paintings : The Gate at Clichy, Musée du Louvre, Paris (url)
- Paolo Veronese (1528–1588), 196 paintings : Raising of the Daughter of Jairus, Musée du Louvre, Paris (url)
- Andrea del Verrocchio (1435–1488), 2 paintings : The Baptism of Christ, Galleria degli Uffizi, Florence (url)
- Johannes Cornelisz Verspronck (1600–1662), 7 paintings : Portrait of a Bride, Galleria Nazionale d'Arte Antica, Rome (url)
- Anthonie Verstraelen (c. 1594 – 1641), 2 paintings : Winter Landscape, Mauritshuis, The Hague (url)
- Daniel Vertangen (1600–1682), 2 paintings : Portrait of Jan Valckenburgh, Rijksmuseum, Amsterdam (url)
- Abraham de Verwer (1585–1650), 2 paintings : Battle of Zuiderzee, 6 October 1573, Rijksmuseum, Amsterdam (url)
- Justus de Verwer (1625–1689), 1 painting : River Estuary, Private collection (url)
- Domenico Maria Viani (1668–1711), 1 painting : Jupiter Bids Ceres Farewell, Akademie der bildenden Künste, Vienna (url)
- Giovanni Maria Viani (1636–1700), 2 paintings : Circumcision, Private collection (url)
- Andrea Vicentino (1539–1614), 5 paintings : Battle of Lepanto, Palazzo Ducale, Venice (url)
- Jan Victors (1619–1676), 8 paintings : Abraham's Parting from the Family of Lot, Metropolitan Museum of Art, New York (url)
- Eugène Vidal (1847–1907), 1 painting : Girl Resting on Her Arms, Private collection (url)
- Joseph-Marie Vien (1716–1809), 8 paintings : La Marchande d'Amours, Musée National du Château, Fontainebleau (url)
- Louise Élisabeth Vigée Le Brun (1755–1842), 21 paintings : The Daughter's Portrait, Galleria Nazionale, Parma (url)
- Jacopo Vignali (1592–1664), 2 paintings : Portrait of Alessandro Strozzi, Called Beato Alessio, Private collection (url)
- Claude Vignon (1593–1670), 6 paintings : Croesus Receiving Tribute from a Lydian Peasant, Musée des Beaux-Arts, Tours (url)
- Victor Vignon (1847–1909), 2 paintings : The Crossroads, Private collection (url)
- Antonio Viladomat y Manalt (1678–1755), 1 painting : The Death of St Anthony the Hermit, Szépmûvészeti Múzeum, Budapest (url)
- Rodrigo de Villandrando (active from 1608 to 1622), 4 paintings : Isabel of France, Museo del Prado, Madrid (url)
- François-André Vincent (1746–1816), 3 paintings : Belisarius, Musée Fabre, Montpellier (url)
- David Vinckboons (1576–1629), 10 paintings : Distribution of Loaves to the Poor, Rockox House, Antwerp (url)
- Francesco Vinea (1845–1902), 1 painting : Michelangelo Reads his Poetry in the House of Aldovrandi, Galleria dell'Arte Moderna, Palazzo Pitti, Florence (url)
- Vincent van der Vinne (1628–1702), 1 painting : Vanitas with a Royal Crown, Musée du Louvre, Paris (url)
- Vincent Laurensz van der Vinne II (1686–1742), 1 painting : The Courtyard of the Proveniershof, Frans Halsmuseum, Haarlem (url)
- Giovanni Battista Viola (1576–1622), 2 paintings : Landscape with a Devotional Image, Galleria Doria Pamphilj, Rome (url)
- Antonio Visentini (1688–1782), 1 painting : Architectural Fantasy, Gallerie dell'Accademia, Venice (url)
- Ivan Yakovlevich Vishnyakov (1699–1761), 1 painting : Portrait of S.S. Yakovleva, The Hermitage, St. Petersburg (url)
- Timoteo Viti (1469–1523), 1 painting : Madonna and Child with the Infant St John the Baptist, Private collection (url)
- Alvise Vivarini (1445–1503), 6 paintings : Altarpiece of St Ambrose, Santa Maria Gloriosa dei Frari, Venice (url)
- Joseph Vivien (1657–1734), 2 paintings : Fénélon, Archbishop of Cambrai, Alte Pinakothek, Munich (url)
- Nicolas Vleughels (1668–1737), 3 paintings : Apelles Painting Campaspe, Musée du Louvre, Paris (url)
- Simon de Vlieger (1600–1653), 13 paintings : Beach near Scheveningen with Fish-Sellers, Wallraf-Richartz-Museum, Cologne (url)
- Hendrick Cornelisz. van Vliet (1611–1675), 12 paintings : Church Interior, Museum voor Schone Kunsten, Ghent (url)
- Willem van der Vliet (1584–1642), 3 paintings : Philosopher and Pupils, National Trust for Scotland, Brodie Castle (url)
- Jacob Ferdinand Voet (1639–1689), 5 paintings : Portrait of Maria Mancini, Rijksmuseum, Amsterdam (url)
- Carl Christian Vogel von Vogelstein (1788–1868), 1 painting : Portrait of Friedrich IV, Duke of Saxe-Gotha-Altenburg, Private collection (url)
- Christian Leberecht Vogel (1759–1816), 1 painting : The Artist's Sons, Private collection (url)
- Paul Vogler (1852–1904), 2 paintings : The Moulin de la Galette, Private collection (url)
- Guillaume Voiriot (1713–1799), 3 paintings : Portrait of M. Gilbert Desvoisins, Councillor of State in Ordinary, Private collection (url)
- Ary de Vois (1641 – c. 1680), 2 paintings : Portrait of a Notary, The Hermitage, St. Petersburg (url)
- Pierre-Jacques Volaire (1729–1792 (?) ), 4 paintings : The Eruption of the Vesuvius, Musée du Louvre, Paris (url)
- Robert Vonnoh (1858–1933), 1 painting : Poppies, Museum of Art, Indianapolis (url)
- Hendrik Voogd (1768–1839), 1 painting : View of the Roman Campagna, Private collection (url)
- Cornelis de Vos (1584–1651), 10 paintings : Portrait of a Boy, Akademie der bildenden Künste, Vienna (url)
- Marten de Vos (1532–1603), 11 paintings : Portrait of Antonius Anselmus, His Wife and Their Children, Royal Museums of Fine Arts of Belgium, Brussels (url)
- Paul de Vos (1593–1678), 6 paintings : Bear Hunt, The Hermitage, St. Petersburg (url)
- Simon de Vos (1603–1676), 5 paintings : Allegorical Scene, Národní Galerie, Prague (url)
- Daniel Vosmaer (1650–1666), 4 paintings : The Harbour of Delft, Museo de Arte de Ponce, Ponce, Puerto Rico (url)
- Jacob Vosmaer (1574–1641), 3 paintings : A Vase with Flowers, Metropolitan Museum of Art, New York (url)
- Simon Vouet (1590–1649), 38 paintings : Self-Portrait, Musée Réattu, Arles (url)
- Sebastian Vrancx (1573–1647), 8 paintings : Ambush, Národní Galerie, Prague (url)
- Hans Vredeman de Vries (1527–1607), 3 paintings : Architectural Landscape, The Hermitage, St. Petersburg (url)
- Nicolaes de Vree (1645–1702), 2 paintings : Statue in a Park, The Hermitage, St. Petersburg (url)
- Jacob Vrel (1654–1662), 3 paintings : The Hospital Orderly, Koninklijk Museum voor Schone Kunsten, Antwerp (url)
- Abraham de Vries (1590–1655), 2 paintings : Self-Portrait, Rijksmuseum, Amsterdam (url)
- Roelof Jansz van Vries (1630–1690), 1 painting : The Pigeon House, Metropolitan Museum of Art, New York (url)
- Cornelis Vroom (1591–1661), 4 paintings : Landscape with Estuary, Frans Halsmuseum, Haarlem (url)
- Hendrick Cornelisz Vroom (1563–1640), 10 paintings : The Arrival at Vlissingen of the Elector Palatinate Frederick V, Frans Halsmuseum, Haarlem (url)
- Édouard Vuillard (1868–1940), 4 paintings : In Bed, Musée d'Orsay, Paris (url)
- Victoria Gent (1991 BD) 7 paintings: Life of the Ghetto, Life of a Cow, The Odessa, Trials of a Goirl URL

== W ==
- Cornelis de Wael (1592–1667), 3 paintings : A Camp by the Ruins, The Hermitage, St. Petersburg (url)
- Richard Waitt (died 1732), 3 paintings : The Cromartie Fool, National Gallery of Scotland, Edinburgh (url)
- Ferdinand Georg Waldmüller (1793–1865), 16 paintings : The Birthday Table, Wallraf-Richartz-Museum, Cologne (url)
- Goffredo Wals (c. 1605 – c. 1638), 3 paintings : Landscape with Christ and St Peter, National Gallery of Scotland, Edinburgh (url)
- Jacob van Walscapelle (1644–1727), 2 paintings : Flowers in a Stone Vase, Städelsches Kunstinstitut, Frankfurt (url)
- Edward Arthur Walton (1860–1922), 1 painting : Reverie, National Gallery of Scotland, Edinburgh (url)
- James Ward (1769–1859), 3 paintings : Gordale Scar, Tate Gallery, London (url)
- Friedrich Wasmann (1805–1886), 1 painting : Paul, Maria, and Filomena von Putzer, Nationalgalerie, Berlin (url)
- John William Waterhouse (1849–1917), 1 painting : The Lady of Shalott, Tate Gallery, London (url)
- Antoine Watteau (1684–1721), 54 paintings : The Country Dance, Museum of Art, Indianapolis (url)
- Louis Joseph Watteau (1731–1798), 1 painting : The Storm, Musée des Beaux-Arts, Valenciennes (url)
- Frederick W. Watts (1800–1870), 1 painting : River Landscape, Private collection (url)
- John Webber (1751–1793), 1 painting : Portrait of Poedua, National Maritime Museum, London (url)
- Henrik Weber (1818–1866), 4 paintings : The Weber Family, Kiscelli Museum, Budapest (url)
- Jan Weenix (1640–1719), 15 paintings : An Italian Seaport, Staatliche Museen, Kassel (url)
- Jan Baptist Weenix (1621–1661), 5 paintings : Ancient Ruins, Szépmûvészeti Múzeum, Budapest (url)
- J. Alden Weir (1852–1919), 2 paintings : The Red Bridge, Metropolitan Museum of Art, New York (url)
- Albert Weisgerber (1878–1915), 1 painting : Riding in the English Gardens, Munich, Saarländisches Landesmuseum, Saarbrücken (url)
- Johan Hendrik Weissenbruch (1824–1903), 1 painting : View of Haarlem, Haags Gemeentemuseum, The Hague (url)
- Erik Werenskiold (1855–1938), 2 paintings : Autumn, Konstmuseum, Gothenburg (url)
- Adriaen van der Werff (1659–1722), 17 paintings : Amorous Couple Spied upon by Children, Rijksmuseum, Amsterdam (url)
- Pieter van der Werff (1665–1722), 5 paintings : Granida and Diafilo, Wallraf-Richartz-Museum, Cologne (url)
- Joseph Werner (1637–1710), 1 painting : Diana, Private collection (url)
- Hans Wertinger (c. 1465 – 1533), 1 painting : Crucifixion with Saints and Donor, The Hermitage, St. Petersburg (url)
- Benjamin West (1738–1820), 13 paintings : Agrippina Landing at Brundisium with the Ashes of Germanicus, Yale University Art Gallery, New Haven (url)
- Richard Westall (1765–1836), 1 painting : Emma Hamilton as a Bacchante, Private collection (url)
- Victor Westerholm (1860–1919), 1 painting : The Seine at Paris, Turun Taidemuseo, Turku (url)
- Gerrit de Wet (1620–1674), 2 paintings : Finding of Moses in the Nile, Amstelkring Museum, Amsterdam (url)
- Jacob Willemszoon de Wet (1610–1675), 3 paintings : The Calling of St Peter and St Andrew, Private collection (url)
- Goswin van der Weyden (1455–1543), 2 paintings : The Gift of Kalmthout, Staatliche Museen, Berlin (url)
- Rogier van der Weyden (1400–1464), 152 paintings : Deposition, Museo del Prado, Madrid (url)
- Francis Wheatley (1747–1801), 2 paintings : A Ploughman, Private collection (url)
- James McNeill Whistler (1834–1903), 8 paintings : The Artist's Mother, Musée d'Orsay, Paris (url)
- Thomas Whitcombe (c. 1752 – 1824), 1 painting : A Navy Yacht Flying the White Ensign, Private collection (url)
- Cornelis Claesz van Wieringen (1580–1633), 1 painting : Capture of Damiate, Frans Halsmuseum, Haarlem (url)
- Antoine Wiertz (1806–1865), 2 paintings : Two Young Girls or the Beautiful Rosine, Musée Wiertz, Brussels (url)
- Thomas Wijck (1616–1677), 4 paintings : An Alchemist, The Hermitage, St. Petersburg (url)
- Jan Wildens (1595–1653), 3 paintings : Landscape with Shepherds, Koninklijk Museum voor Schone Kunsten, Antwerp (url)
- David Wilkie (1785–1841), 7 paintings : Chelsea Pensioners Reading the Waterloo Dispatch, Wellington Museum, Apsley House, London (url)
- Abraham Willaerts (1603–1669), 5 paintings : Cornelis Tromp in Roman Costume, Rijksmuseum, Amsterdam (url)
- Adam Willaerts (1577–1664), 3 paintings : Coastal Landscape with Ships, Liechtenstein Museum, Vienna (url)
- Isaac Willaerts (1620–1693), 1 painting : Coastal Landscape, Private collection (url)
- Peter Willebeeck (1632–1646), 1 painting : Still-Life, Rockox House, Antwerp (url)
- Richard Wilson (1713/1714–1782), 5 paintings : The Mawddach Valley and Cader Idris, Walker Art Gallery, Liverpool (url)
- Carl Wimar (1828–1862), 1 painting : The Lost Trail, Museo Thyssen-Bornemisza, Madrid (url)
- Josef Winterhalder the Younger (1743–1807), 1 painting : Faith, Hope and Charity, Christian Museum, Esztergom (url)
- Franz Xaver Winterhalter (1805–1873), 5 paintings : The First of May 1851, Royal Collection, Windsor (url)
- Jacob de Wit (1695–1754), 9 paintings : Adoration of the Shepherds (detail), Amstelkring Museum, Amsterdam (url)
- Matthias Withoos (1627–1703), 2 paintings : View of Amersfoort, Museum Flehite, Amersfoort (url)
- Heerman Witmont (1605–1684), 1 painting : Action between Dutch and English Ships, National Maritime Museum, Greenwich (url)
- Emanuel de Witte (1617–1692), 25 paintings : The Old Fish Market on the Dam, Amsterdam, Museo Thyssen-Bornemisza, Madrid (url)
- Gaspar van Wittel (1653–1736), 20 paintings : View of Rome, The Hermitage, St. Petersburg (url)
- Johann Michael Wittmer (1802–1880), 1 painting : Raphael's First Sketch of the 'Madonna della Sedia', Royal Collection, Windsor (url)
- Artus Wolffort (1581–1641), 1 painting : St Andrew, Private collection (url)
- Michael Wolgemut (1434–1519), 1 painting : Portrait of Levinus Memminger, Thyssen-Bornemisza Museum, Madrid (url)
- John Wootton (c. 1682 – 1764), 4 paintings : Hounds and a Magpie, The Hermitage, St. Petersburg (url)
- Thomas Worlidge (1700–1766), 1 painting : Portrait of David Garrick, Private collection (url)
- Frans Wouters (1612–1659), 1 painting : Cloelia and Her Companions Escaping from the Etruscans, Private collection (url)
- Philips Wouwerman (1619–1668), 28 paintings : Two Horses, Museo del Prado, Madrid (url)
- Pieter Wouwerman (1623–1682), 1 painting : Deer Hunt, The Hermitage, St. Petersburg (url)
- John Michael Wright (1617–1694), 2 paintings : Portrait of the John Maitland, Private collection (url)
- Joseph Wright of Derby (1734–1797), 13 paintings : Experiment with the Air Pump, National Gallery, London (url)
- Joachim Wtewael (1566–1638), 14 paintings : The Battle Between the Gods and the Titans, Art Institute, Chicago (url)
- Peter Wtewael (1596–1660), 3 paintings : Denial of Peter, Museum of Art, Cleveland (url)
- Michael Wutky (1739–1822), 4 paintings : The Summit of Vesuvius Erupting, Akademie der bildenden Künste, Vienna (url)
- Jan Wyck (1644–1702), 4 paintings : William III Landing at Brixham, Torbay, National Maritime Museum, London (url)
- Jan Wijnants (1632–1684), 7 paintings : A Hilly Landscape, Wallace Collection, London (url)

== Y ==
- Fernando Yáñez de la Almedina (1505–1536), 3 paintings : Saint Catherine, Museo del Prado, Madrid (url)

== Z ==
- Bernardino di Bosio Zaganelli (1465–1511), 2 paintings : Portrait of a Lady, Liechtenstein Museum, Vienna (url)
- Francesco di Bosio Zaganelli (1475–1531), 1 painting : The Christ Child between Sts Catherine, Francis and Elizabeth of Hungary, Private collection (url)
- Giuseppe Zais (1709–1781), 8 paintings : Ancient Ruins with a Great Arch and a Column, Gallerie dell'Accademia, Venice (url)
- Antonio Zanchi (1631–1722), 5 paintings : Abraham Teaching Astrology to the Egyptians, Santa Maria del Giglio, Venice (url)
- Federico Zandomeneghi (1841–1917), 8 paintings : Palazzo Pretorio in Florence, Museo d'Arte Moderna, Ca' Pesaro, Venice (url)
- Sergey Konstantinovich Zaryanko (1818–1871), 2 paintings : The Fieldmarshals' Hall in the Winter Palace, The Hermitage, St. Petersburg (url)
- Cornelis de Zeeuw (1558–1569), 1 painting : Portrait of the De Moucheron Family, Rijksmuseum, Amsterdam (url)
- Giovanni Battista Zelotti (1526–1578), 36 paintings : Dead Christ, Basilica dei Santi Giovanni e Paolo, Venice (url)
- Mihály Zichy (1827–1906), 3 paintings : Lifeboat, Magyar Nemzeti Galéria, Budapest (url)
- Carl Friedrich Zimmermann (1796–1820), 1 painting : Armour Room in the Palace of Prince Frederick of Prussia, Schloss Charlottenburg, Berlin (url)
- Giuseppe Zocchi (1711/1717–1767), 3 paintings : The Piazza della Signoria in Florence, Private collection (url)
- Johann Zoffany (1733–1810), 8 paintings : Portrait of Ann Brown in the Role of Miranda, Museo Thyssen-Bornemisza, Madrid (url)
- Anders Zorn (1860–1920), 4 paintings : Midsummer's Day Dance, Nationalmuseum, Stockholm (url)
- Francesco Zuccarelli (1702–1788), 10 paintings : Bacchanal, Gallerie dell'Accademia, Venice (url)
- Federico Zuccari (1541–1609), 4 paintings : Assumption of the Virgin, Museo Diocesano, Cortona (url)
- Andrea Zucchi (1679–1740), 1 painting
- Antonio Zucchi (1726–1796), 2 paintings
- Francesco Zucchi (1692–1764), 2 paintings : Composite Head, Museo Nazionale di Capodimonte, Naples (url)
- Jacopo Zucchi (c. 1540 – c. 1596), 11 paintings : The Coral Fishers, Galleria Borghese, Rome (url)
- Lorenzo Zucchi (1704–1779) 2 paintings
- Francesco Zugno (1709–1787), 3 paintings : The Sleeping Rinaldo, Rijksmuseum, Amsterdam (url)
- Ignacio Zuloaga (1870–1945), 2 paintings : Celestina, Centro de Arte Reina Sofía, Madrid (url)
- Francisco de Zurbarán (1598–1664), 46 paintings : St Agatha, Musée Fabre, Montpellier (url)
- Juan de Zurbarán (1620–1649), 1 painting : Still-Life with Plate of Apples and Orange Blossom, Private collection (url)

== See also ==
- List of sculptors in the Web Gallery of Art
- List of graphic artists in the Web Gallery of Art
