= Musée Bossuet =

Museum in Meaux, France

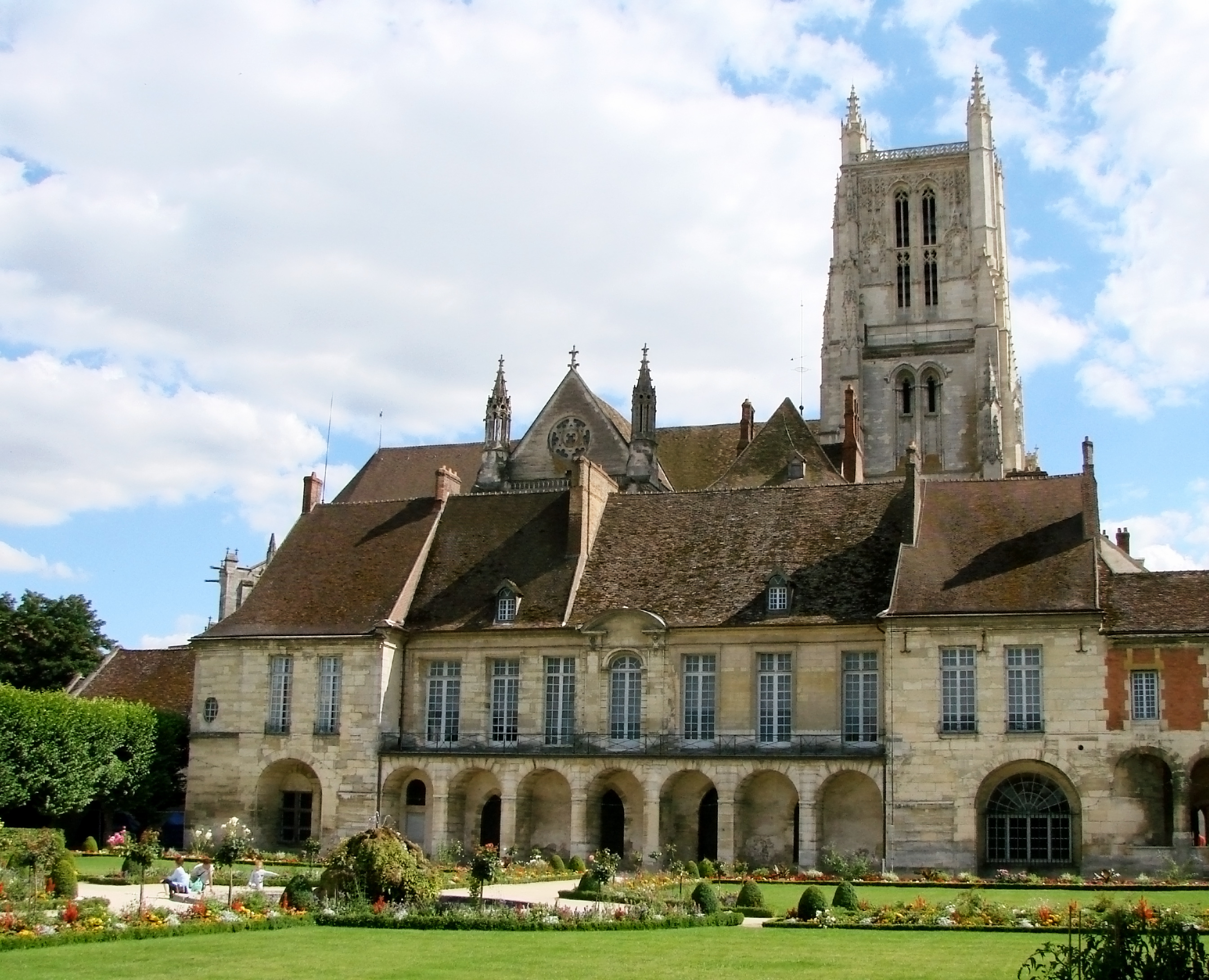
- View of the museum from the garden

- Location within France
- Established: 1927
- Location: Meaux, Ile-de-France, France
- Coordinates: 48.960698°N 2.878316°E
- Collection size: Paintings, sculpture and decorative arts
- Website: www.musee-bossuet.fr

The Musée Bossuet is the art and history museum of the town of Meaux, France. Situated in the old episcopal palace, it takes its name from the famous orator and theologian, Jacques-Bénigne Bossuet, Bishop of Meaux from 1681 to 1704.

== Buildings ==
=== The episcopal palace ===
Built in the twelfth century around 1160, then rebuilt in the seventeenth century, the episcopal palace architecturally is a mix of medieval and Renaissance styles. The most interesting example of eighteenth century work is the south facade of the palace, built of brick and stone, with large cross windows. The north facade is also representative of the Grand Siècle style. The lower rooms of the palace are the oldest, dating from the second half of the twelfth century. The low and high chapels also date from this time, but were expanded and redesigned in the fifteenth century.

=== Garden ===
The Bossuet garden is beside the episcopal palace. It is a formal garden in the French style with the shape of a miter. The garden was created in the seventeenth century during the episcopate of Dominique Séguier. It took the name of the great prelate in 1911, when it was opened to the public as a city park. On crossing it one reaches the study of Jacques-Bénigne Bossuet.

== Collections ==
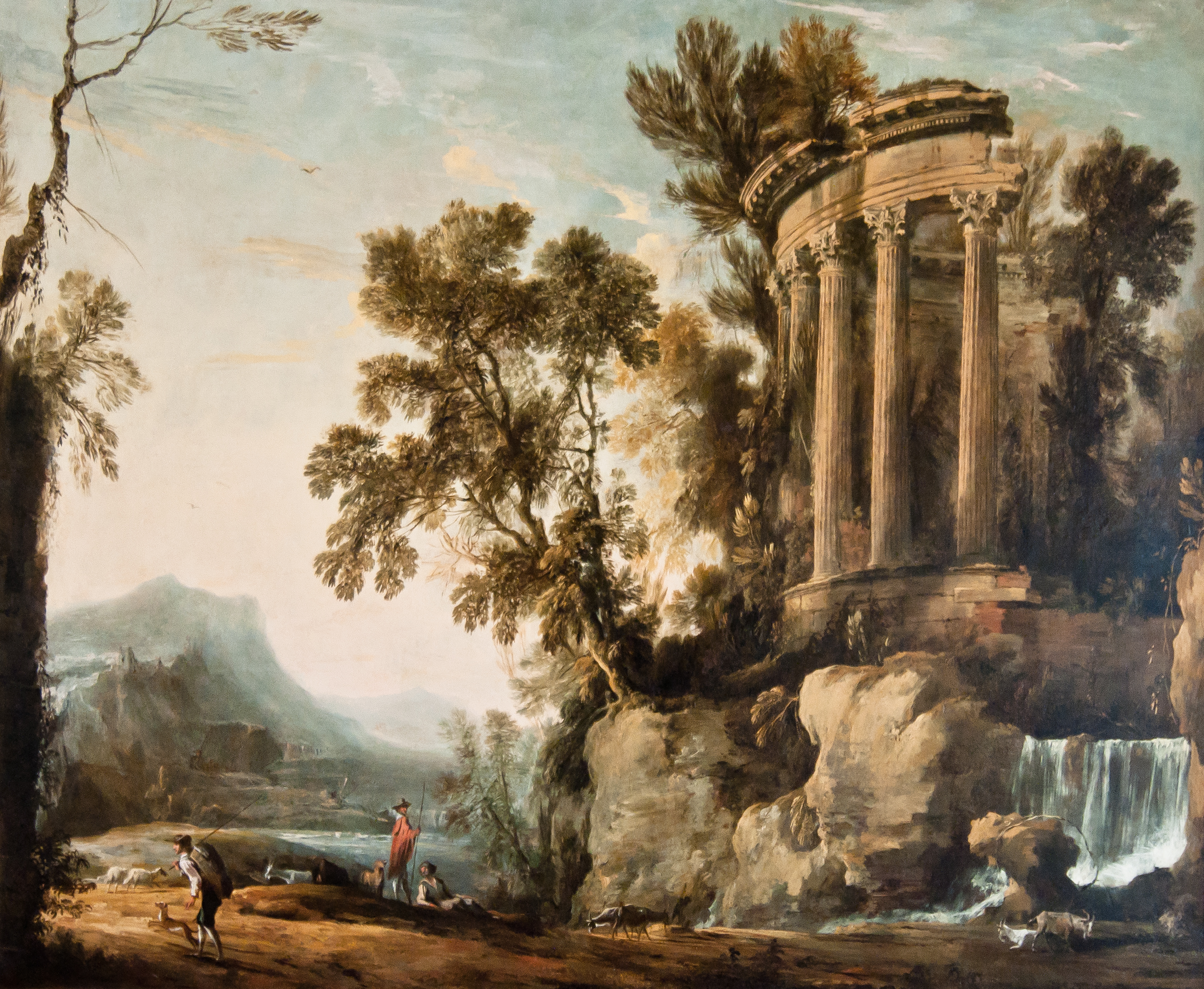
Henri Mauperché: Landscape with the temple of the Sybil

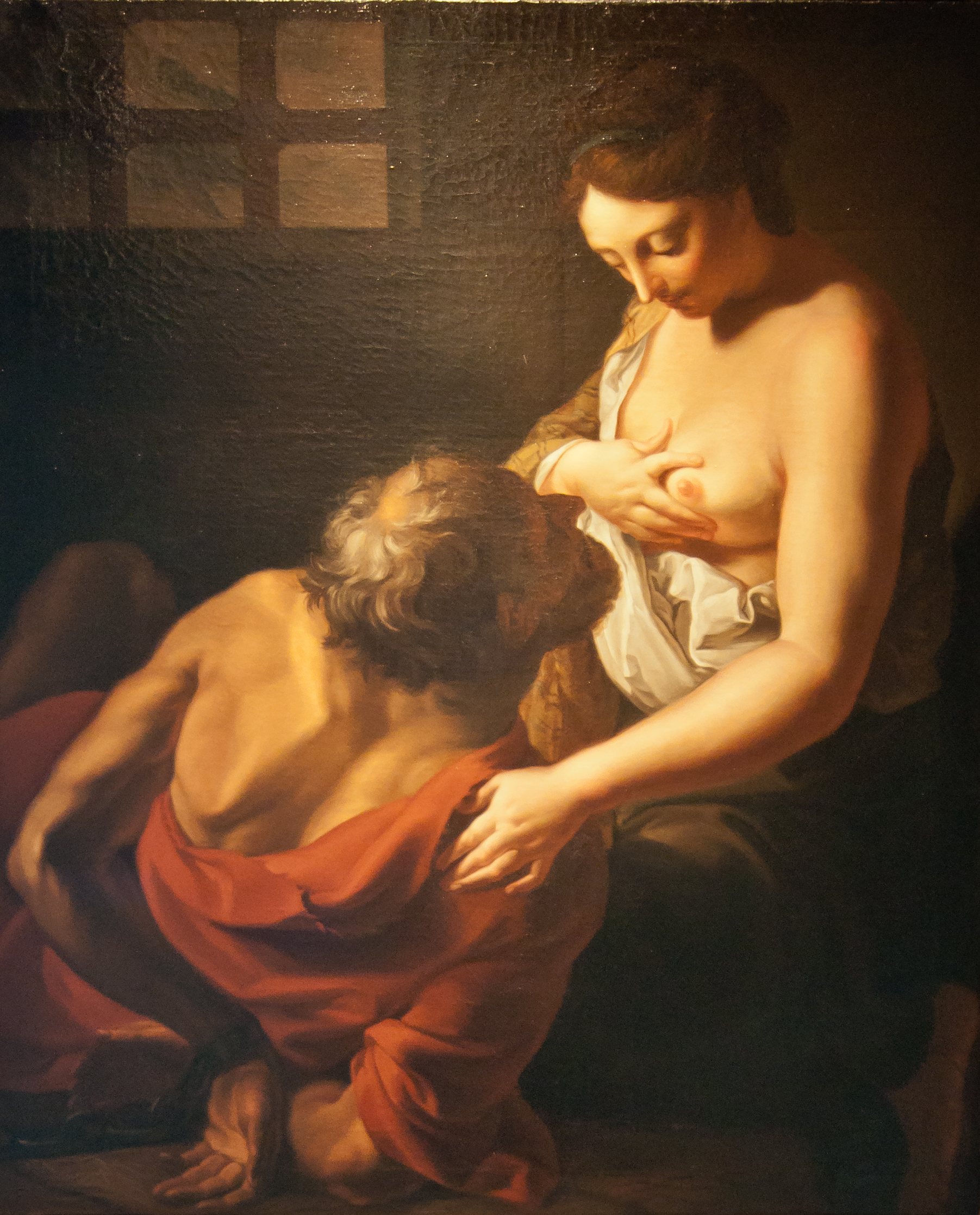
Antoine Rivalz: Charity

The episcopal palace houses collections of paintings and sculptures, as well as items of local history. The collections have expanded thanks to the legacy of the chemist and collector Henri Moissan in 1914 and, more recently, thanks to the donation of the neuro-biologist Jean-Pierre Changeux. He enriched the museum with forty works, the last of which entered the collection in 2006. Different schools of painting are shown from the sixteenth to the twentieth centuries.

- The sixteenth and seventeenth centuries are very well represented with canvasses of religious subjects by Frans Floris and Bon Boullogne as well as works of Gianfrancesco Penni, Giuseppe Cesari, Domenichino, Claude Deruet, Claude Vignon, Jean Tassel, Jacques Blanchard, the Le Nain brothers (L'Adoration des Mages), Henri Mauperché, Sébastien Bourdon (Saint Martin ressuscitant un jeune homme and Laban cherchant ses idoles), Noël Coypel and Jacques Courtois (two battle scenes), Charles de La Fosse and Hyacinthe Rigaud.
- From the eighteenth century there as mythological scenes by François-Alexandre Verdier, François de Troy, Antoine Rivalz, Charles-Antoine Coypel, François Lemoyne, Jean Restout the Younger, Charles-André van Loo, Jean-Baptiste Marie Pierre, Philip James de Loutherbourg, Jacques Gamelin and Jean-Baptiste Regnault.
- The nineteenth century is represented by landscapes from the Barbizon school and a fine collection of paintings of the orientalists.
- Sculptures include some by anonymous medieval artists and works by artists such as Edmé Bouchardon and Louis-Ernest Barrias from the nineteenth century.

== Rooms ==
=== Access ramp: Bishops of Meaux ===
There are many pictures of the successive Bishops of Meaux along the access ramp.

=== Rooms 1 and 2: Mannerism ===
- In Europe: Giuseppe Cesari
- Frans Floris, Jean Senelle

=== Rooms 3 and 4: Classical period ===
- Preclassicism
- Le Grand Siècle

=== Rooms 5 and 6: Eighteenth century ===
- Mythology
- Neo-Classicism

=== Room 7: Bossuet ===
The memory of Bishop Bossuet of Meaux (1682-1704) is evoked by his portraits by Hyacinthe Rigaud and after Pierre Mignard gathered in his old study.

=== Rooms 8 and 9 : The nineteenth century ===
- Orientalism and realism
- Romanticism

== Gallery ==
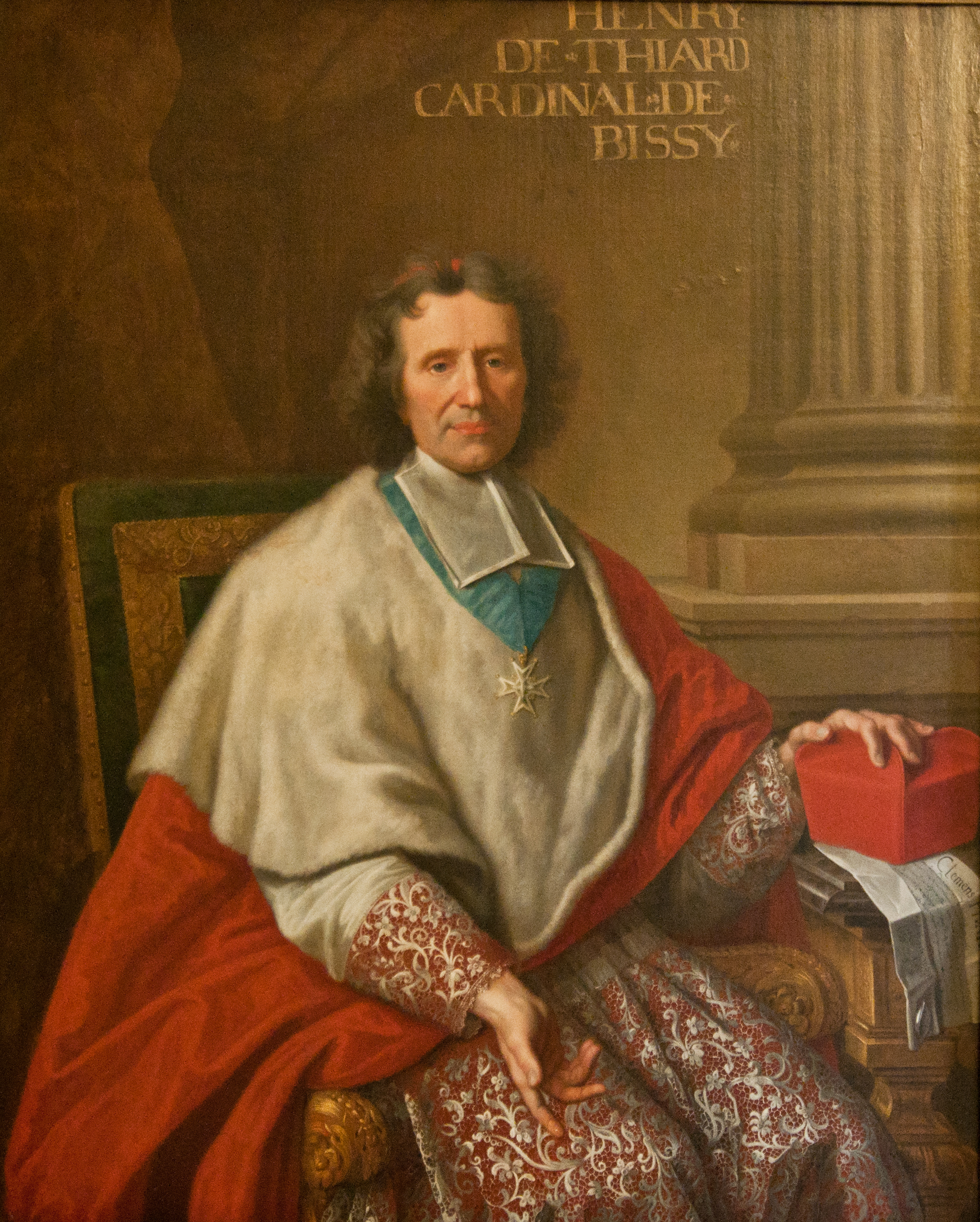
Portrait of Cardinal Henri-Pons de Thiard de Bissy (1657-1737). Anonymous

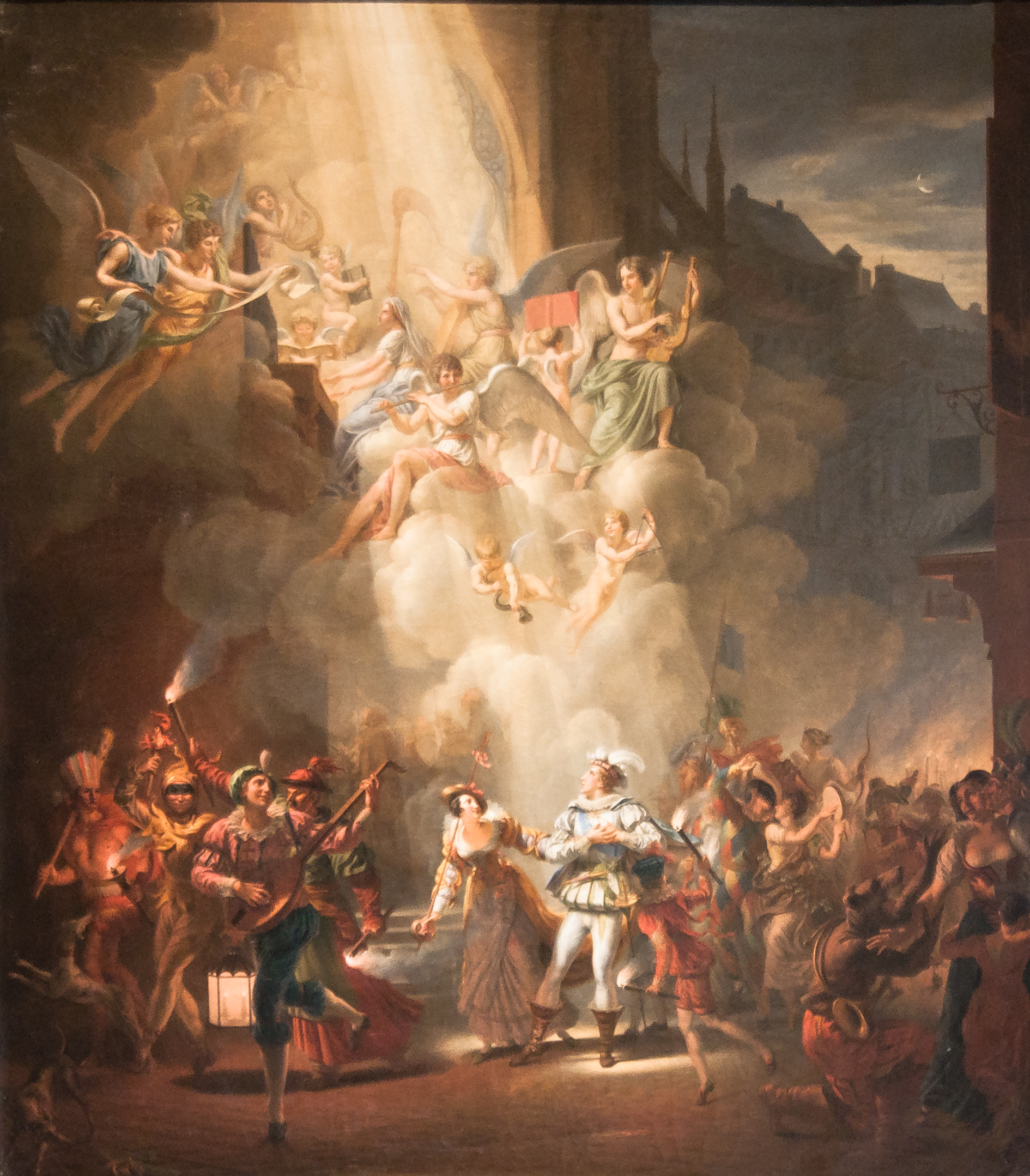
The Conversion of Henri, Duke of Joyeuse. Jean Tardieu, around 1819

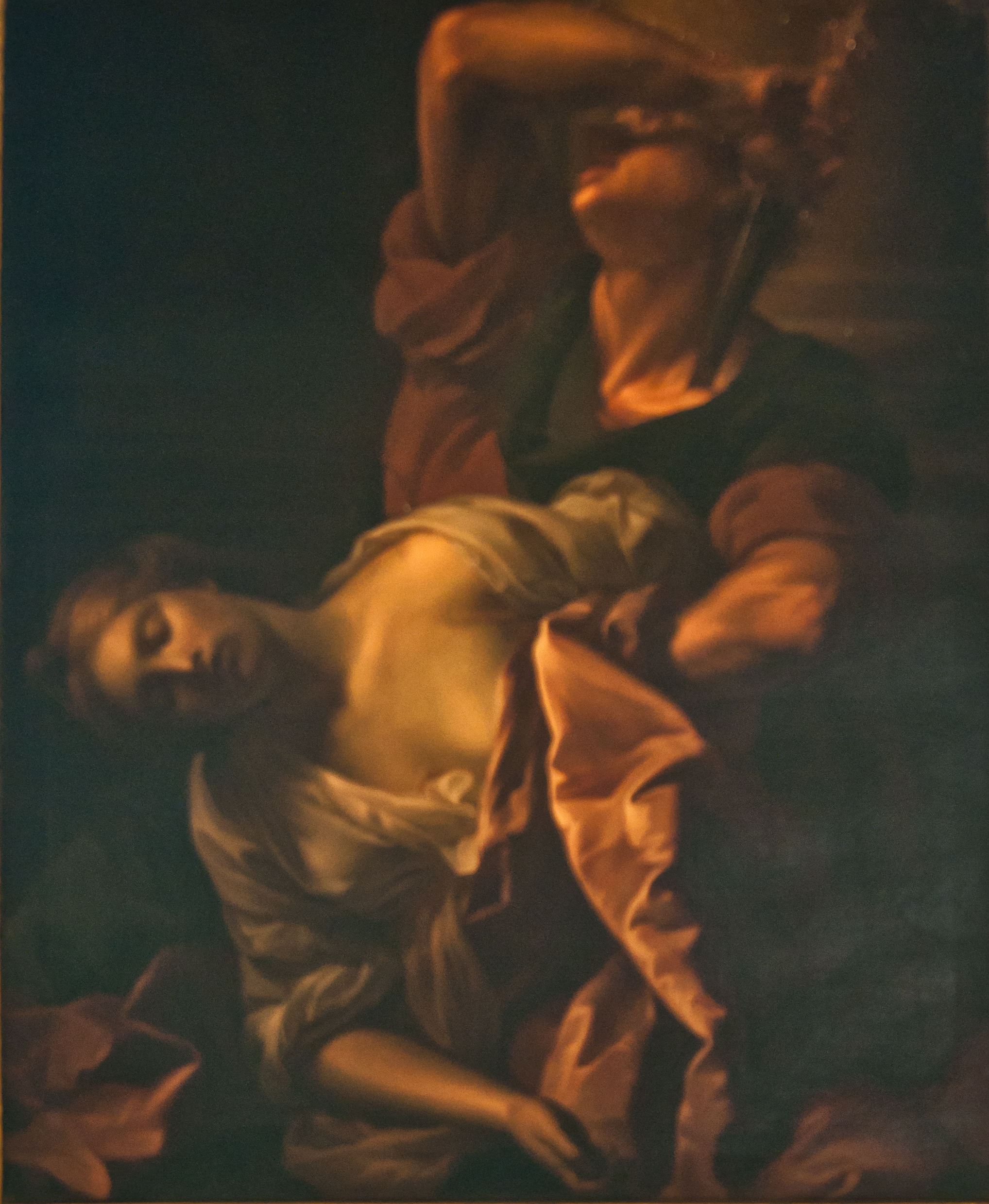
"La mort de Paetus", oil on canvas, by Antoine Rivalz
