= Mathieu Barathier =

French painter, engraver and lithographer

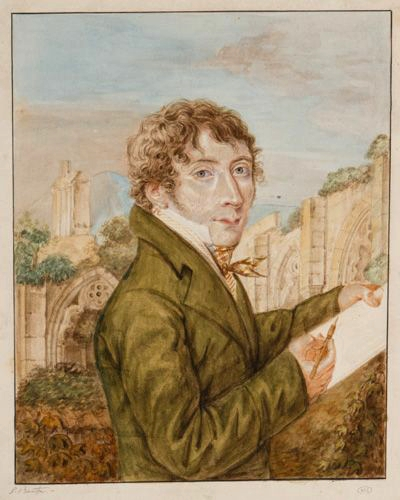
- Mathieu Barathier; by Pascal Barthe
- Born: 23 March 1784; Narbonne, France
- Died: 6 January 1867 (aged 82); Narbonne, France
- Education: Jacques Gamelin, Jacques-Louis David
- Known for: Painting, engraving, lithography
- Movement: Romanticism

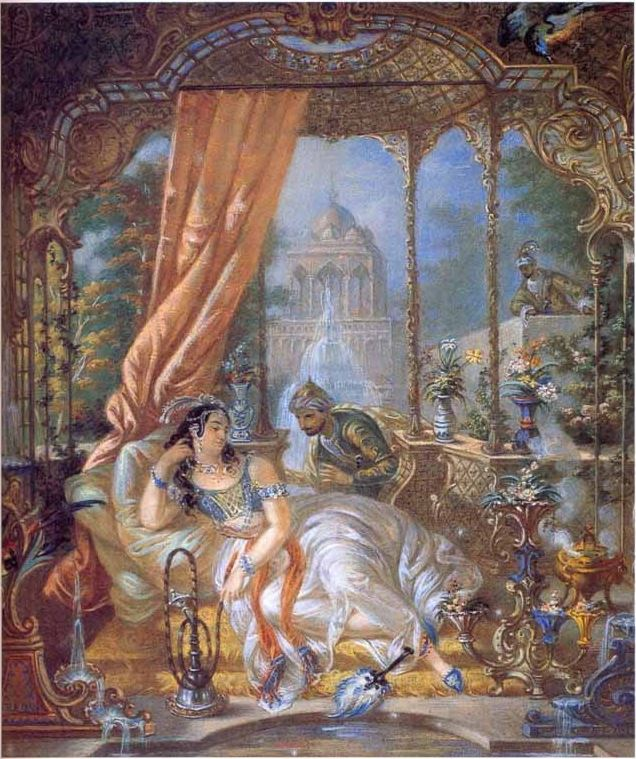
The Delights of the Harem

Mathieu Barathier (23 March 1784, in Narbonne – 6 January 1867, in Narbonne) was a French painter, engraver and lithographer.

== Biography ==
He began his studies in his native city, with Jacques Gamelin, then went to Paris to complete them with Jacques-Louis David. Ultimately, he would renounce David's Neoclassical style in favor of Romanticism; with a marked predilection for English art. He made numerous visits there and possessed a large collection of English engravings, which are now kept at the Musée d'art et d'histoire de Narbonne. He was also an admirer of Lord Byron and created sketches for his epic poem, Don Juan.

After several decades in Paris, he moved to Carcassonne in the 1850s, then returned to Narbonne, where he became a member of the "Commission Archéologique et Littéraire". In addition to engravings, he collected books, paintings, ceramics, drawings and other cultural artifacts; including ancient weapons. He also had an interest in the theater and ballet; for which he created extensive illustrations.

Among his paintings, two of the most familiar are the Orientalist works, Bayadère dansant devant un prince oriental (Temple Dancer, Dancing Before an Oriental Prince) and Les Délices du harem (The Delights of the Harem). In addition to his original work, he created colored engravings after the works of Fragonard and Monvoisin.
