= Henri Mauperché =

French painter (1602–1686)

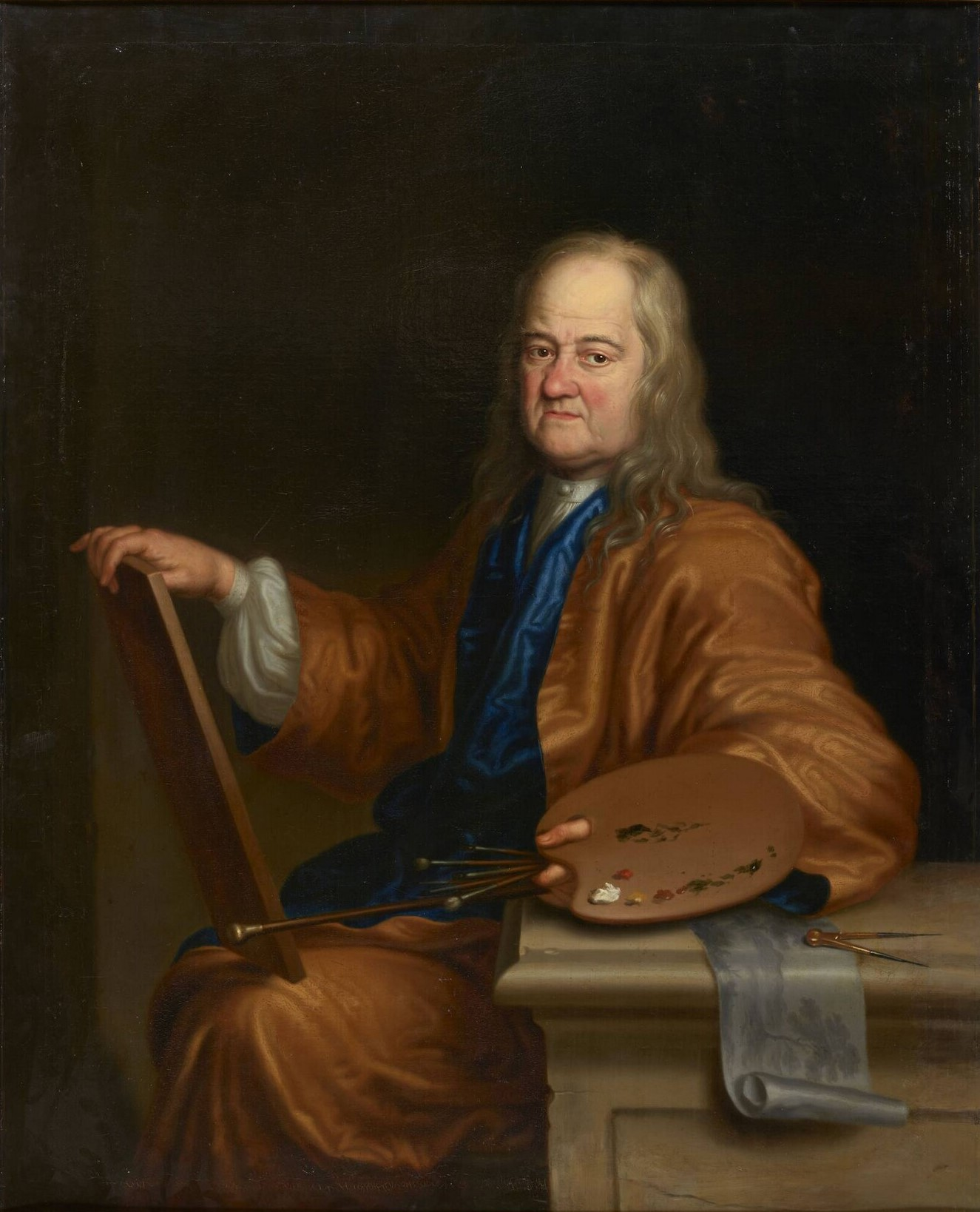
Portrait by Philippe Vignon, 1687

Henri Mauperché (c.1602 – 26 December 1686) was a French landscape painter and engraver. His name is also given as Henri Maupercher and Henri Montpercher. Most of his landscapes are capriccios.

== Biography ==
Mauperché was born in Paris. He was a student of Daniel Rabel. In 1634, he went to Rome with Louis Boullogne, where he associated with Sébastien Bourdon and a group of painters known as the Bambochade. Mauperché returned to Paris in 1639, where he was commissioned to paint decorations in the guard room and antechamber of the Palais-Cardinal; the residence of Cardinal Richelieu.

In 1645, Mauperché married Magdeleine Garnot. From 1646 to 1647, he worked on decorating the "Cabinet de l'Amour" at the Hôtel Lambert, along with the landscape painters Pierre Patel, Jan Asselyn and Herman van Swanevelt.

In 1648, Mauperché became a member of the Académie royale de peinture et de sculpture and was named a Professor in 1655, which was an unusual honor for a landscape painter. Together with Laurent de La Hyre, he helped to popularize the classical landscape style of Claude Lorrain. Having become famous for his decorations, Mauperché undertook to paint the apartments of Queen Anne of Austria at Fontainebleau. As with the Hôtel Lambert, the greater part of those works have disappeared.

His wife died in 1671. By 1686, Mauperché was too ill to attend sessions of the Académie, and was excused. He died in Paris at the end of that year.

== Selected works ==
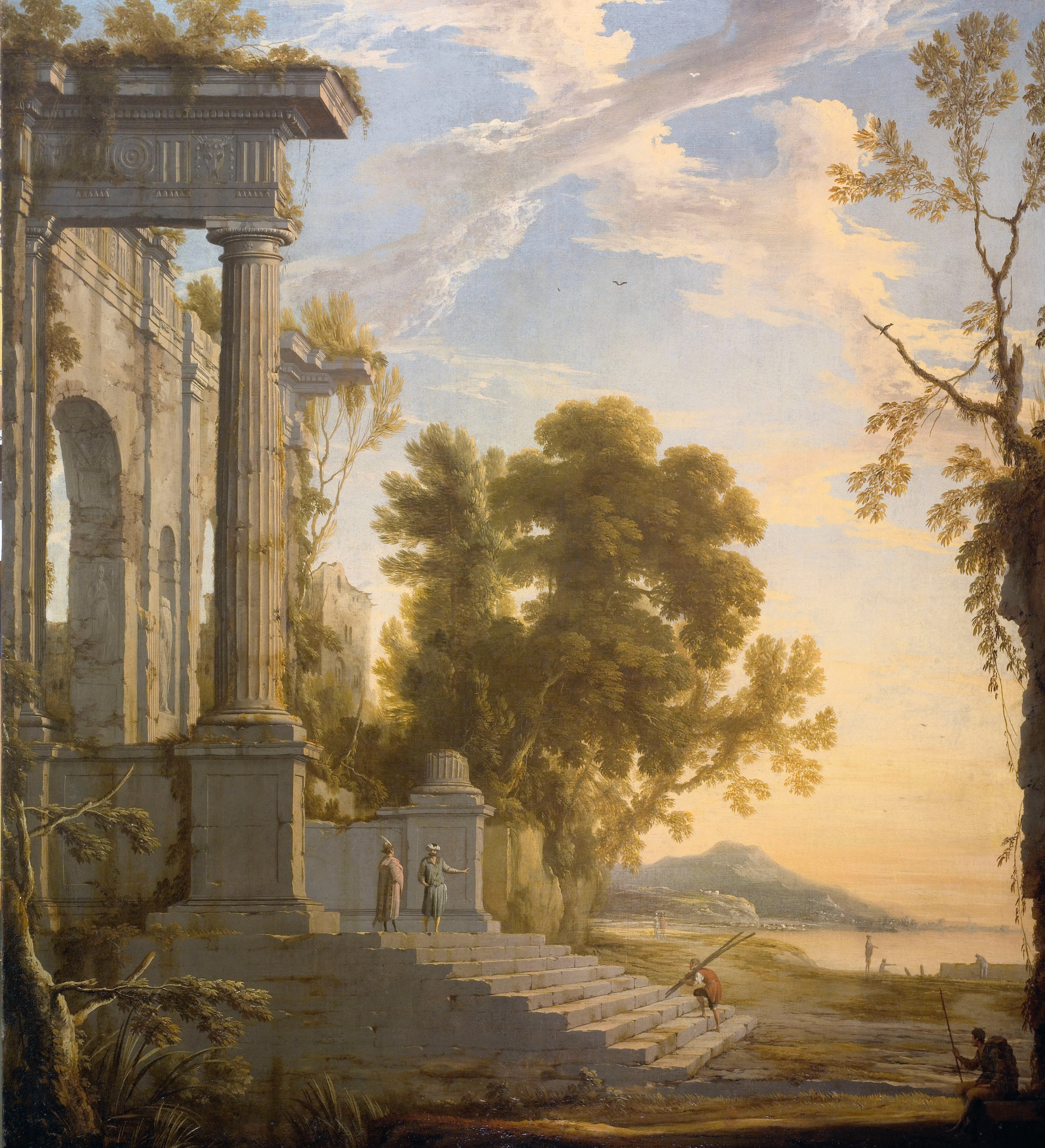
Landscape with figures, c. 1645

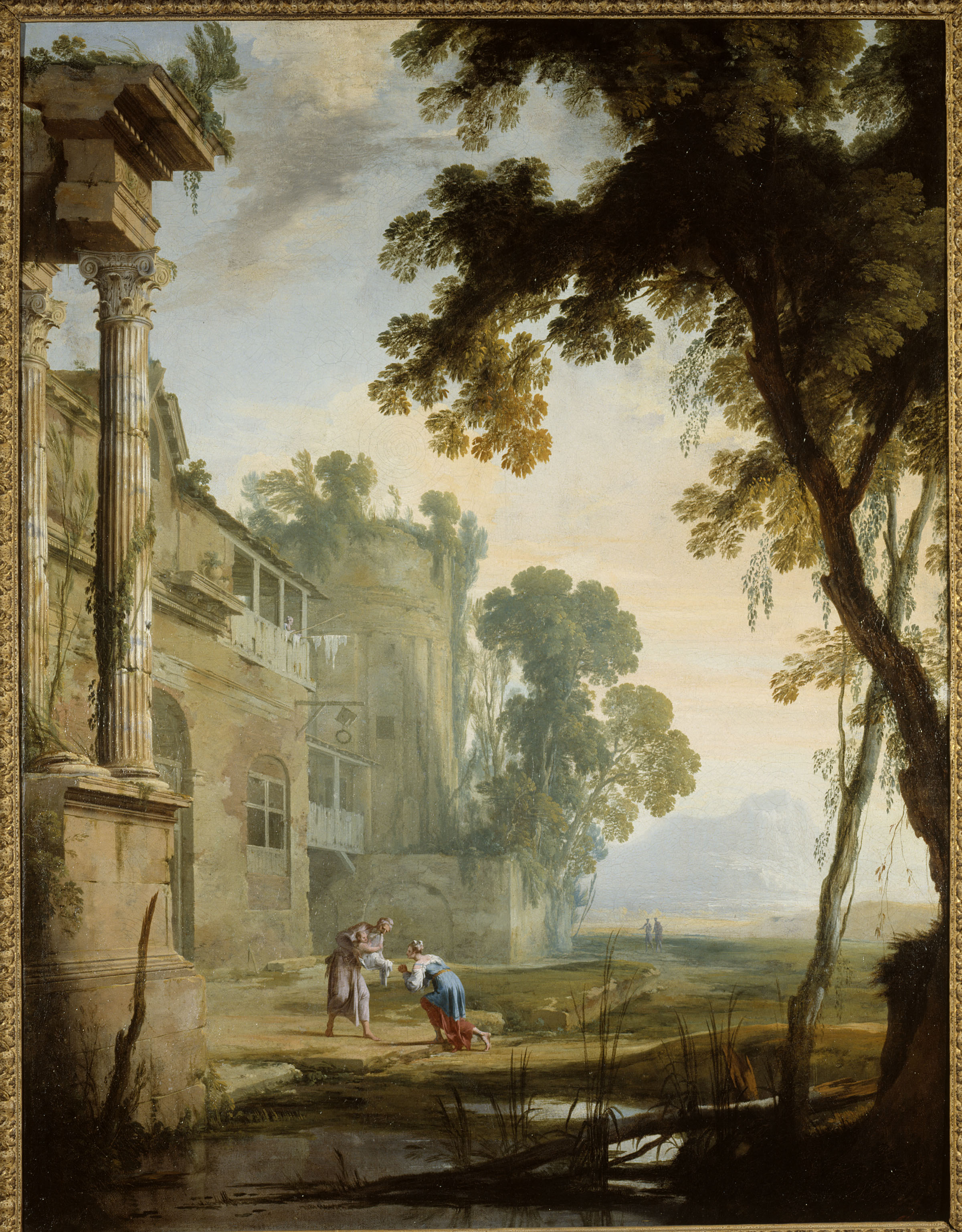
Landscape, c. 1650

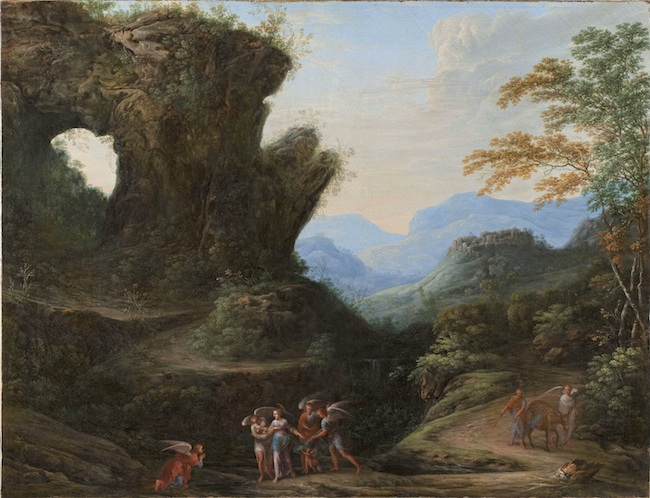
Landscape with the Flight into Egypt, 1665

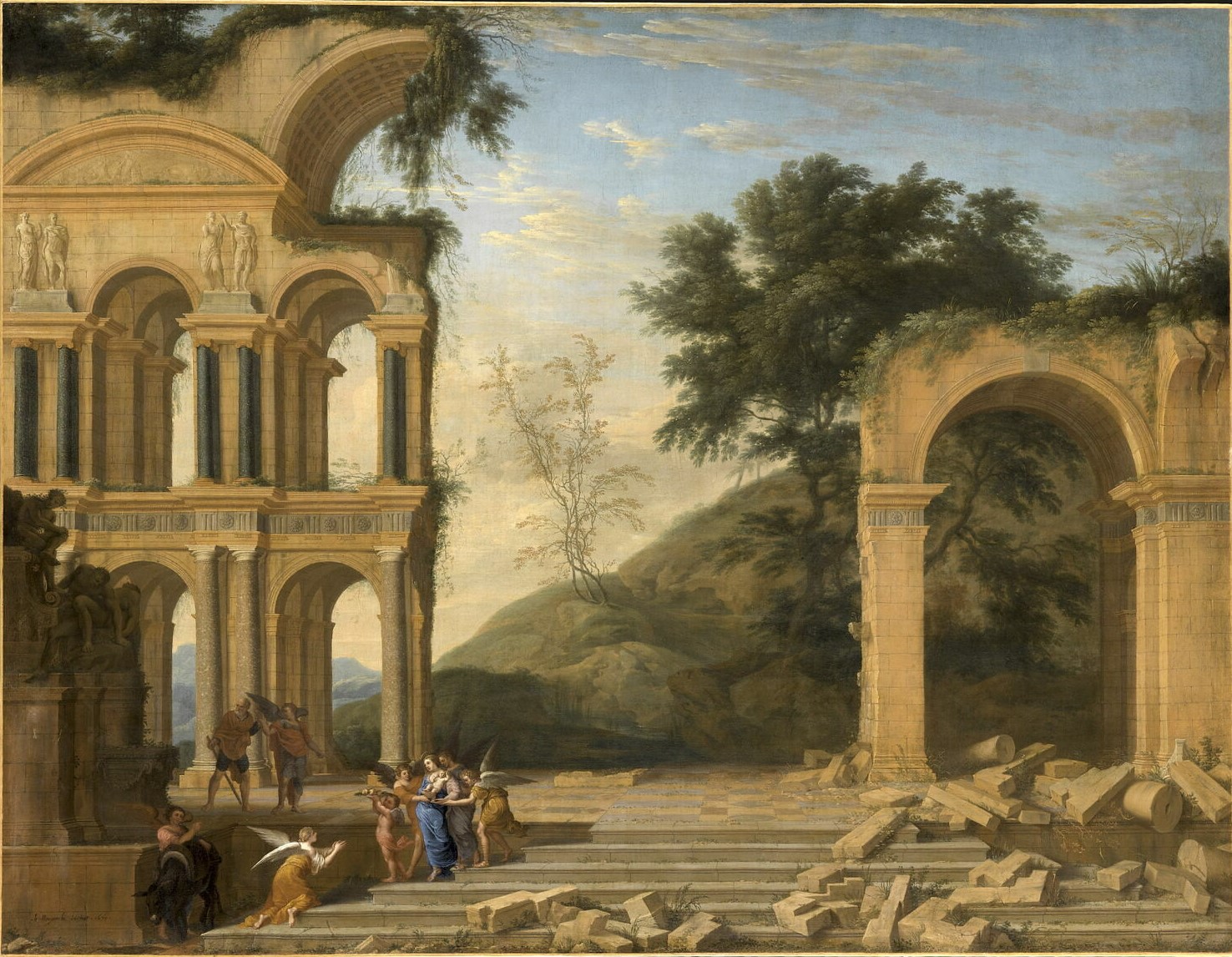
Landscape with the Rest on the Flight into Egypt, 1671

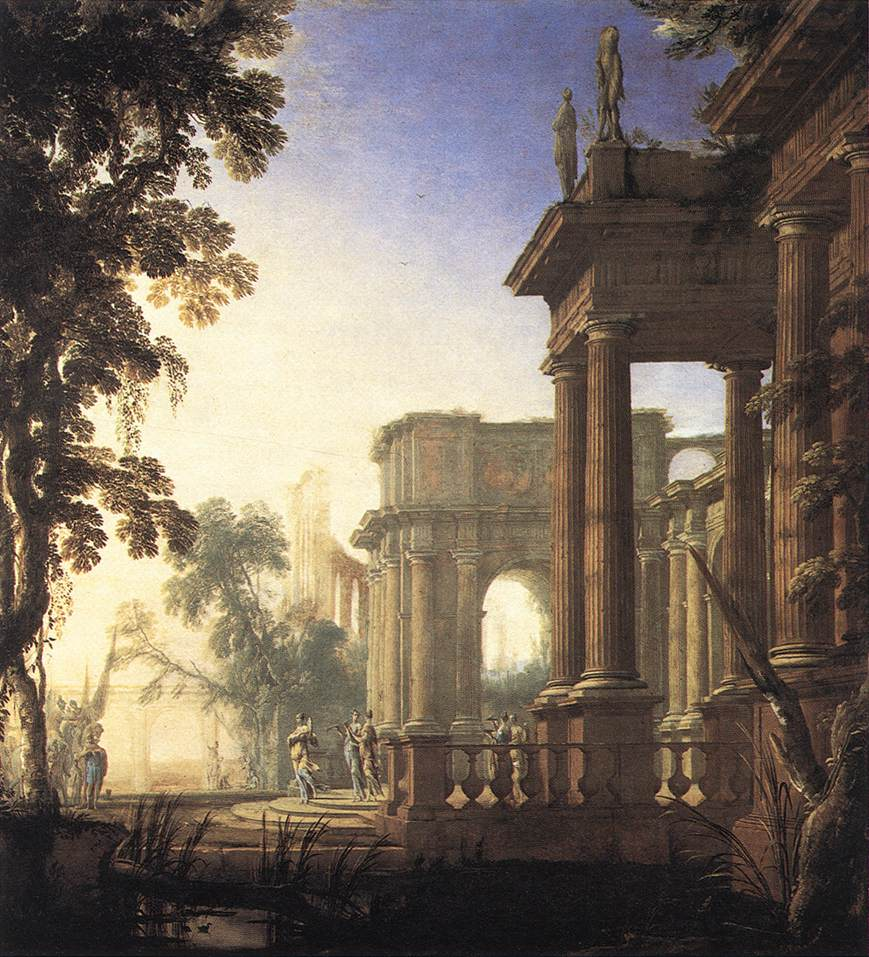
Landscape with Jephthah and his daughter

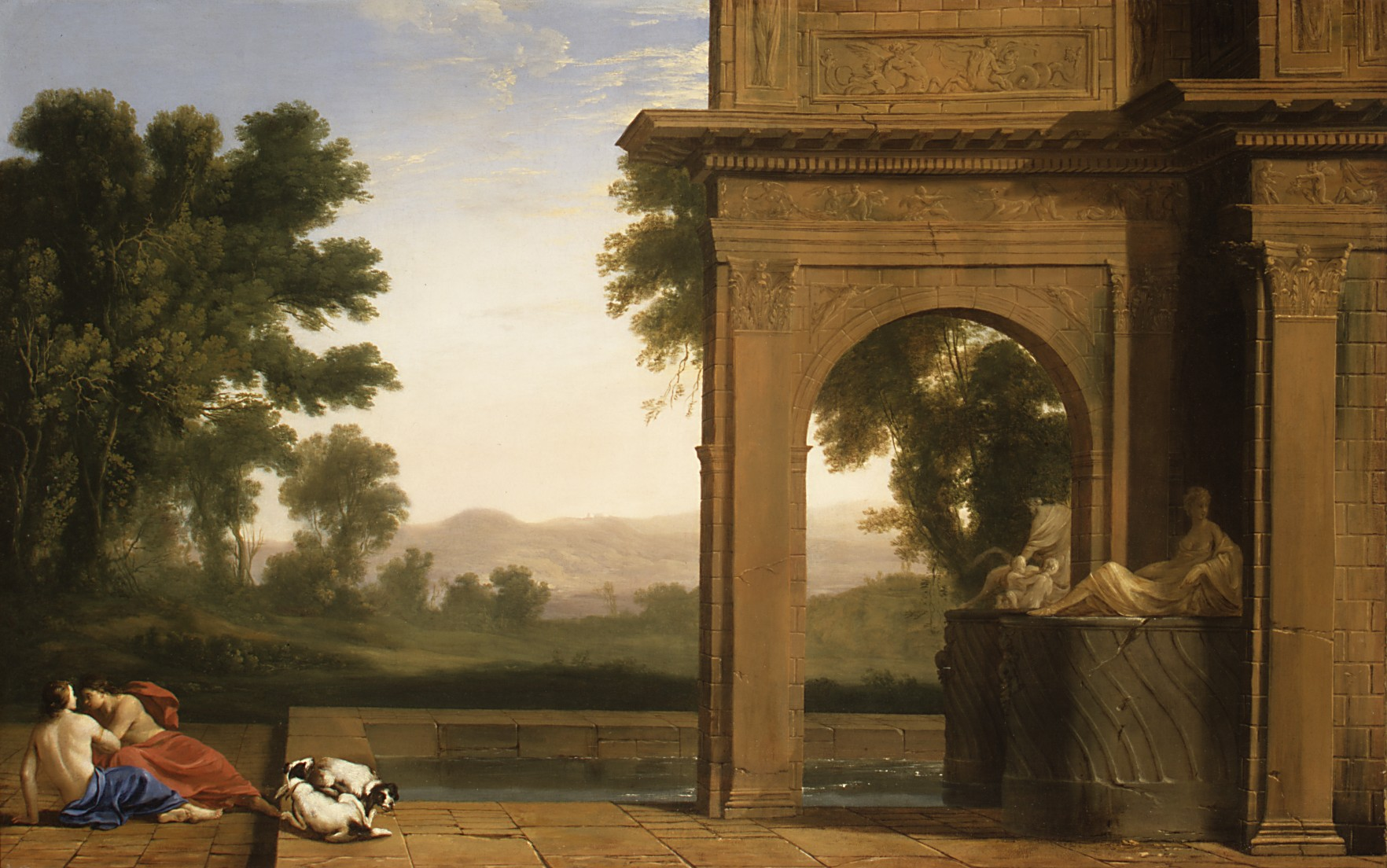
Classical landscape with figures

== Sources ==
- Bernard Biard; "Henri Mauperché, paysagiste au long cours", in, L’Objet d’Art, #316, September 1997, pgs.31-41
