= Jean Senelle =

French painter

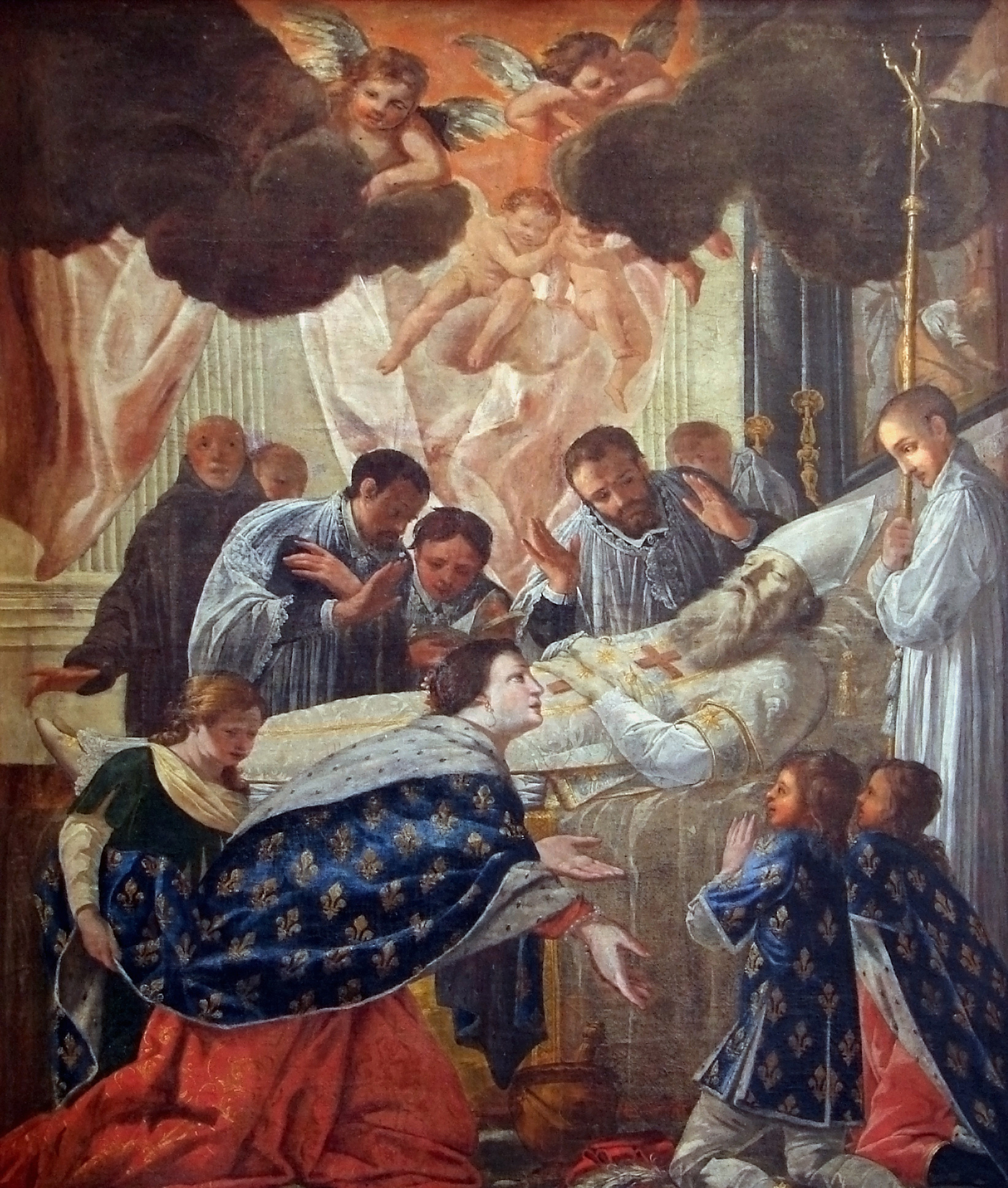
Jean Senelle, Saint Balthild at the Deathbed of Saint Eligius, cathédrale de Meaux

Jean Senelle (1605–1671) was a French painter. He studied in the studios of Georges Lallemand and Simon Vouet. His style is similar to that of Laurent de La Hyre and Claude Vignon, showing the evolution of late Mannerism into baroque classicism. Most of his works are now in the musée Bossuet in Meaux, where he died.

== Bibliography ==
- (in French) Catalogue de l'exposition de Meaux, Musée Bossuet, 1998.
