= Parisian Atticism =

French painting movement, 1640–1660

In the history of art, Parisian Atticism is a movement in French painting from 1640 to 1660, when painters working in Paris elaborated a rigorous neo-classical style, seeking sobriety, luminosity and harmony, and referring to the Greco-Roman world. Leading exponents of the style were Eustache Le Sueur, Laurent de La Hyre, and Jacques Stella; other practitioners include Sébastien Bourdon.
