= Jean Tassel =

French painter

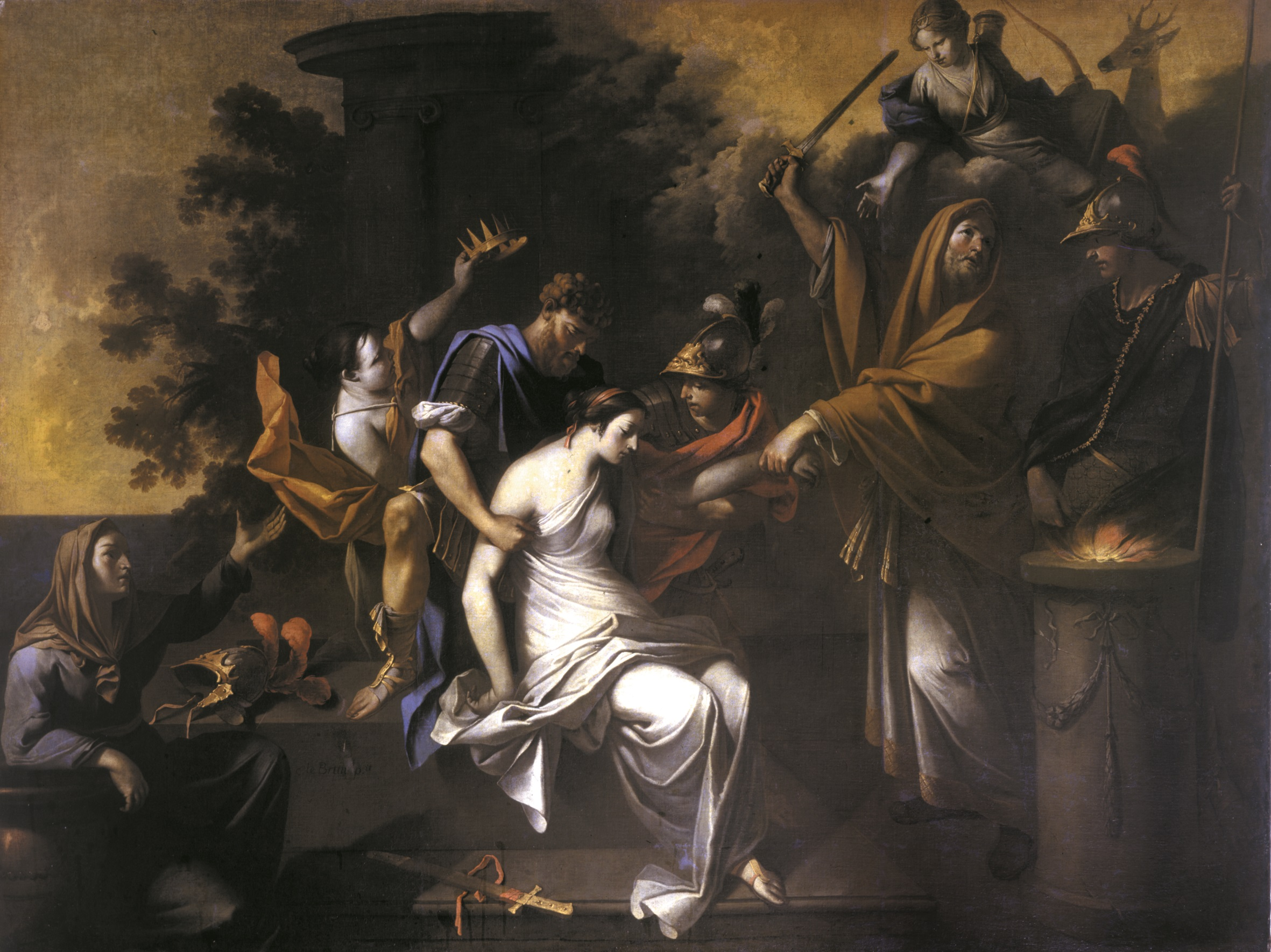
The Sacrifice of Iphigenia

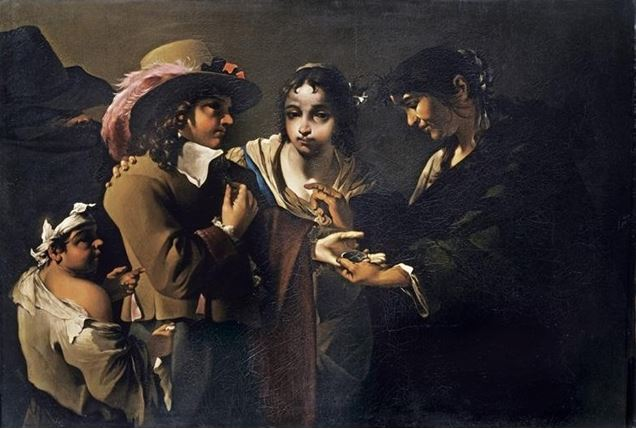
The Fortuneteller

Jean Tassel (20 March 1608, in Langres – 6 April 1667, in Langres) was a French painter who specialized in mythological and genre scenes. He also did some portraits.

== Biography ==
He was born to a family of painters. In addition to his father Richard (who was also an architect), his grandfather Pierre, granduncle Adrien and cousin Daniel of Chaumont were all painters. His mother, Marguerite (née Louys), was the daughter of a goldsmith.

He most likely received most of his training in the family workshop. Later, he travelled to Rome where, in 1634, he is listed in the register of the Basilica of Santa Maria del Popolo. It is also known that he made a copy of "The Transfiguration" by Raphael. It is unknown which living Italian painters he may have been in contact with although, judging from his use of lighting effects, he was probably influenced by the recently deceased Caravaggio.

Documents from 1636 indicate that he was in Avignon. He was back in Langres in 1647, when he married Simone Contet. He spent the remained of his life there and held some municipal offices.

Despite his rural location, he kept track of artistic developments in Paris and shows some influence from the works of Simon Vouet and Laurent de La Hyre. A traditional story has it that Charles Le Brun invited him to Paris to assist in creating decorations commissioned by King Louis XIV, but Tassel declined, preferring to stay in Langres.

Like his father, his workshop took orders from the entire province. Customers in Dijon were especially numerous, as evidenced by the number of his paintings seized from religious communities there during the Revolution. Of particular note are a series of works made for the Ursuline convent, under the direction of Catherine de Montholon (1568-1650). Most of these are now in the Musée des beaux-arts de Dijon.
