= Jacques Gamelin =

French painter

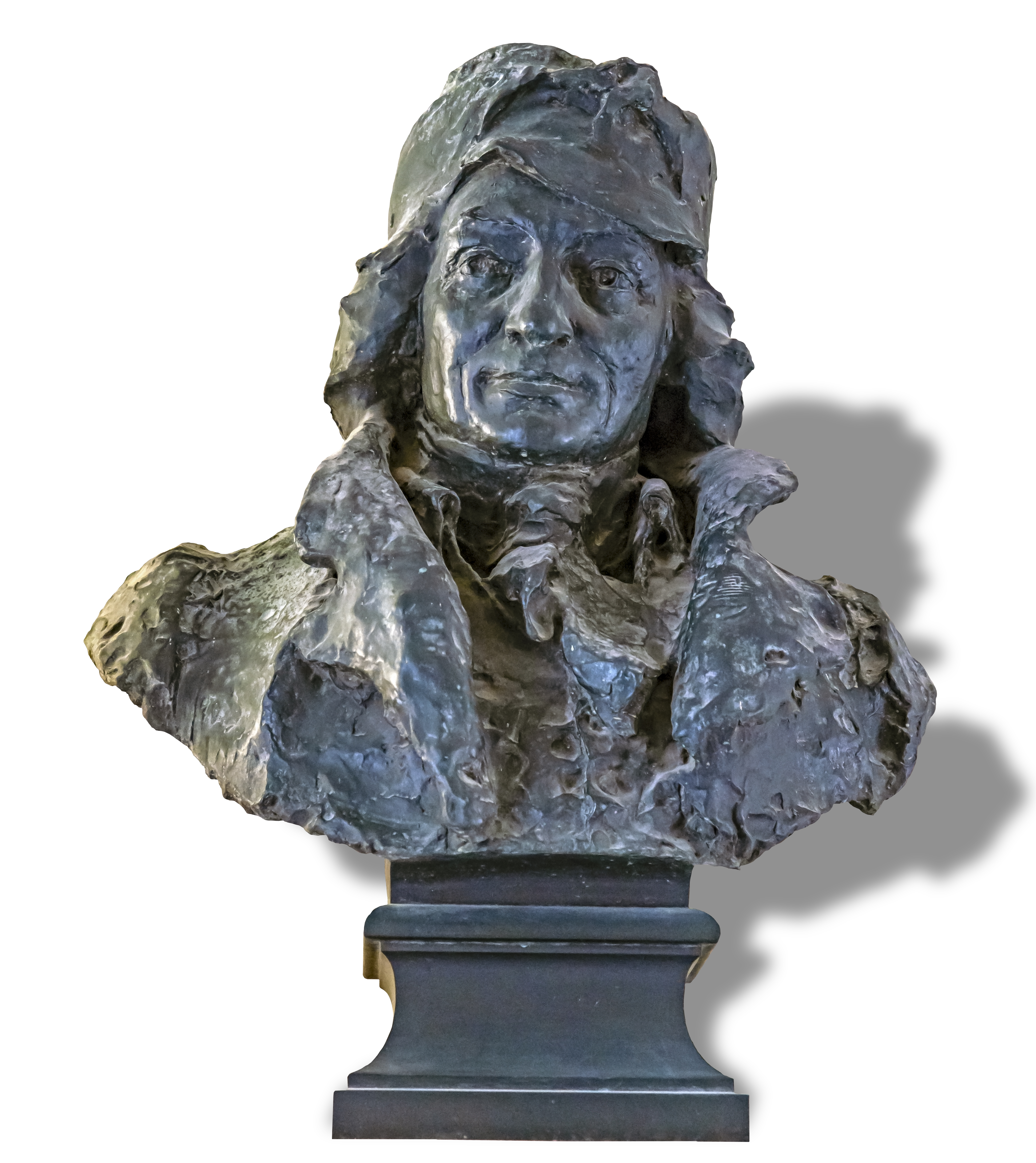
Jacques Gamelin sculpted by Alexandre Falguiere

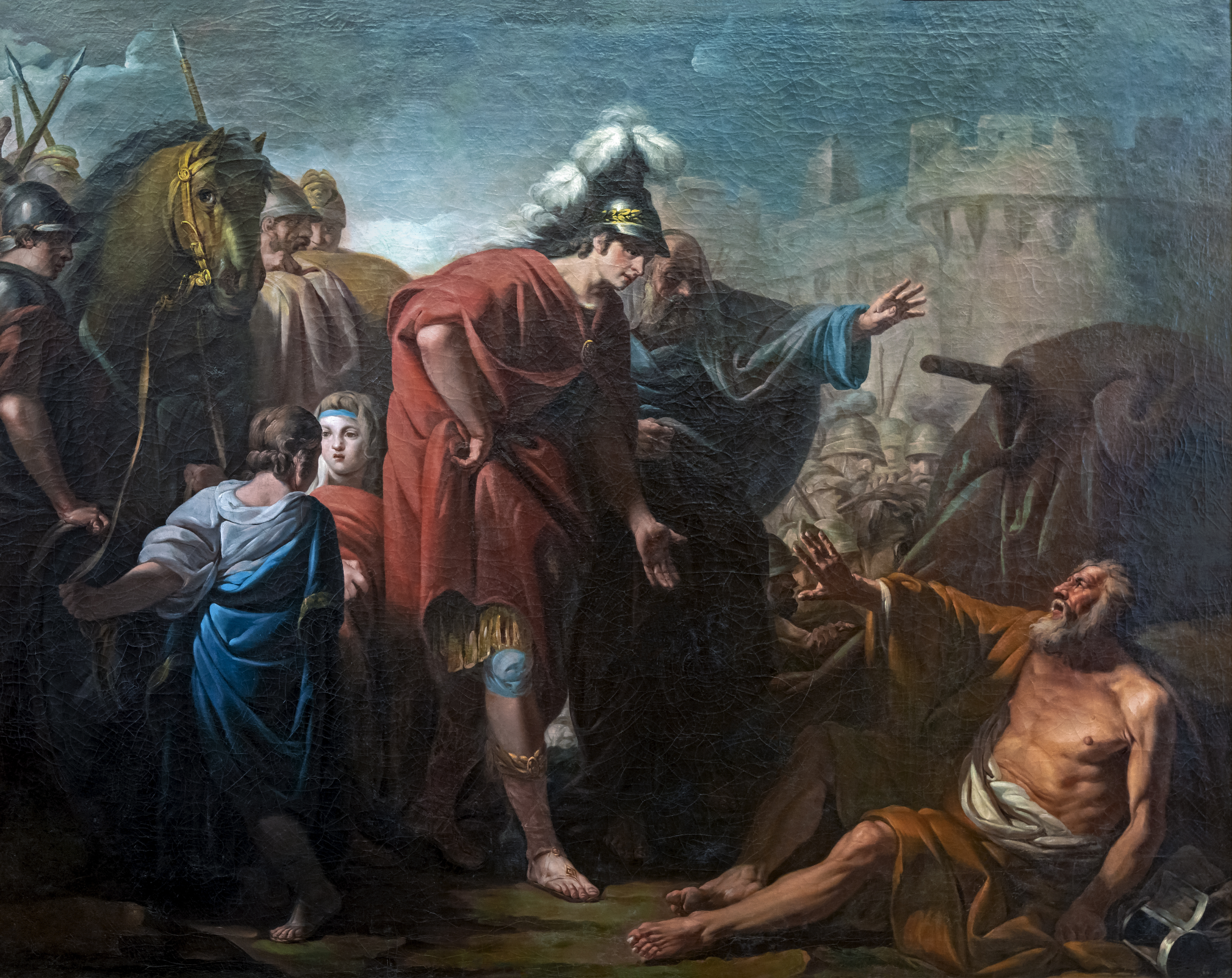
Alexandre et Diogène, the artist is depicting the scene where Alexander asks Diogenes, "Is there anything I can do for you?" and Diogenes answers, "Yes, stand out of my sun."

Jacques Gamelin (October 3, 1738 – October 12, 1803) was an artist born in Carcassonne, France, the son of a successful merchant. After receiving an education from the Jesuits, he went into the service of Nicolas Joseph de Marcassus, baron de Puymaurin (1718–1791), a wealthy industrialist of Toulouse, to learn the ways of business. Puymaurin quickly saw that his young assistant had little talent or interest in business but showed great promise as an artist. Gamelin's father rejected Puymaurin's suggestion that Jacques be sent to an art academy, so the baron paid his way at the Académie royale de Toulouse himself. After five years study, Jacques Gamelin won the Académie's first prize and he went to Paris to continue his studies. Gamelin later went to Rome with Puymaurin's financial assistance to study under Jacques-Louis David and Joseph-Marie Vien and eventually became a painter to Pope Clement XIV. On the death of his father, which left Jacques a wealthy man, he returned to Toulouse where he taught at the Académie. He is most known today for his paintings and engravings of battle scenes, which can be found in art museums throughout France. Jacques Gamelin died in Carcassonne on October 12, 1803.

When Jacques Gamelin returned to France after his father's death, he undertook his great work, Nouveau recueil d'ostéologie et de myologie, most likely funding its publication using some of his great inheritance. The work is known for its display of both talent and imagination, with striking scenes of the Resurrection, the Crucifixion, and skeletons at play. Aside from the full-page copperplate illustrations by Gamelin and the engraver Lavalée, the work contains a number of intriguing vignettes on the title pages and elsewhere, which show battle scenes, visitations by death on unsuspecting revelers, and the anatomical artist's studio.
