= Sébastien Bourdon =

French painter (1616–1671)

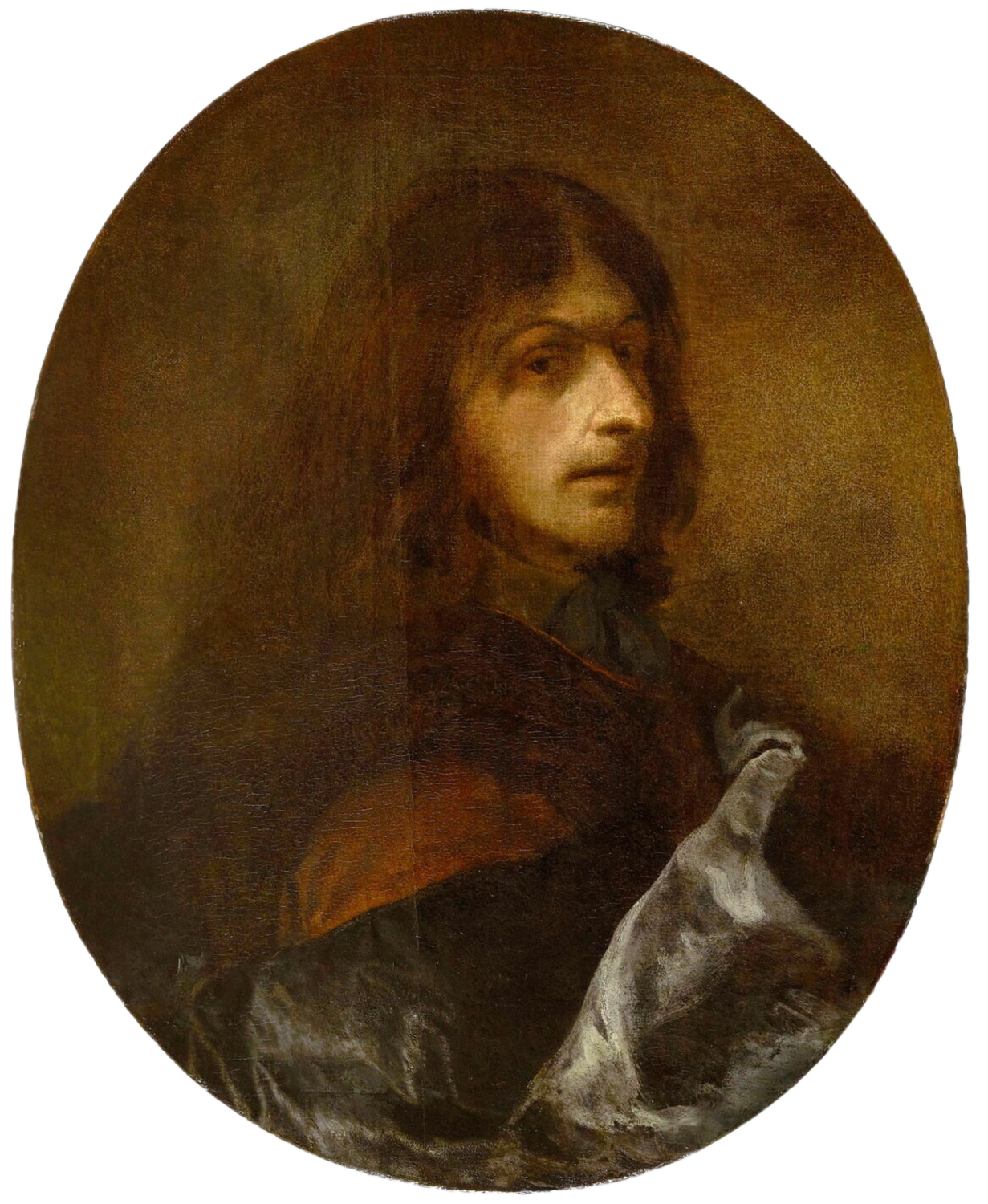
Self-portrait, 1652–1658

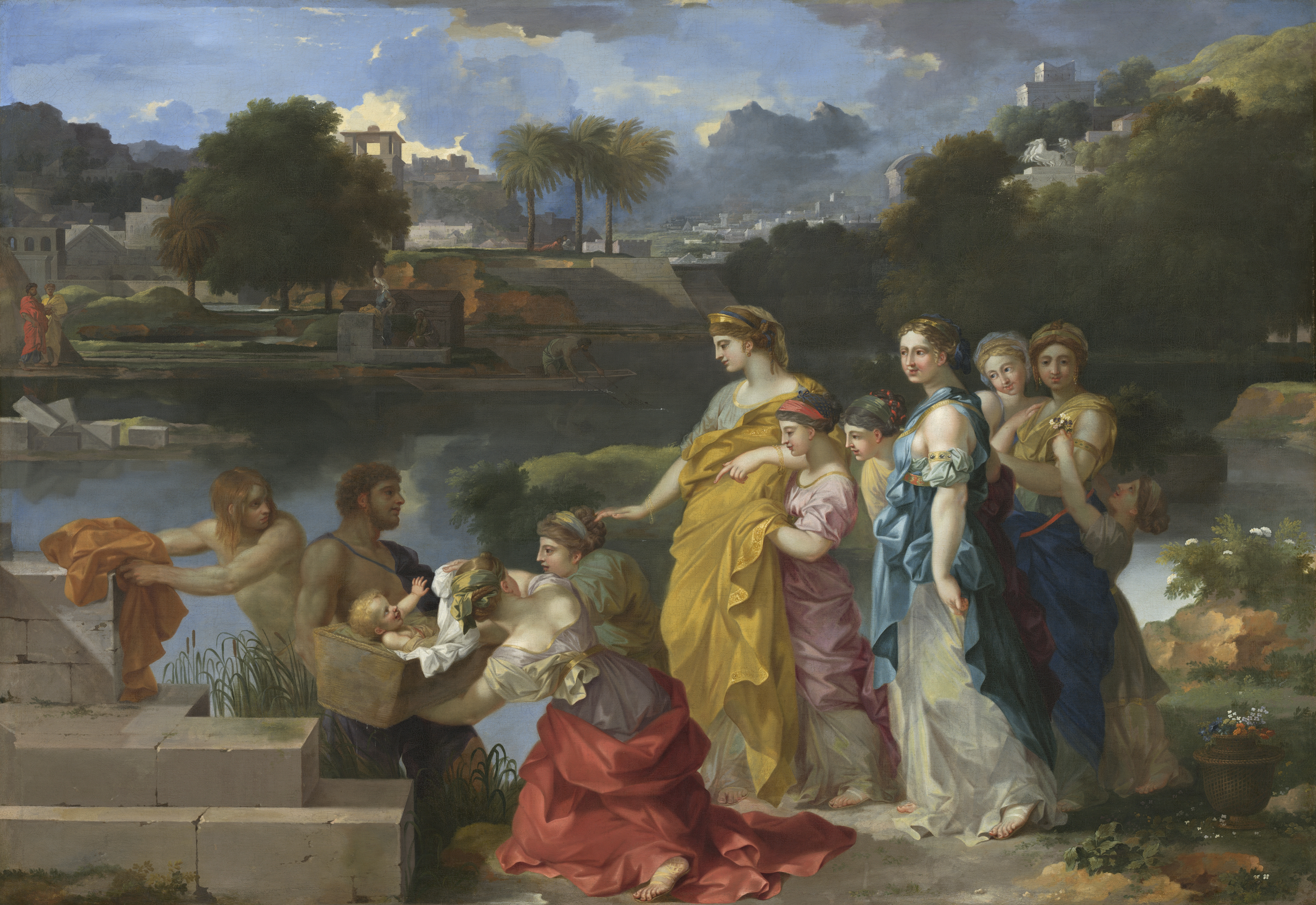
The Finding of Moses, c. 1650 (National Gallery of Art, Washington)

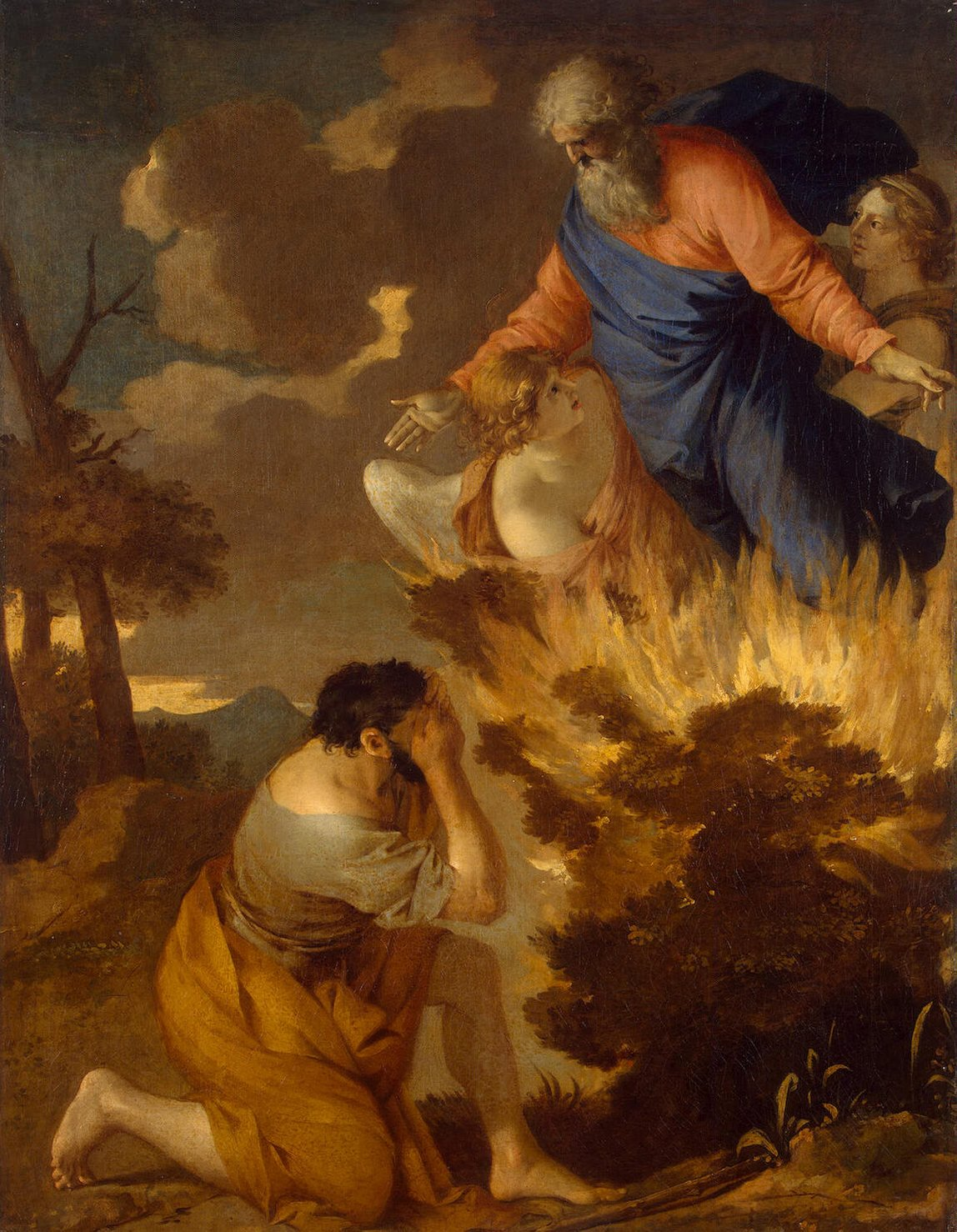
Burning bush, by Bourdon, portrays Moses and the burning bush, Hermitage Museum

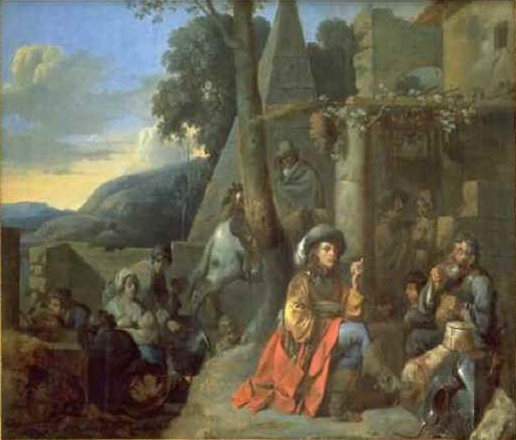
Le Camp de Bohémiens, oil on wood, Musée Fabre

Sébastien Bourdon (French pronunciation: [sebastjɛ̃ buʁdɔ̃]; 2 February 1616 – 8 May 1671) was a French painter and engraver. His chef d'œuvre is The Crucifixion of St. Peter made for the cathedral of Notre Dame.

== Biography ==
Bourdon was born in Montpellier, France, the son of a Protestant glass painter. He was apprenticed to a painter in Paris. In spite of his poverty he managed to get to Rome in 1636. There he studied the paintings of masters such as Nicolas Poussin, Claude Lorrain and Caravaggio. He was forced to flee Rome in 1638, fearing prosecution for his Reformed Protestant faith.

He lived in Paris from 1637 to 1652. In 1648, Bourdon was one of the founders of the French Royal Academy of Painting and Sculpture and was elected as one of the original twelve elders in charge of its running.

In 1652 he departed for Sweden, where Queen Christina of Sweden made him her first court painter.

Bourdon's facility rendered him adept at portraiture, whether in a dashing Rubens manner or in intimate, sympathetic bust-length or half-length portraits isolated against plain backgrounds that set a formula for middle-class portraiture for the rest of the century, landscapes in the manner of Gaspar Dughet or capricci of ruins, mythological "history painting" like other members of Poussin's circle or the genre subjects of the Dutch Bamboccianti who were working in Rome. His eclectic range of styles have given art historians exercise in tracing his adaptation of his models, while the lack of an immediately recognizable "Bourdon style" has somewhat dampened public appreciation. Some of his work was in the neoclassical style of Parisian Atticism.

Bourdon spent most of his working career outside France, where, though he was a founding member of the Académie royale, he was for long largely dismissed as a pasticheur, a situation partly rectified by a comprehensive exhibition in 2000 of his work at the Musée Fabre, Montpellier (whose collection includes a fine Lamentation painted in the last years of his life).

His success required the establishment of an extensive atelier, where his pupils included Nicolas-Pierre Loir and Pierre Mosnier. He died in Paris in 1671.
