= Laurent de La Hyre =

French painter (1606–1656)

- Born: 27 February 1606; Paris, Kingdom of France (now France)
- Died: 28 December 1656 (aged 50); Paris
- Known for: Painting
- Movement: Classicism; Baroque

Laurent de La Hyre (French pronunciation: [loʁɑ̃ də la iʁ]; 27 February 1606 – 28 December 1656) was a French Baroque painter, born in Paris. He was a leading exponent of the neoclassical style of Parisian Atticism.

== Life ==
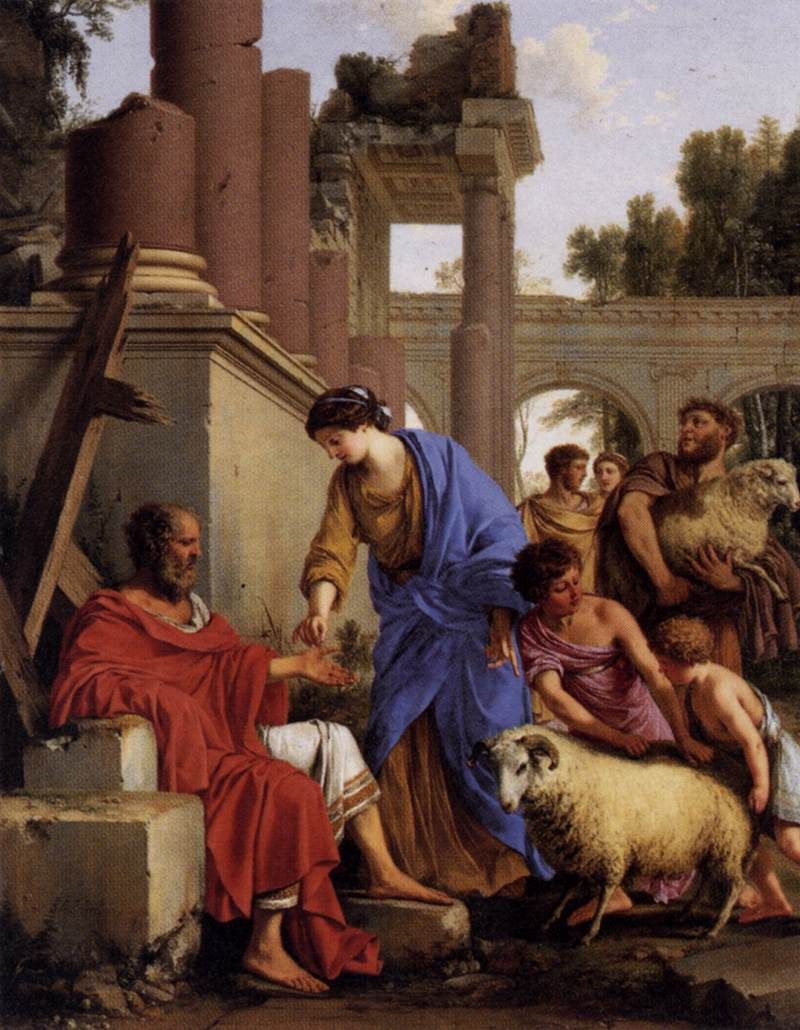
Job Restored to Prosperity

La Hyre was greatly influenced by the work of Italian artists who came to Paris. He became a pupil of Georges Lallemand and studied the works of Primaticcio at Fontainebleau, but never visited Italy. La Hyre's captivating use of color and delicately posed figures are a trademark of his early, painteresque style. He was an innovative artist who used his superior skills as a storyteller to portray rarely depicted subjects. La Hyre is associated with the transitional period before the introduction of the French Baroque by Simon Vouet.

His picture of Pope Nicholas V opening the crypt in which he discovers the corpse of St. Francis of Assisi standing (located at the Louvre) was executed in 1630 for the Capuchin friars of the Marais; its gravity and sobriety seems to have been influential for the next generation of French painters, particularly Eustache Le Sueur. The Louvre contains eight other works, and paintings by La Hyre are in the museums of Strasburg, Rouen and Le Mans.

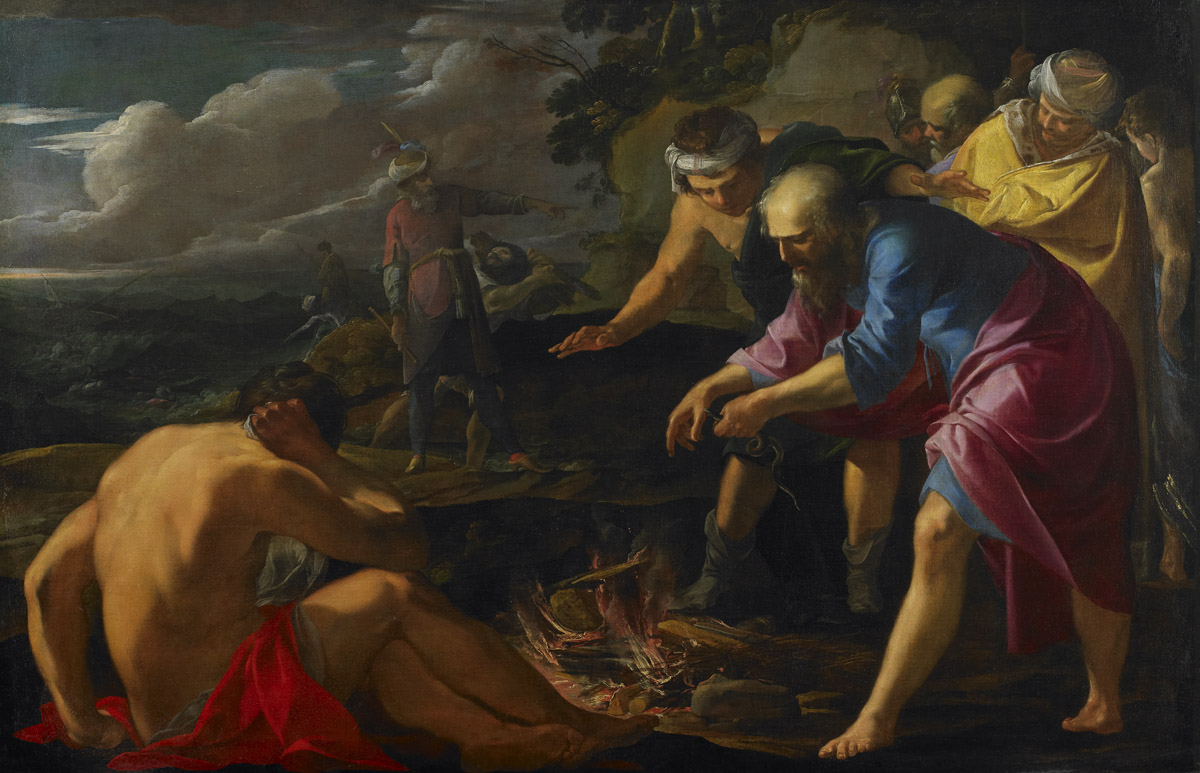
Saint Paul Shipwrecked on Malta

His drawings, of which the British Museum possesses a fine example, Presentation of the Virgin in the Temple, are treated as seriously as his paintings, and sometimes show simplicity and dignity of effect. The example of the Capuchins, for whom he executed several other works in Paris, Rouen and Fécamp, was followed by the goldsmith's company, for whom he produced in 1635 St. Peter healing the Sick (Louvre) and the Conversion of St Paul in 1637.

In 1648, La Hyre was one of the founders of the French Royal Academy of Painting and Sculpture and was elected as one of the original twelve elders in charge of its running.

Richelieu called La Hyre to the Palais Royal; Pierre Séguier, Gédéon Tallemant des Réaux and many others entrusted him with important works of decoration; for the Gobelins he designed a series of large compositions. La Hyre painted also a great number of portraits, and in 1654 united in one work for the town-hall of Paris those of the principal dignitaries of the municipality. His students included François Chauveau.

== Works by Laurent de La Hyre ==
Mythological and other themes

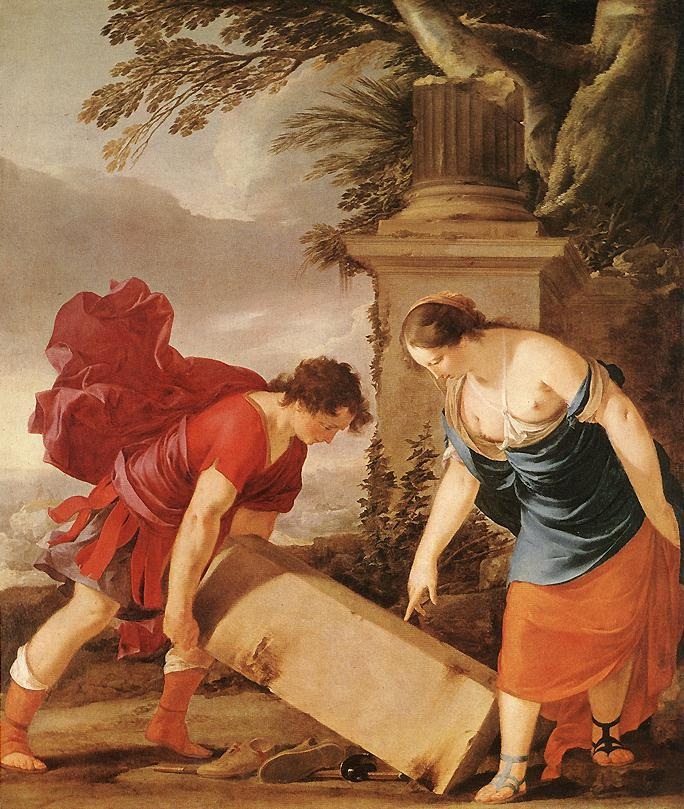
Theseus and Aethra

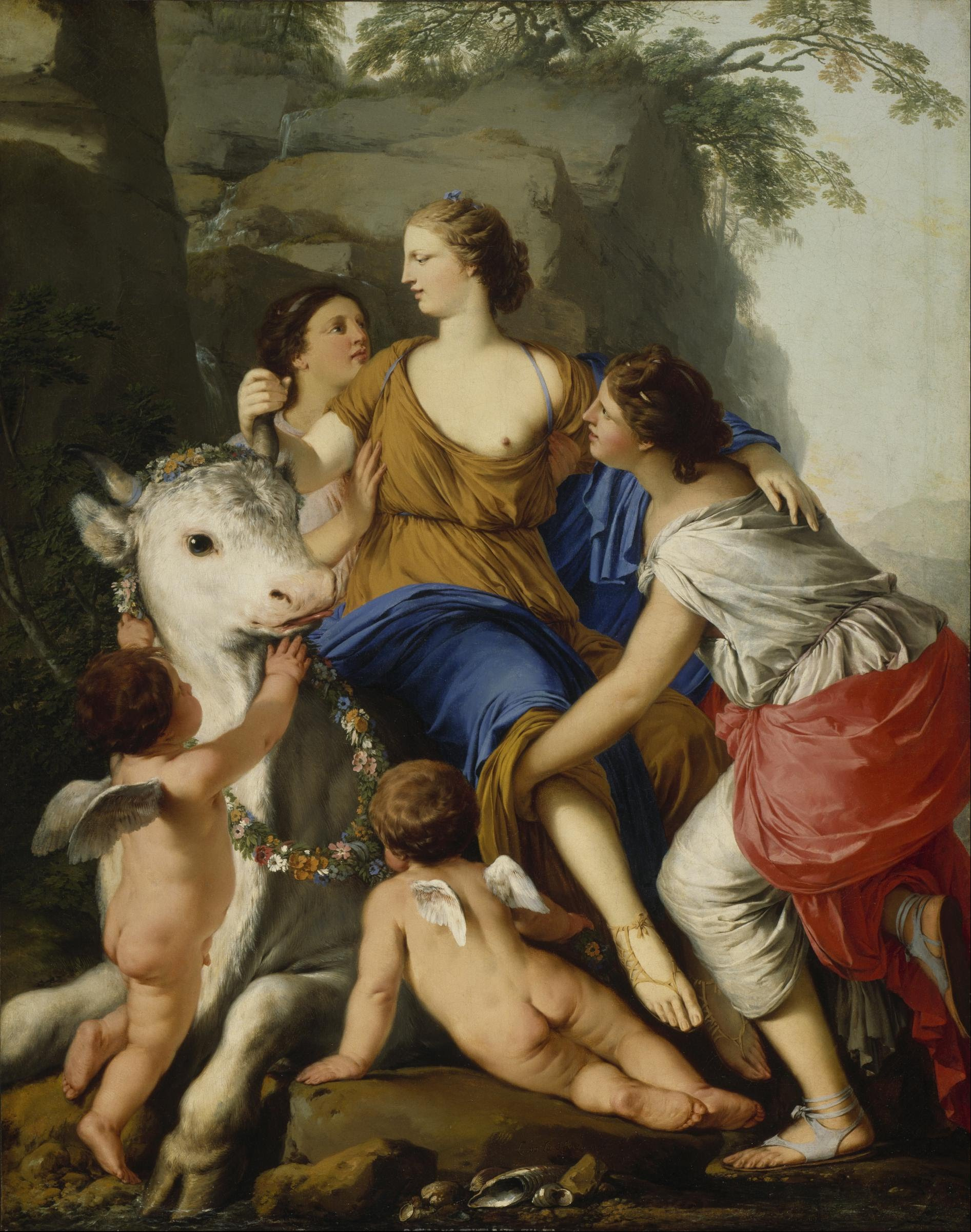
The Rape of Europa

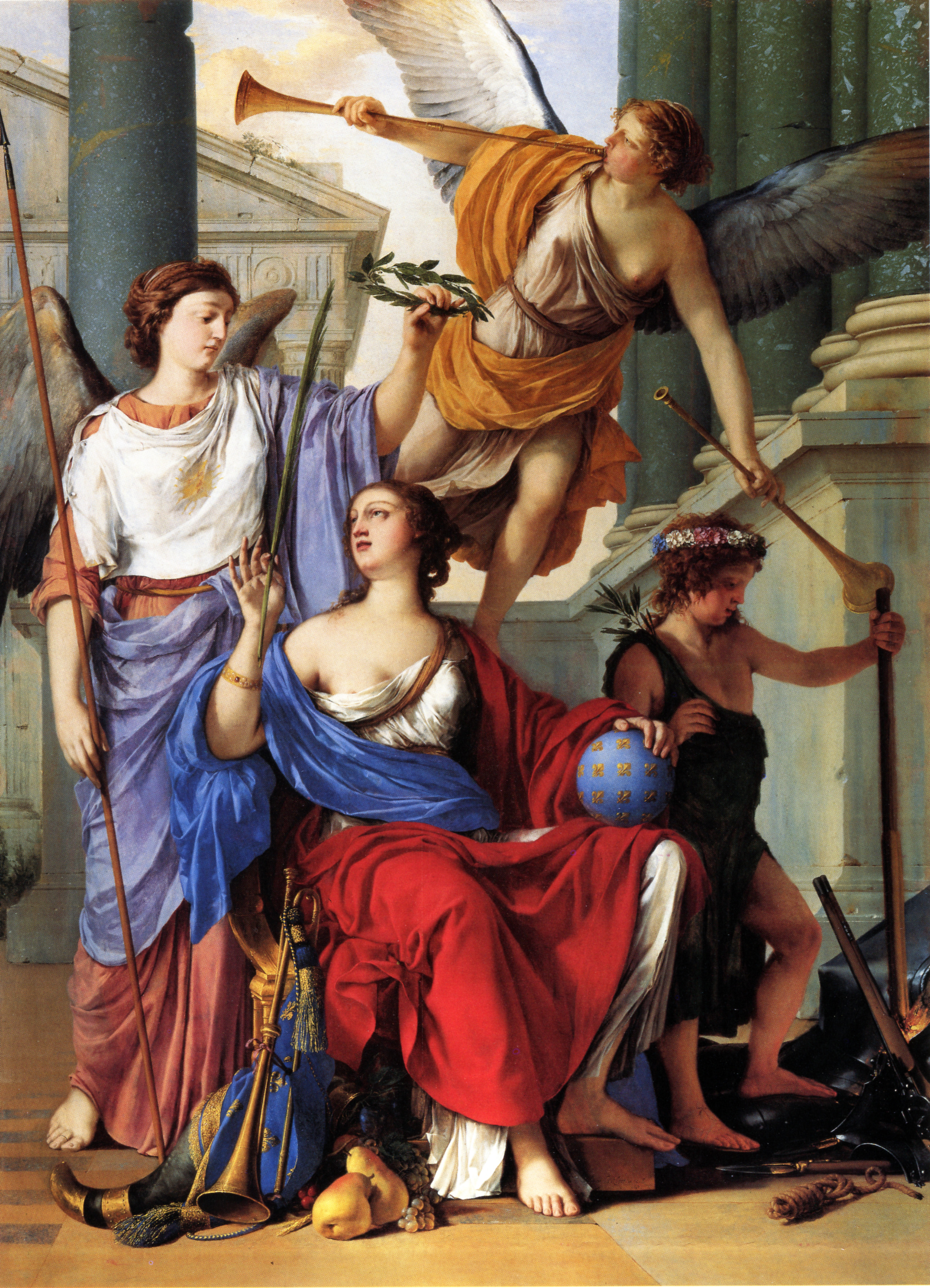
Regency of Anne of Austria

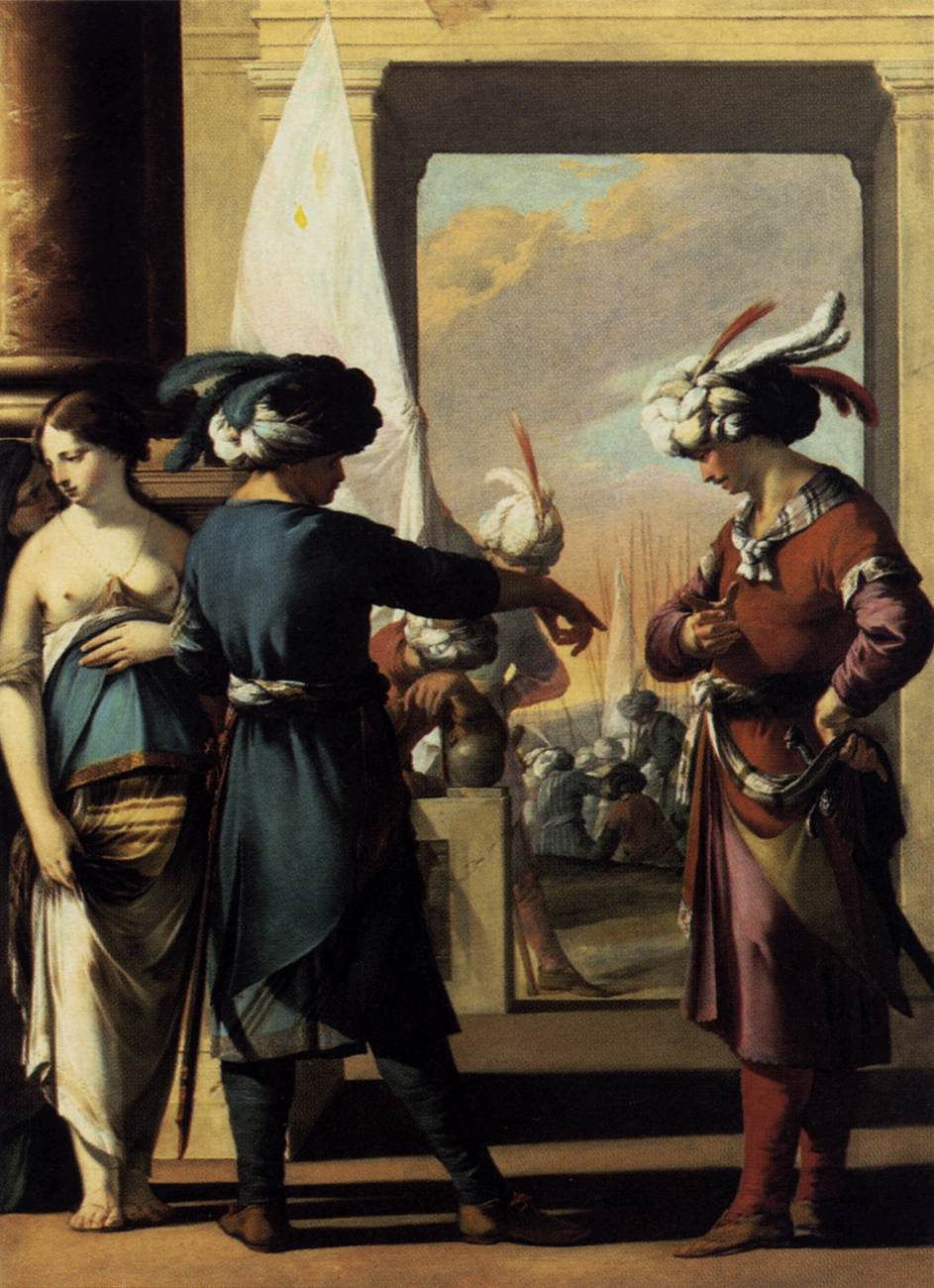
Cyrus Announcing to Araspas that Panthea Has Obtained His Pardon

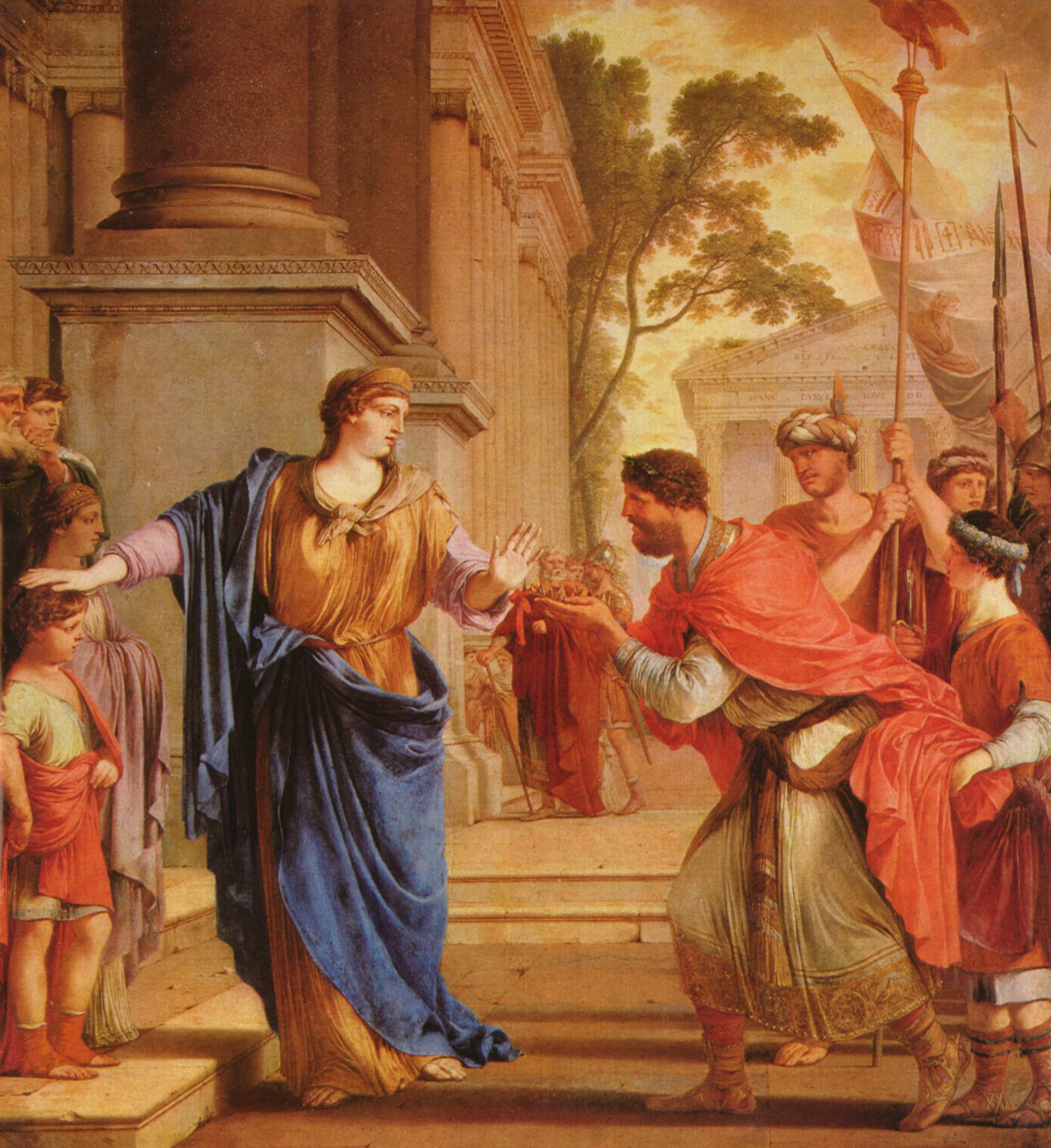
Cornelia Refuses The Crown of The Ptolomai (1646)

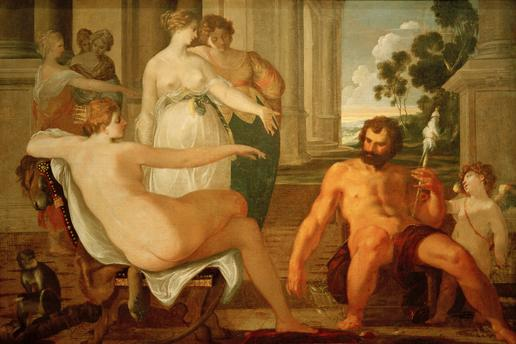
Hercules and Omphale (1626)
Seven Liberal Arts

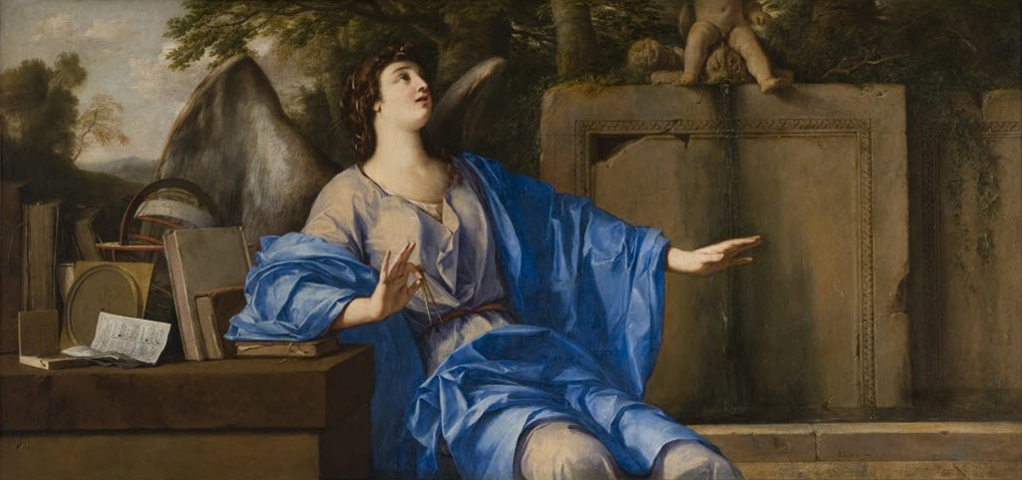
Allegory of Astronomy (1649)

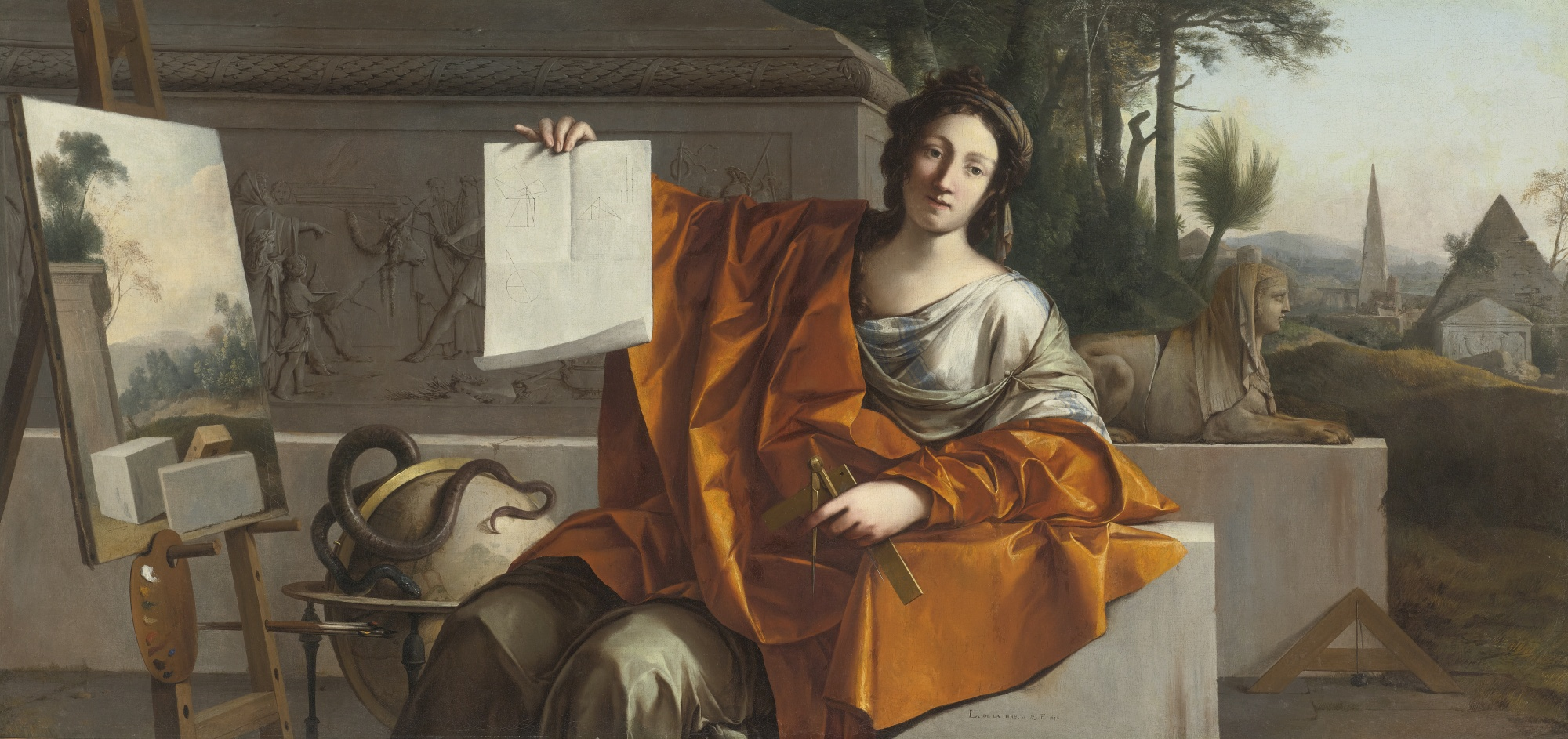
Allegory of Geometry (1649)

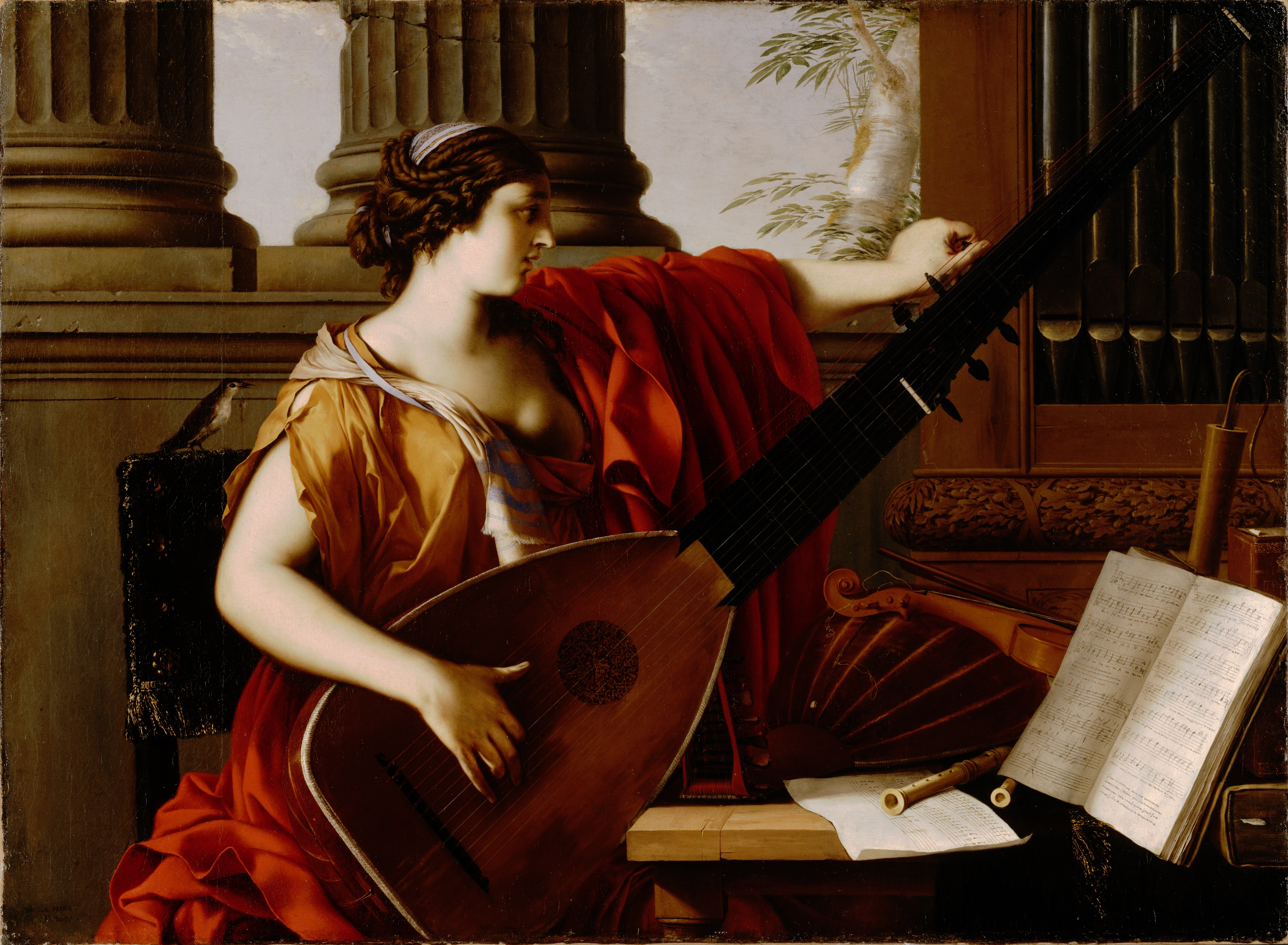
Allegory of Music (1649)

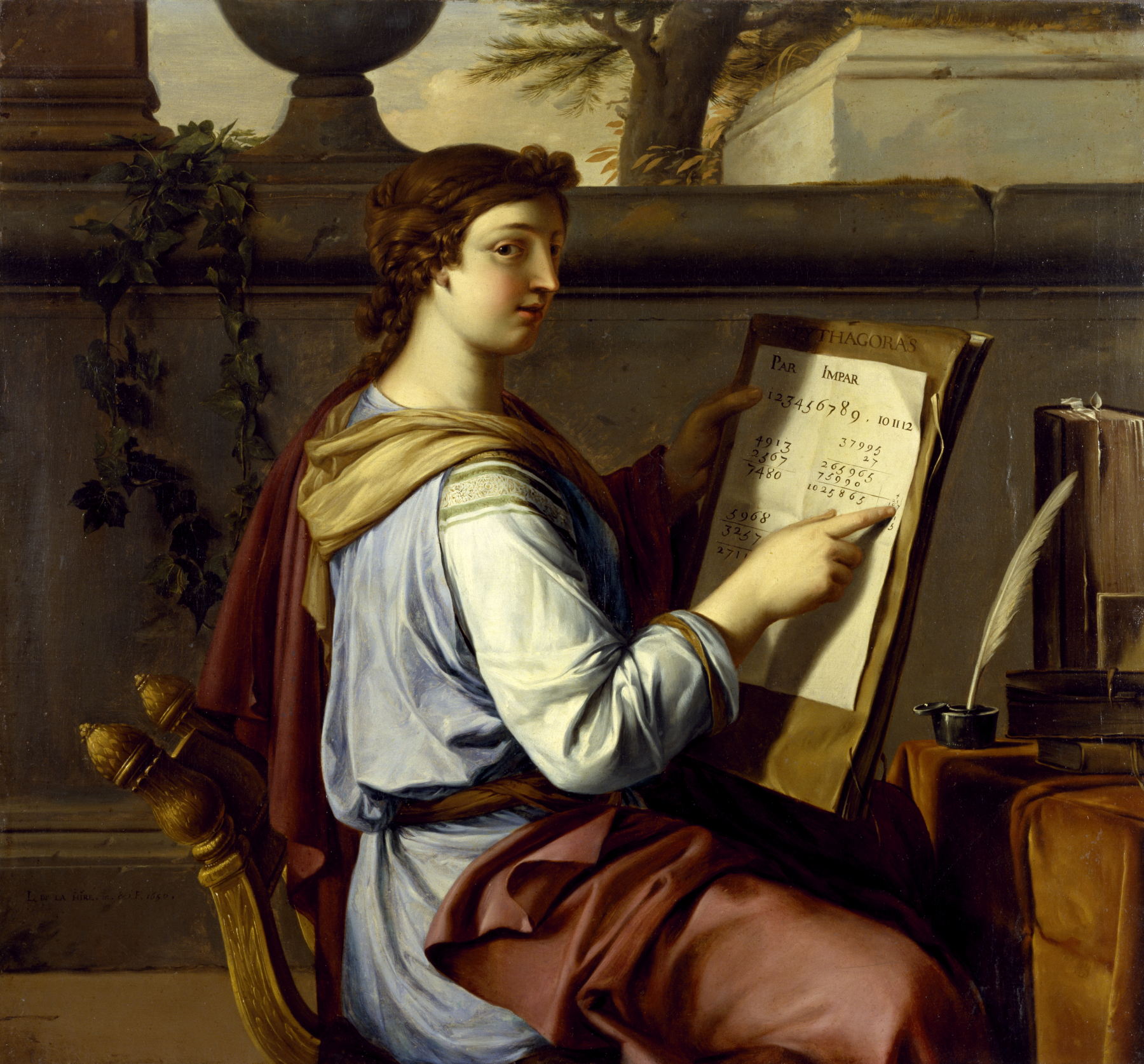
Allegory of Arithmetic (1650)

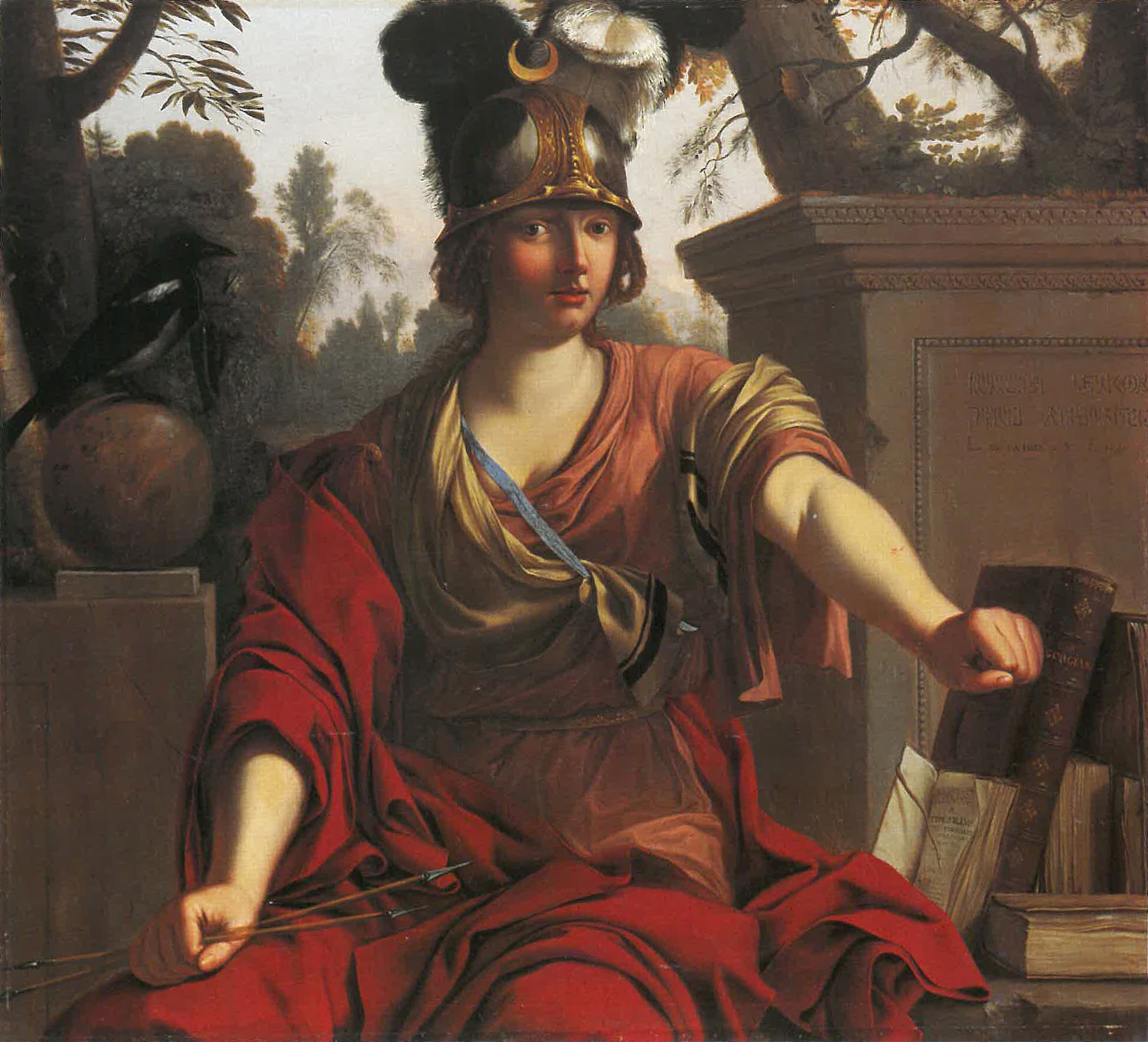
Allegory of Dialectic (1650)

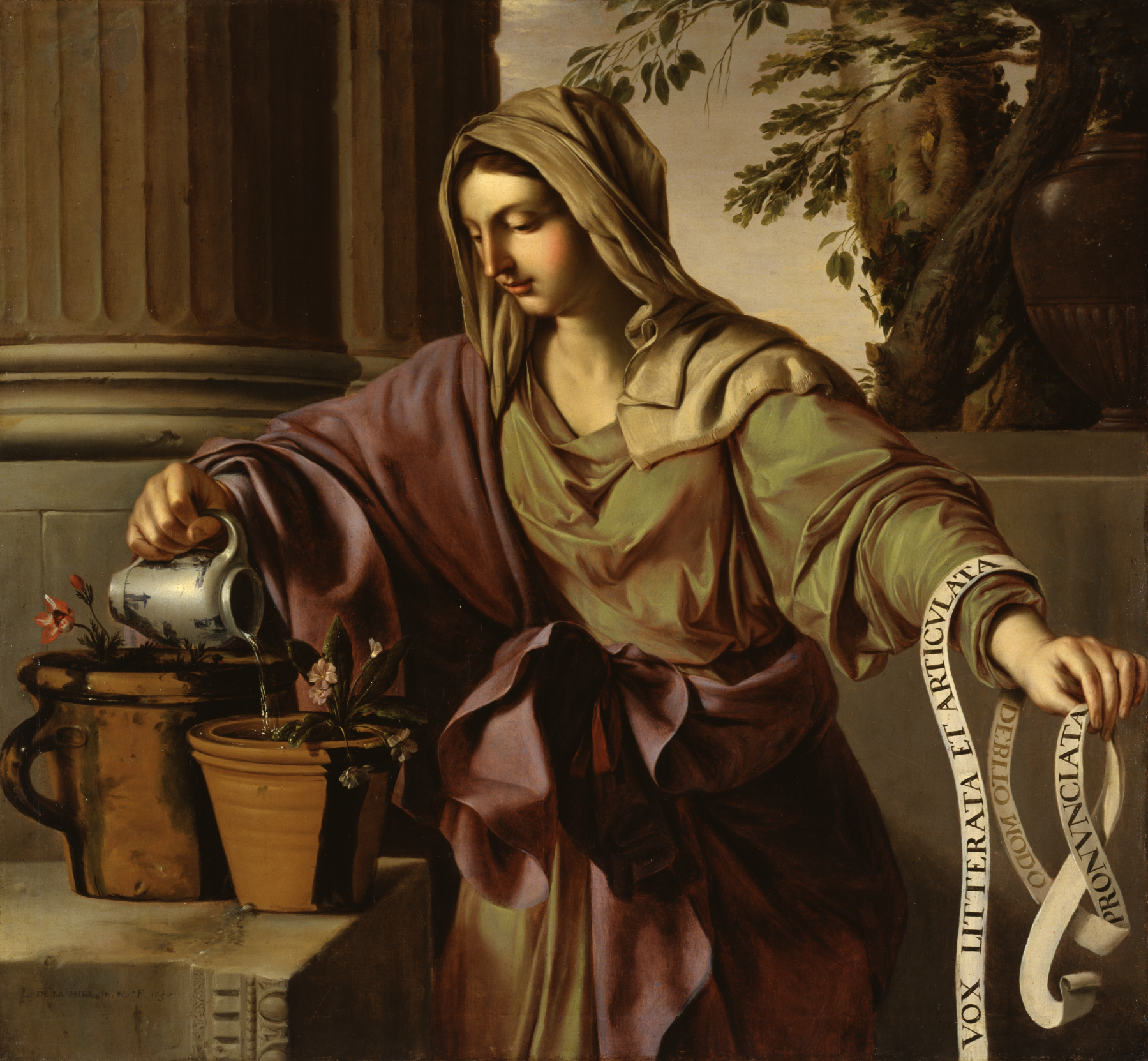
Allegory of Grammar (1650)

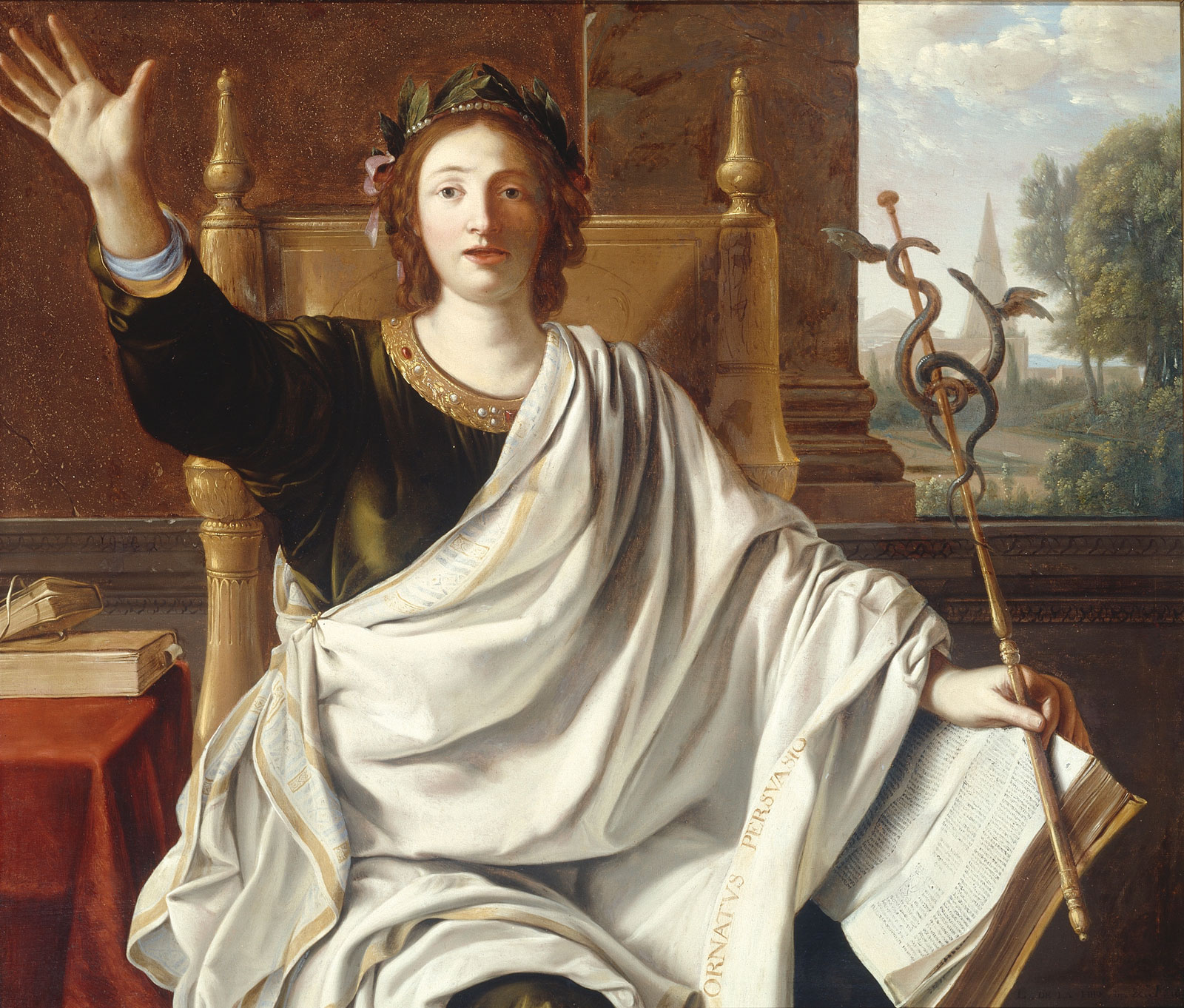
Allegory of Rhetoric (1650)
Biblical themes

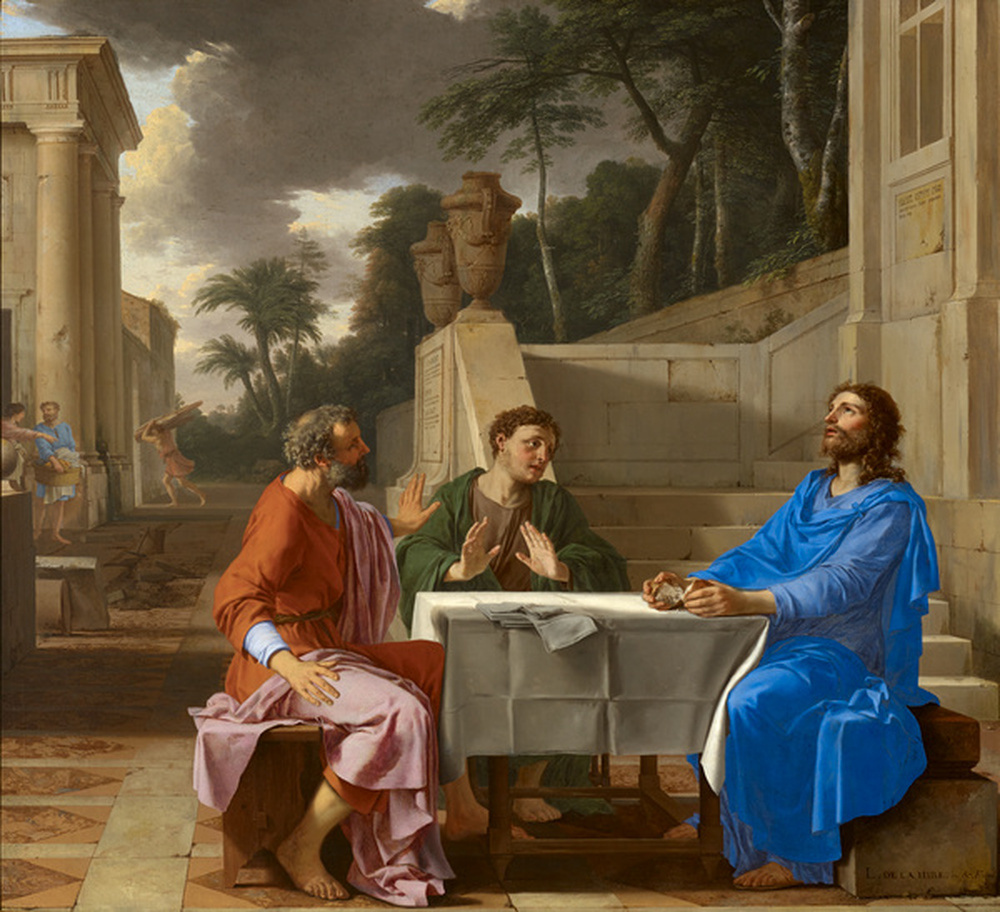
Christ in Emmaus

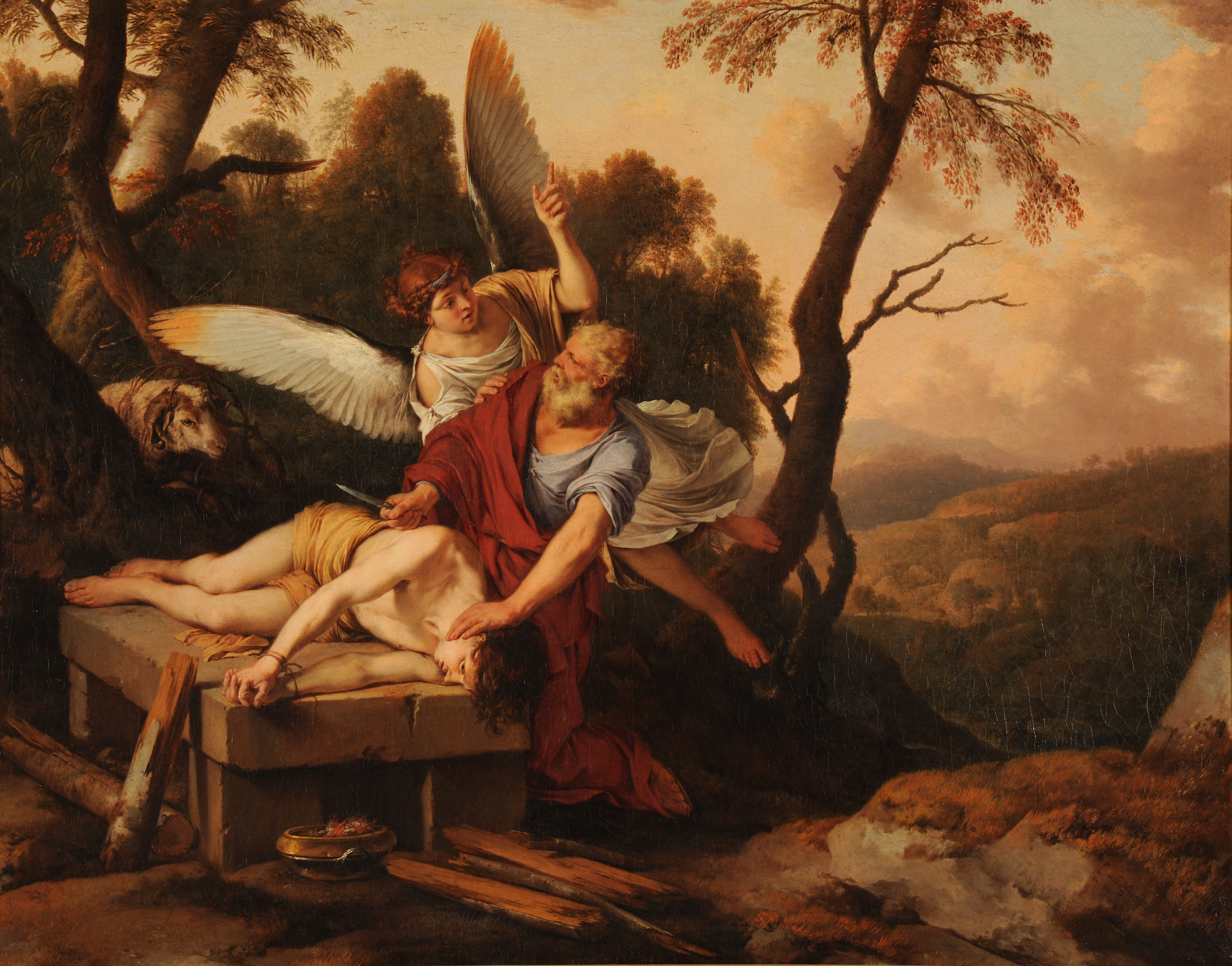
Abraham Sacrificing Isaac

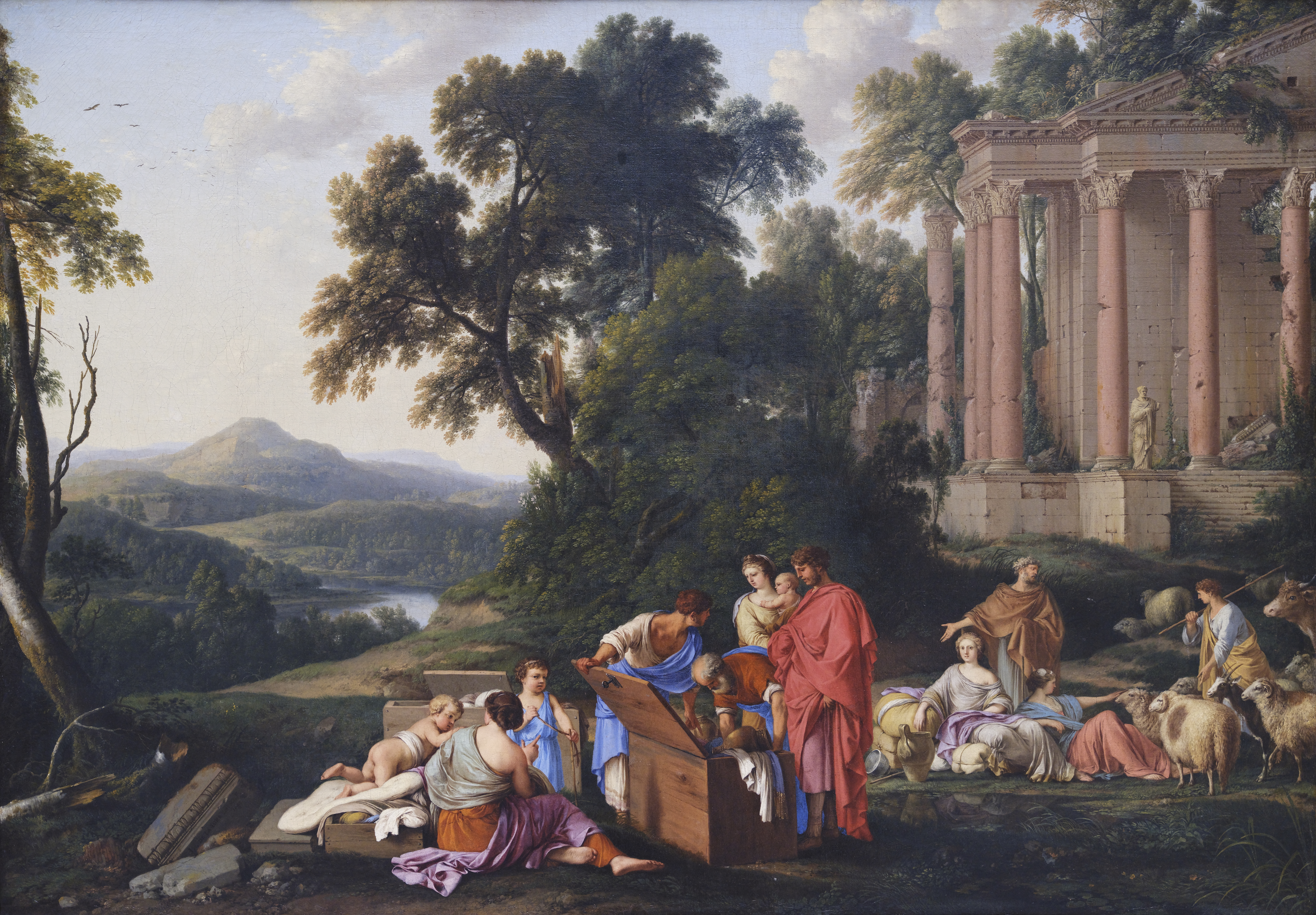
Laban Searching Jacob's Baggage for the Stolen Idols

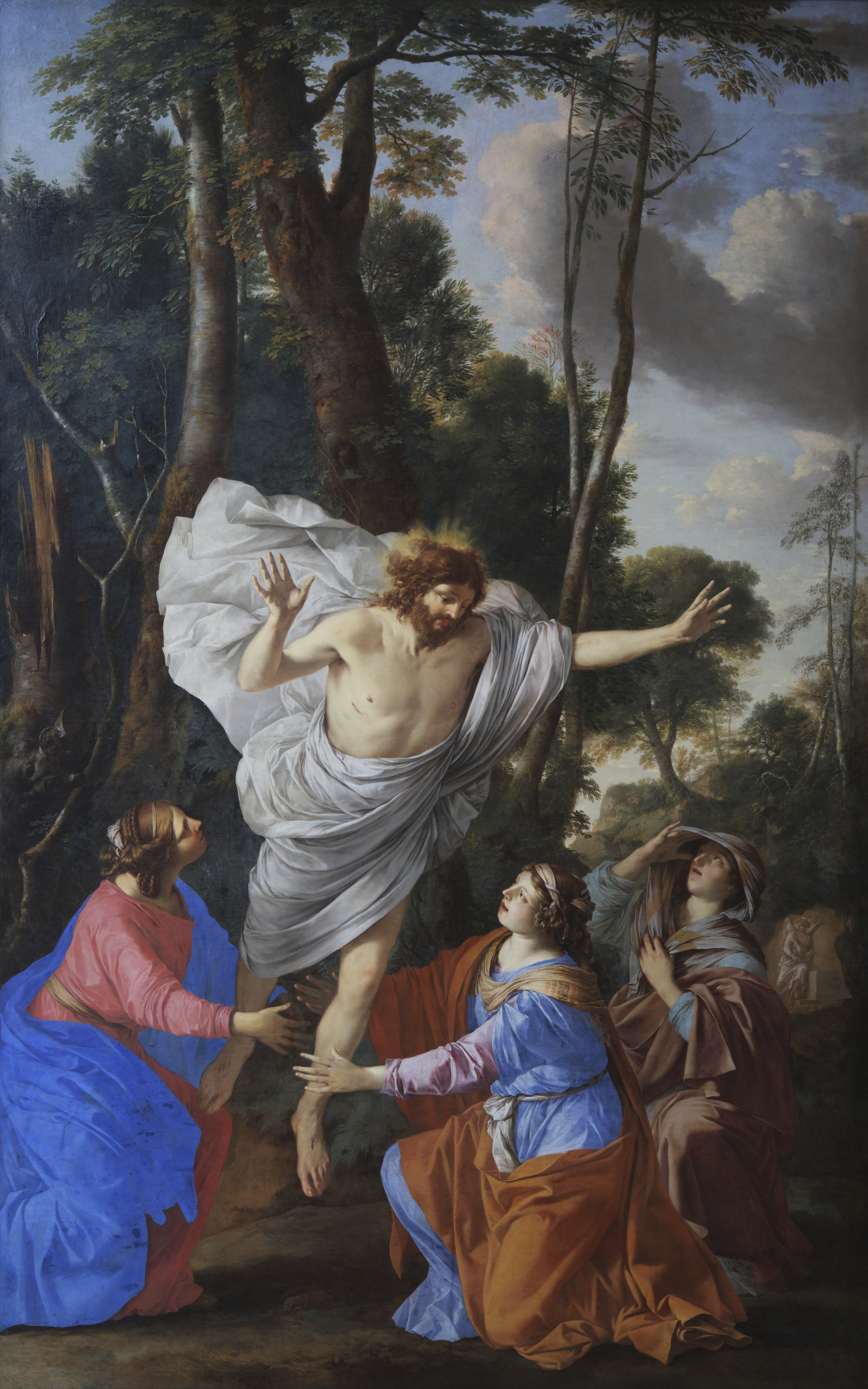
Jesus Appearing to the Three Marys

== Sources ==
- Birmingham Museum of Art (2010). Birmingham Museum of Art Guide to the Catalog. London: Giles. 9781904832775.
