= Mario Nuzzi =

Italian painter (1603–1673)

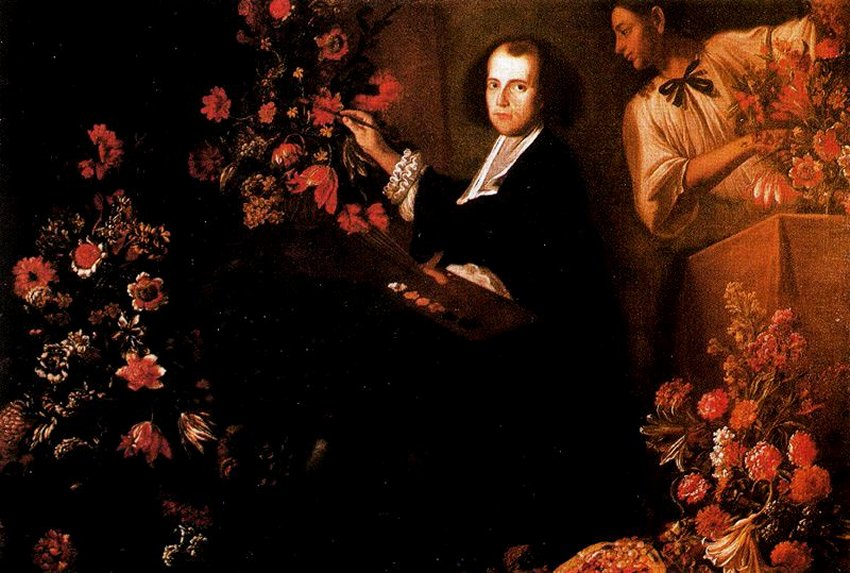
- Self-portrait with Flowers (1640), Florence, Uffizi
- Born: 19 January 1603; Penna San Giovanni, Papal States
- Died: 14 November 1673 (aged 70); Rome, Papal States
- Resting place: San Lorenzo in Lucina
- Other name: Mario de' Fiori
- Education: Tommaso Salini
- Known for: Flower painting
- Movement: Baroque

Mario Nuzzi, who went by the pseudonym Mario de' Fiori (19 January 1603 – 14 November 1673), was an Italian painter in the Baroque style. His paintings are all based around floral arrangements; hence the name Fiori (flowers).

== Biography ==
He was born in Penna San Giovanni the second son of Sisto Nuzzi, a landowner, and his wife Faustina Salini, sister of the still-life painter Tommaso Salini. In 1618, his father took the family back to Penna, where they engaged in floriculture and Mario amused himself by painting the flowers. This led, in 1620, to an apprenticeship in the workshop of his uncle Tommaso. Mario remained there until 1625, when his uncle died. While there, he was influenced by the works of Caravaggio, who had been one of his uncle's associates. In 1628, he married Ortensia de Curtis, from a family of English origin, with whom he had one son.

Once established, he created amicable working relationships with Cassiano dal Pozzo and the Barberini family; all noted patrons of the arts, who not only collected but commissioned many significant works. Notably, illustrations for De florum cultura by Giovanni Battista Ferrari, which were commissioned by Cardinal Francesco Barberini. His popularity with the Barberini led to other notable clients in the church, including Cardinal Giulio Rospigliosi (who would become Pope Clement IX), and Cardinal Mario Theodoli, who promoted his works in France. During this period, his works began to show Flemish influence; especially that of Daniel Seghers.

An especially important contact was made in 1644, when he met Giancarlo de' Medici, who had just been appointed a Cardinal and was a passionate botanist. His commissions for Nuzzi inaugurated the Medici still-life collection and helped diffuse Nuzzi's works throughout Tuscany, where they influenced Giovanni Stanchi, Bartolommeo Ligozzi, Bartolomeo Bimbi and Andrea Scacciati. In 1646, Nuzzi was elected a member of the Congregazione dei Virtuosi al Pantheon.

Summer, 1659, Palazzo Chigi, Ariccia

In 1648, he became a widower. Two years later, he married Susanna Passeri, with whom he had six children. To 1650 dates the Garland with the Dream of Jacob, one of a series of four Garlands (all Madrid, El Escorial) that have scenes drawn from the Old Testament in their centres. In 1657, Nuzzi was accepted as a member of the Accademia di San Luca. After 1658, he did decorative work for Cardinal Flavio Chigi; painting flowers on mirrors and basanite columns. In 1659, he collaborated with other artists to paint the series of the Four Seasons for the Palazzo Chigi in Ariccia. Each painting features flowers by Nuzzi alongside figures by other artists: Spring has figures by Filippo Lauri, Summer by Carlo Maratta, Autumn by Giacinto Brandi, and Winter by Bernardino Mei.

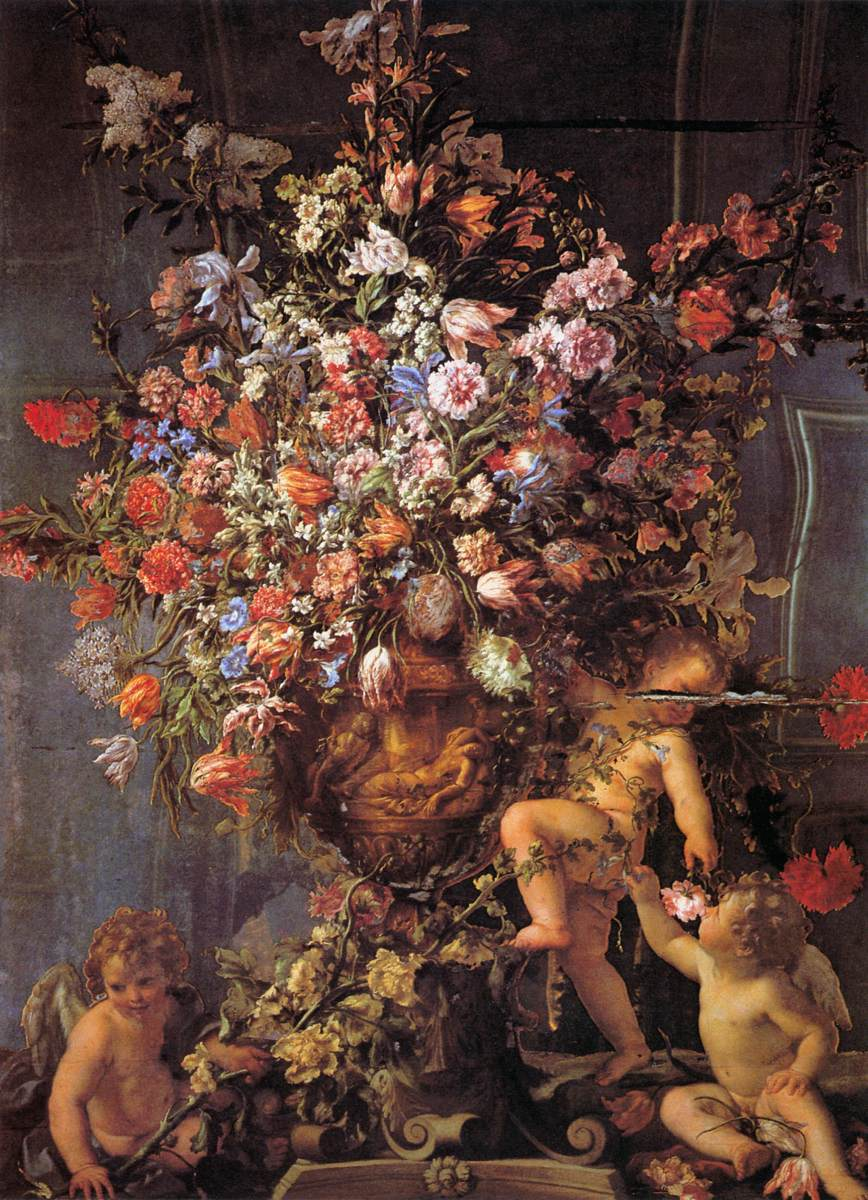
Mirror with Three Putti, 1660, Palazzo Colonna, Ariccia

Nuzzi also collaborated with Maratta in the decoration of two painted mirrors (1660) for the great gallery of the Palazzo Colonna, Rome (in situ), which reveal the influence of Paolo Porpora’s vivid colour and rigorous sense of reality. The individual flowers are studied with such attention that, using colour and the contrast of light and shade, the artist succeeds in rendering their textures while his composition is naturalistic rather than purely decorative. Giovanni Stanchi contributed two painted mirrors to the series, yet the rich and refined compositions of Nuzzi contrast with the dry and flat decorations of Stanchi.

Nuzzi died in Rome in 1673, at the age of seventy, and was interred at the Basilica of San Lorenzo in Lucina. Laura Bernasconi is the only pupil of his mentioned in the sources. The intense naturalism of Mario’s work was not continued by other artists in Rome, and such painters as Giovanni Stanchi, Niccolò Stanchi (1626 /36– c. 1690) and Pietro Paolo Cennini (1661–1739) merely produced trivial, decorative works until the middle of the 18th century. However, the pictures Mario sent to Spain had a deep effect on flower painters there, particularly on Juan de Arellano.

== Gallery ==
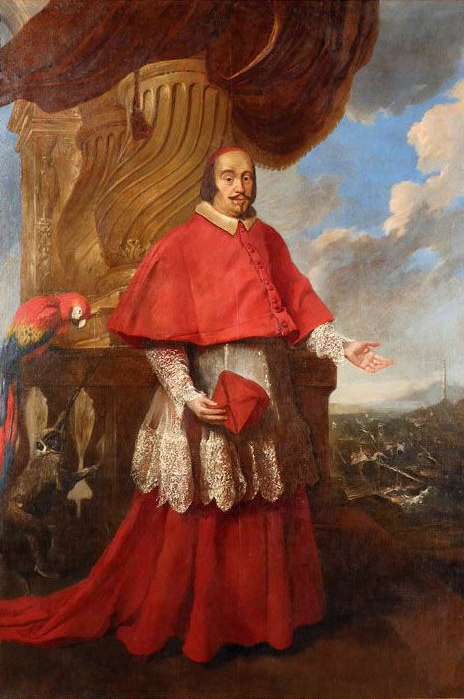
Portrait of Cardinal Ottaviano Raggi, after 1641, priv. col.

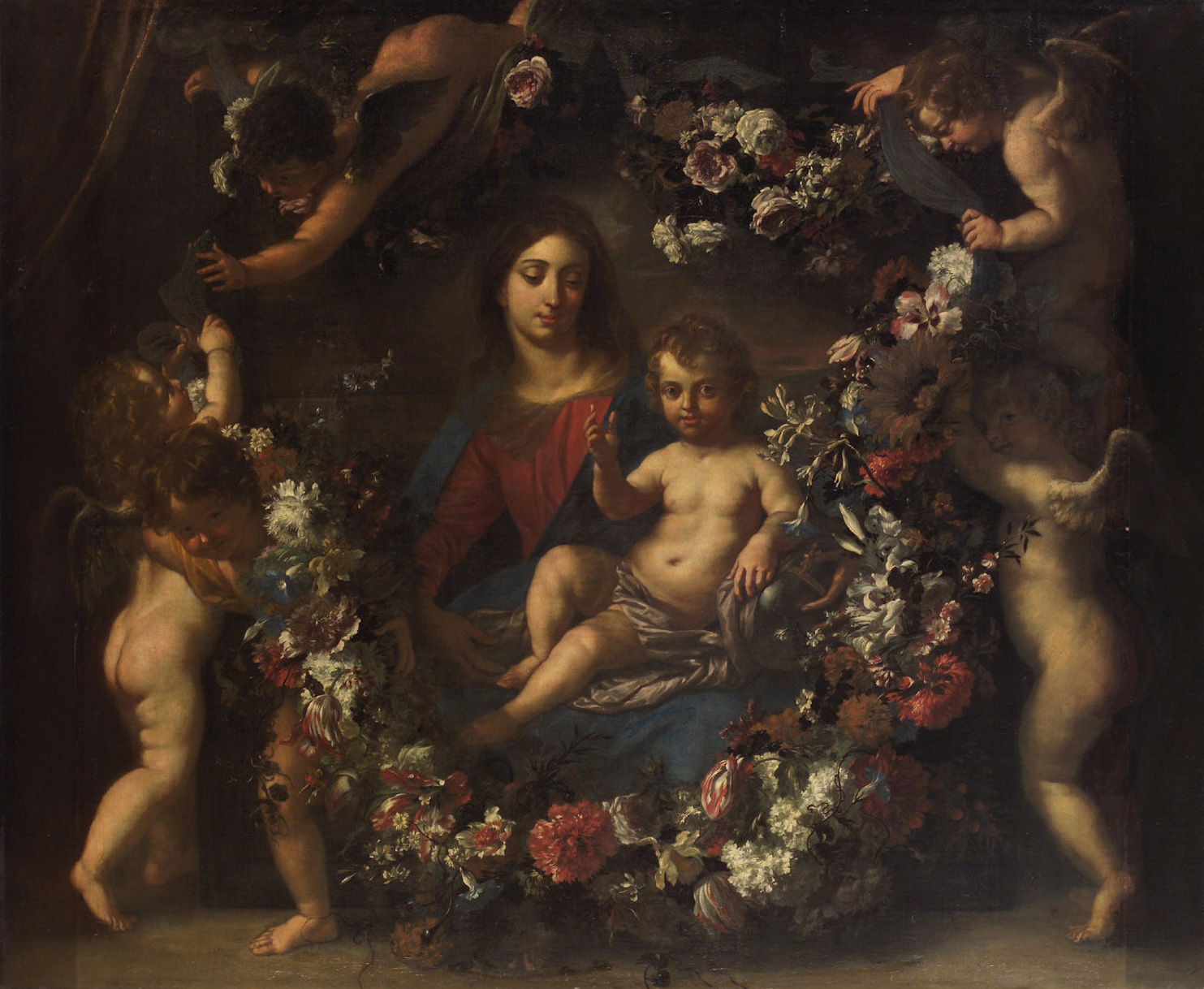
Virgin and Child in a Wreath of Flowers, collaboration with Jan van den Hoecke, 1635-7, Kunsthistorisches Museum, Vienna

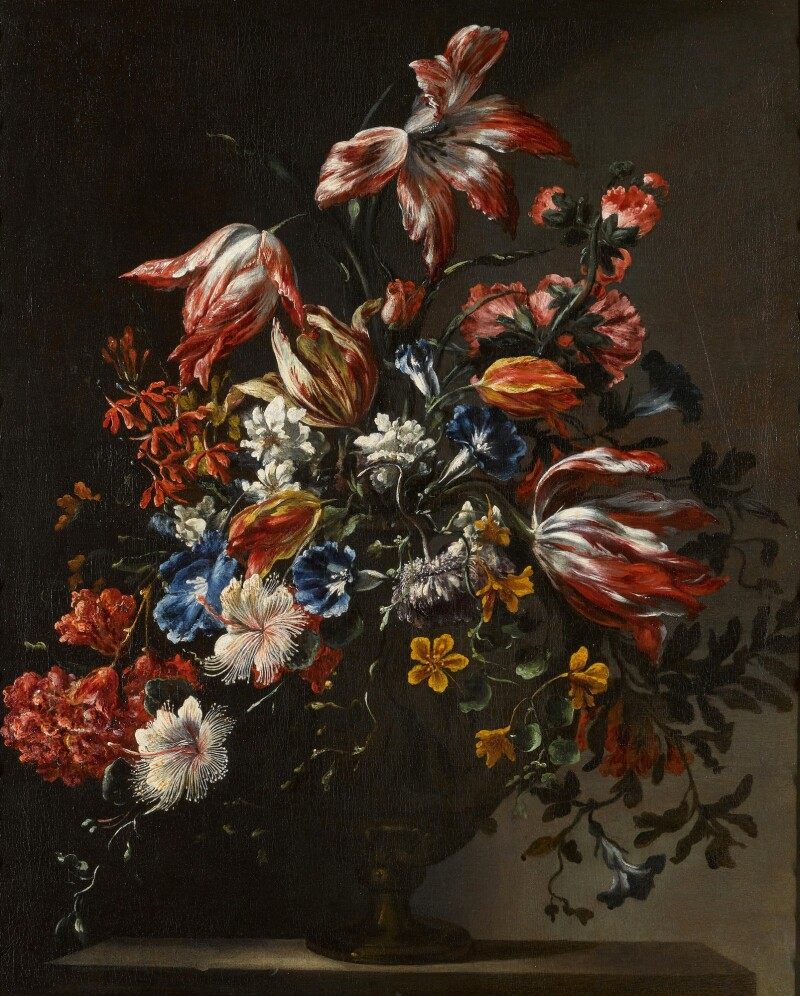
Still Life with Flowers in a Vase, priv col.

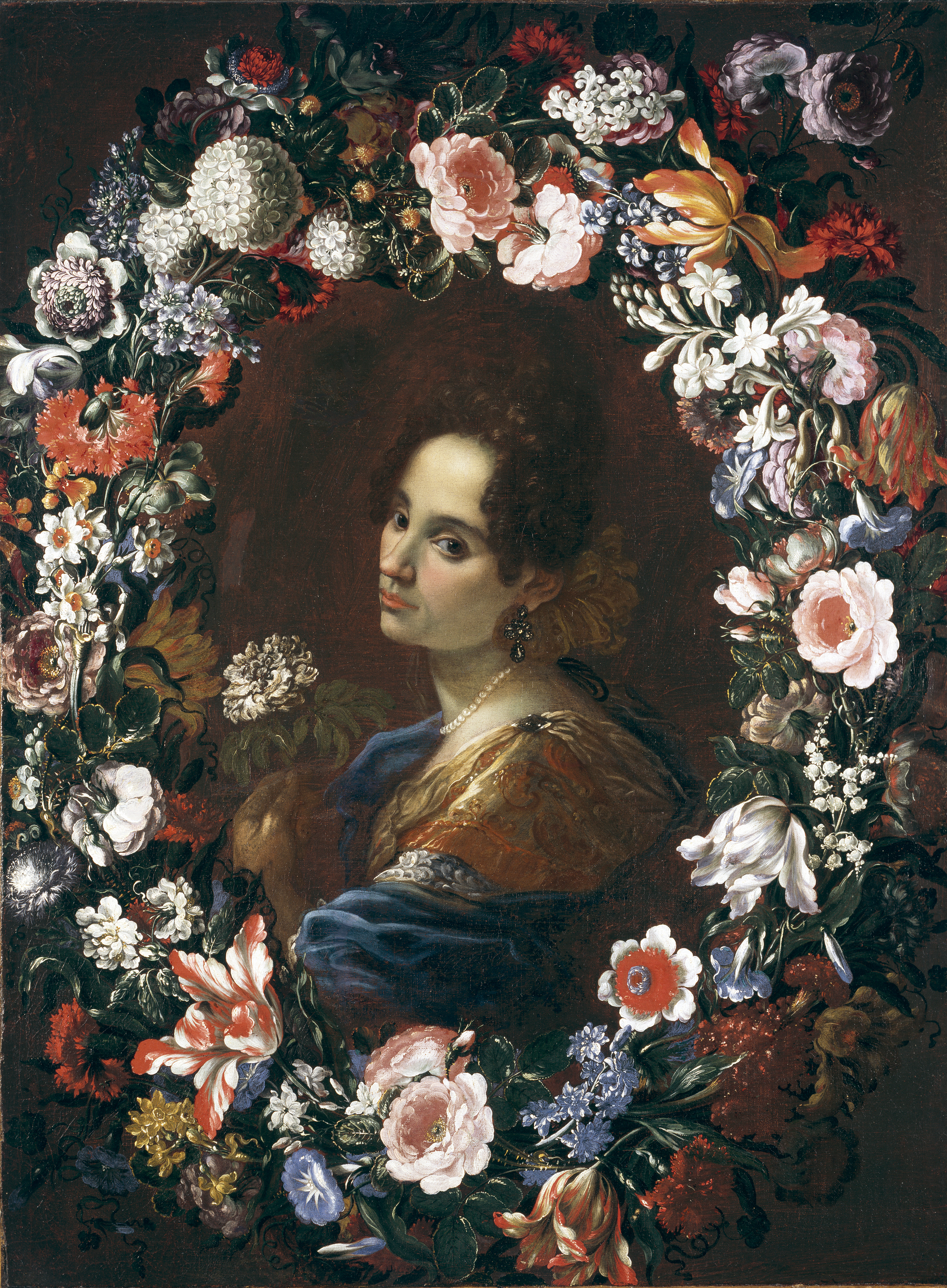
Portrait of a Lady, Surrounded by a Garland of Flowers, National Gallery of Ireland, Dublin

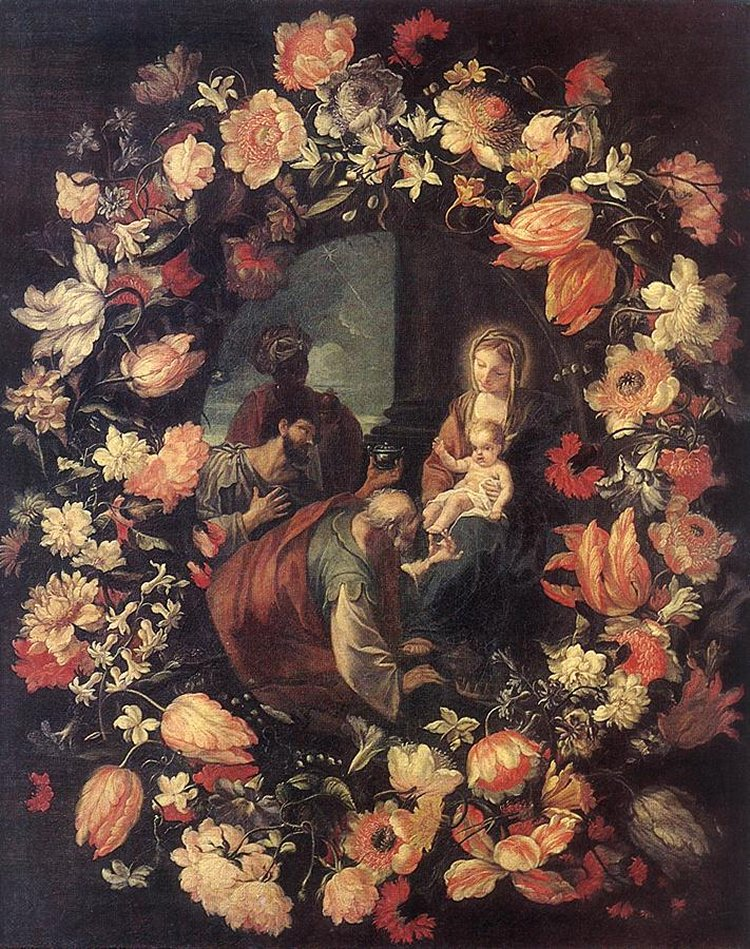
Adoration of the Magi in a Wreath of Flowers, collaboration with Carlo Maratta, Hermitage Museum, Saint Petersburg

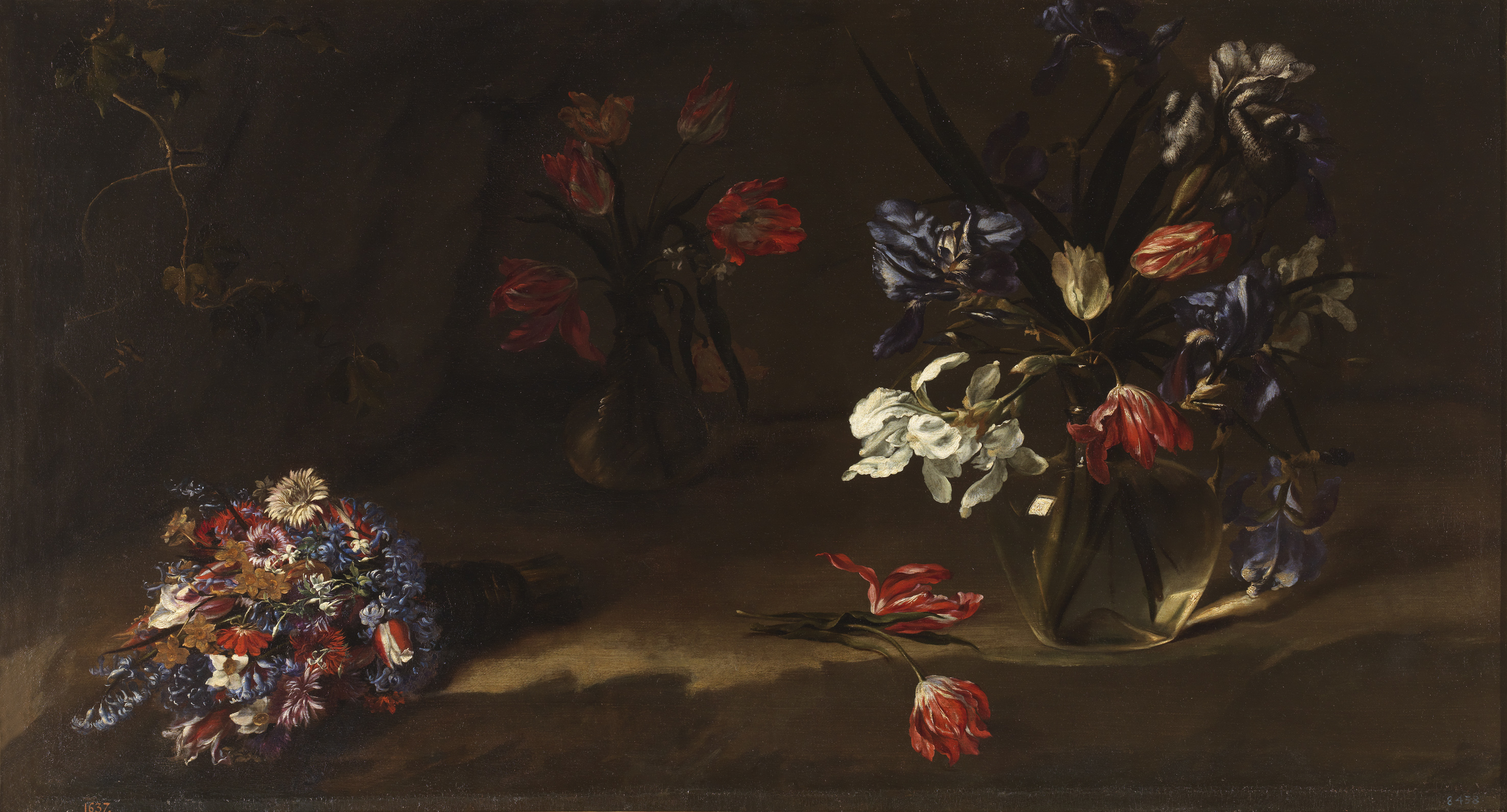
Vase of Flowers, 1640-2, Museo del Prado, Madrid

Vase and Flowers, Guildhall Art Gallery, London

Poultry Yard with Peacock and Peahen, Städel, Frankfurt
