= Ligozzi =

Ligozzi is a surname. Notable people with the surname include:

- Bartolommeo Ligozzi (17th century), Italian painter
- Giovanni Ermano Ligozzi (16th century), Italian painter
- Jacopo Ligozzi (1547–1627), Italian painter, illustrator, designer, and miniaturist
