= Laura Bernasconi =

Italian Baroque painter

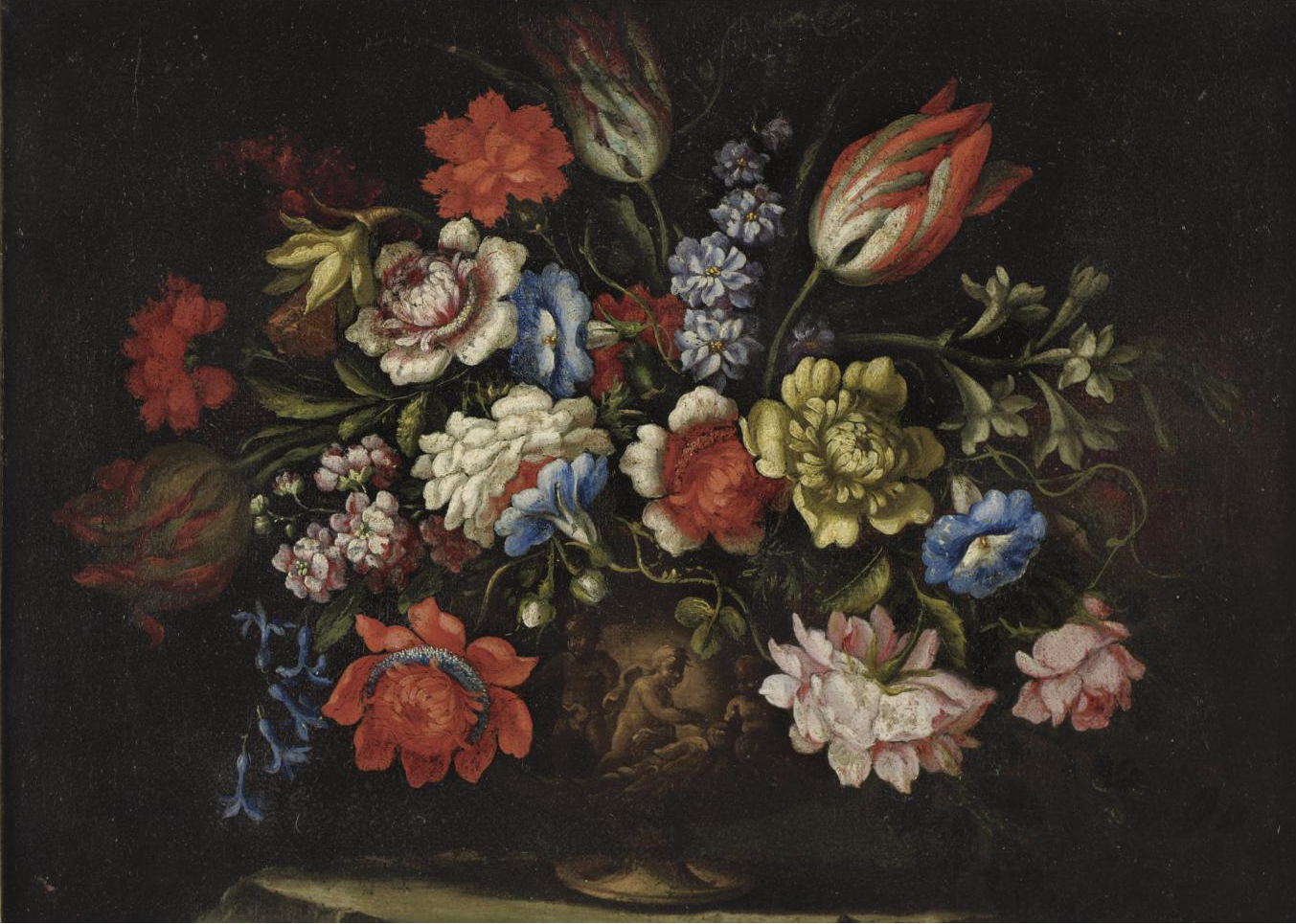
Still-life with Flowers

Laura Bernasconi was an Italian painter of the Baroque period, known to be active in 1674.

== Life ==
Born and died in Rome, she trained with Mario Nuzzi, and like him, painted still life paintings of flowers. She worked in Rome from 1622 to 1675. Little is known about her: she was a pupil of Mario Nuzzi, known as Mario de 'Fiori. Mario Nuzzi was a master of Pier Francesco Cittadini and Paolo Porpora and painted in a style close to that of Francesco Caldei (known as Francesco Mantovano). From Nuzzi she learned to compose large bunches of multicolored flowers.

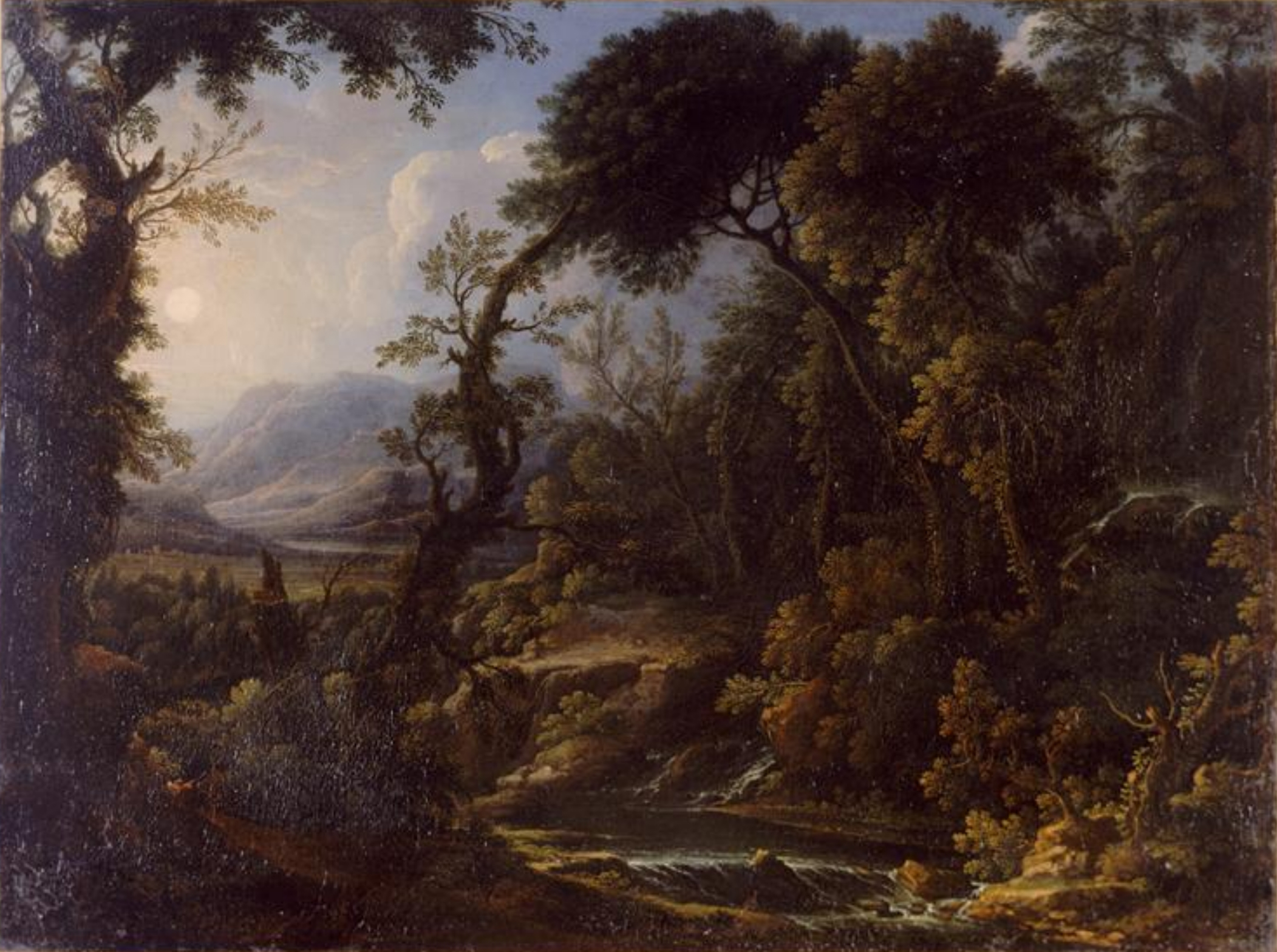
River in a forest

In L'Abecedario pittorico ('ABC of Painting') by the Bolognese writer and art historian Pellegrino Antonio Orlandi we read: Laura Bernasconi, a Roman painter, she learned how to paint the flowers from Mario Nuzzi, and succeeded in perfection, she made the ornamentation of the painting St. Gaetano, painted by Andrea Camassei in St. Andrea della Valle. In the sacristy of this church, there is the altar with the altarpiece of San Gaetano, portrayed in prayer among the Angels. The flowers that embellish the painting are executed by Laura Bernasconi.

== Work ==
Laura Bernasconi painted, with Carlo Ruthard and her son Filippo, between 1665 and 1668, the ceiling of the Gallery in Palazzo Colonna. Her works are in collections in Rome, including the Galleria Doria Pamphilj.
