= Bernardino Mei =

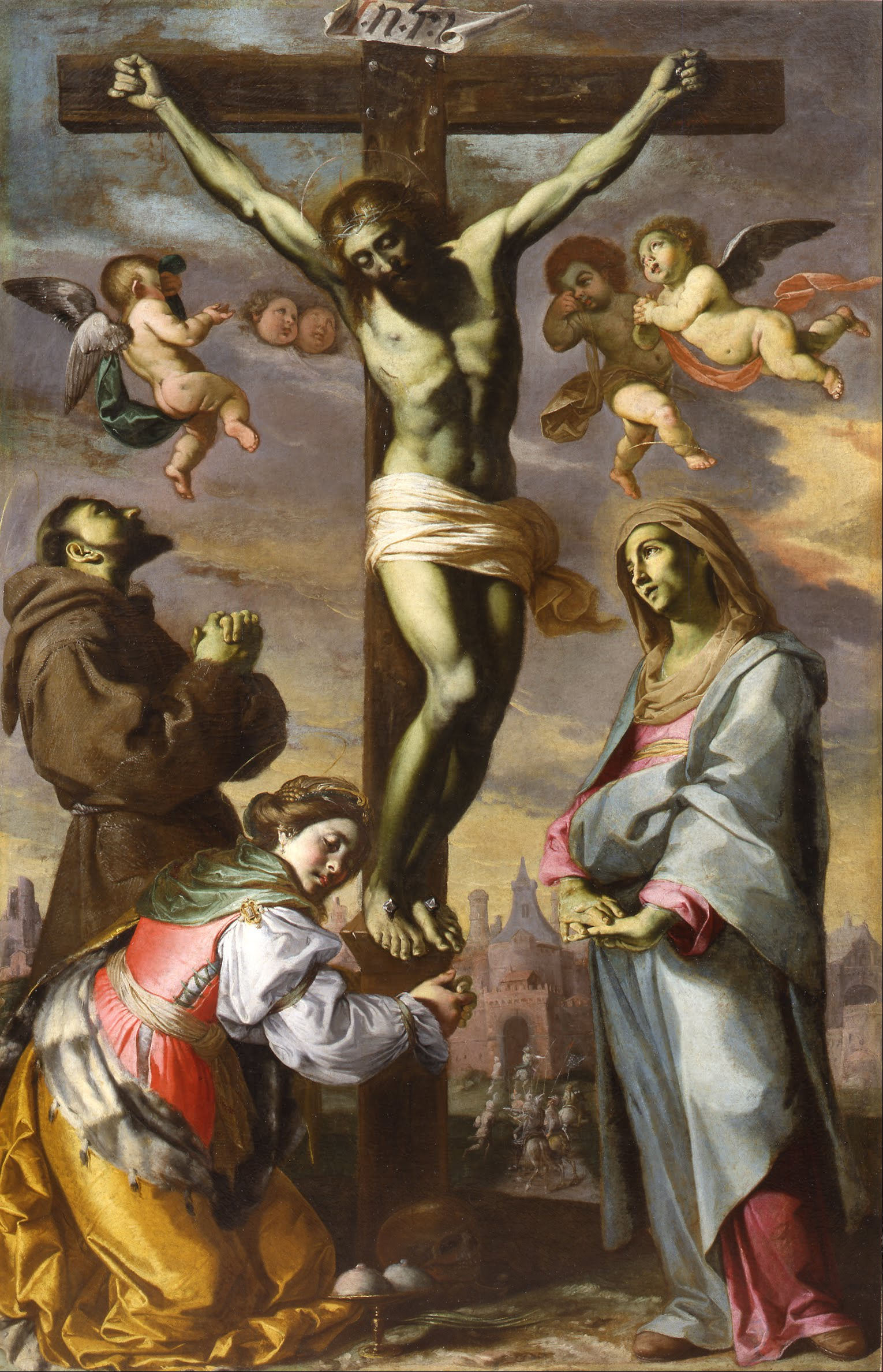
- Crucifix with the Virgin and Saints Francis and Agatha, c. 1650, Fondazione Musei Senesi, Siena
- Born: 23 October 1612; Siena, Italy
- Died: 1676 (aged 63–64); Rome, Italy
- Education: Giuliano Periccioli; Rutilio Manetti
- Known for: Painting
- Movement: Baroque

Bernardino Mei (23 October 1612 – 1676) was an Italian painter and engraver, who worked in a Baroque manner in his native Siena and in Rome, finding patronage above all in the Chigi family.

== Biography ==
=== Early life and education ===
Briefly a pupil of the Sienese cartographer and draughtsman Giuliano Periccioli, where he learned the art of engraving, Bernardino passed to the studio of the painter Rutilio Manetti and probably also served in the workshop of Francesco Rustici.

He painted in and around Siena, where he came under the influences of Mattia Preti, Andrea Sacchi and Pier Francesco Mola, and of Guercino, to the extent that until the 20th century Bernardino's fresco of Aurora in Palazzo Bianchi Bandinelli was attributed to Guercino himself.

=== Maturity ===
Mei reached maturity in the 1650s, when, rejecting Preti’s influence, he created a series of outstanding works, distinguished by complex rhythms and forms and great expressive power, inspired by Roman painting and the sculpture of Gian Lorenzo Bernini. Through the fast friendship that bonded him to Bernini, whose studio he frequented, he applied that sculptor's sense of theatrical action to his own mythological and allegorical subjects.

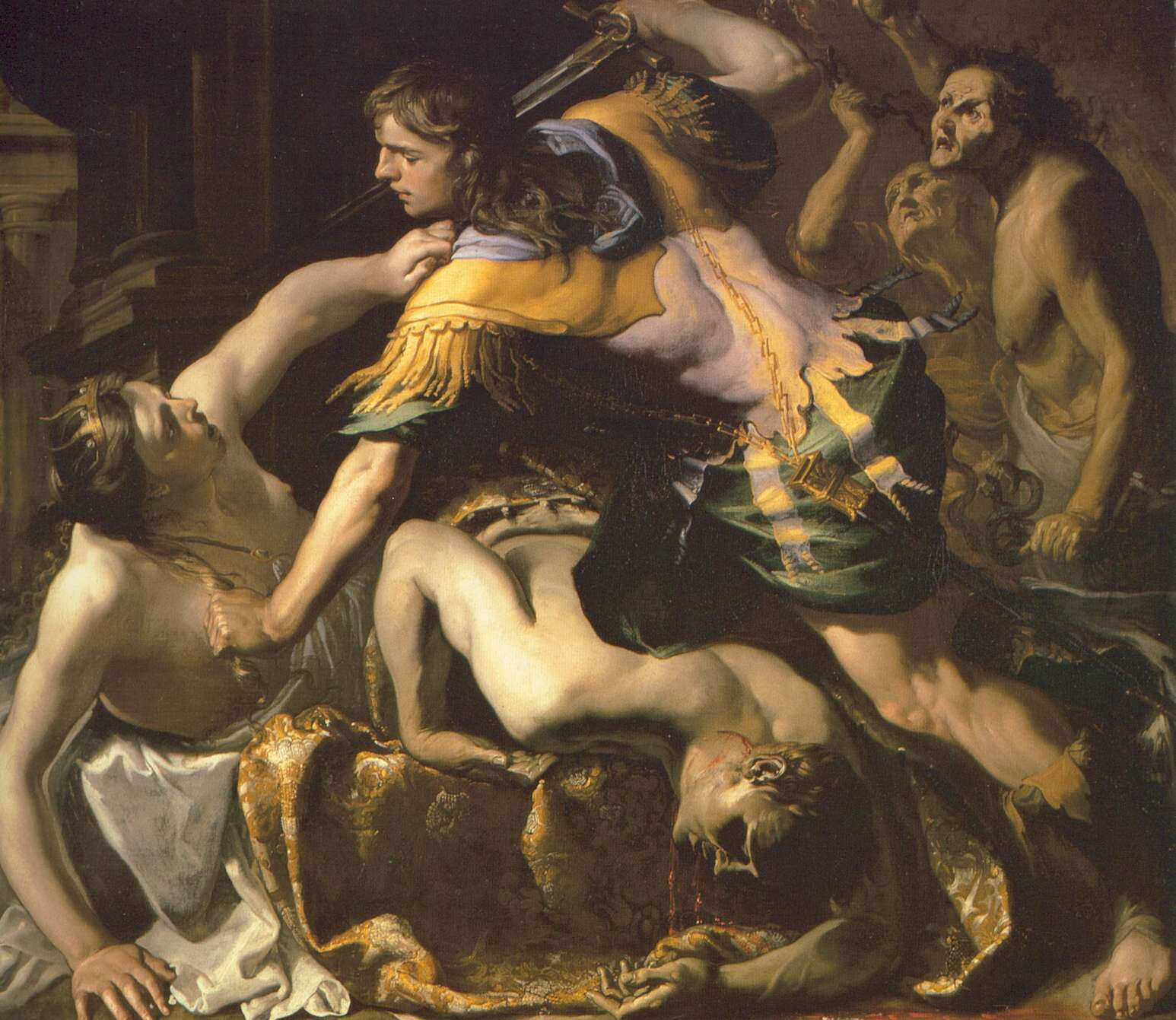
Orestes Slaying Clytemnestra, 1655

Most of Mei's mature works portray allegorical subjects or scenes from Classical history and include Love Healed by Time with Water from the River Lethe (1653) and its companion Fortune between Virtue and Necessity (1654); Orestes Killing Aegisthus and Clytemnestra (1654) and its companion Artemisia Drinking the Ashes of King Mausolus Mixed with her own Tears; The Charlatan (1656; all Siena, Monte Paschi); and Faith (1656) and Hope (both Siena, Palazzo Chigi-Saracini).

Also mainly from the same period are a group of drawings (Siena, Col. Chigi–Saraceni; Florence, Uffizi) and a group of signed and dated engravings (e.g. Atlas and Hercules Supporting the Universe, 1656; Siena, Bib. Com. Intronati). The subject of the painting of Alexander the Great and the Fates (Cincinnati Art Museum) alludes to Pope Alexander VII, suggesting a date after his election in 1655. In 1657 Mei was summoned by Alexander VII to Rome, where in the same year he was elected to the Accademia di San Luca.

=== In Rome ===
In Rome he executed a number of paintings for the Pope, including a Rest on the Flight into Egypt (1659; Rome, Santa Maria del Popolo) and two scenes from the Life of St. John the Baptist (both 1659; Rome, Santa Maria della Pace). In its lighter palette and more monumental and sculptural forms, the former shows Mei’s response to the new classicism of Carlo Maratta. The latter two paintings, however, return to the naturalism of Preti, as does Mei’s Winter (Ariccia, Palazzo Chigi), painted for Cardinal Flavio Chigi in collaboration with Mario Nuzzi. Mei executed many works for this patron for his palazzo in Ariccia and for that in the Piazza Santi Apostoli, Rome. Among those that have been identified are St. Augustine Meditating on the Trinity (1665), completed for the collegiate church at Ariccia, and Fortune Donated by Virtue (Rome, Min. Grazia & Giustizia). These late works are less sculptural, while such pictures as the Mary Magdalene (Siena, Monte Paschi) attain a new psychological depth. Mei died in Rome in 1676.

== Legacy ==
In the 19th century, Bernardino was dismissed as a tame follower of greater lights, but his painting was re-evalued in the later 20th century, expressed in the exhibition Bernardino Mei e la pittura barocca a Siena, Siena, 1987.

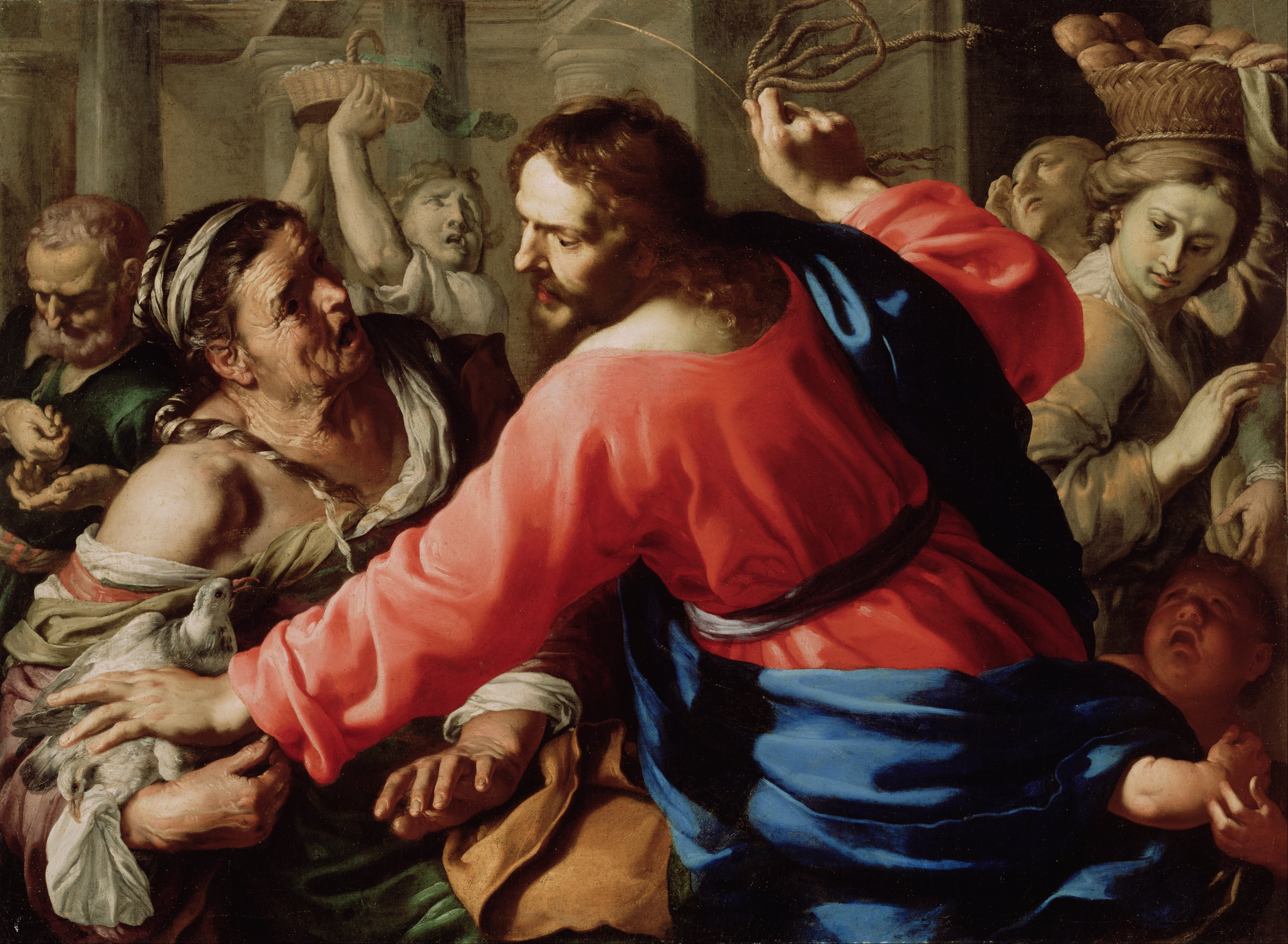
Christ Cleansing the Temple, c. 1655 (J. Paul Getty Museum)

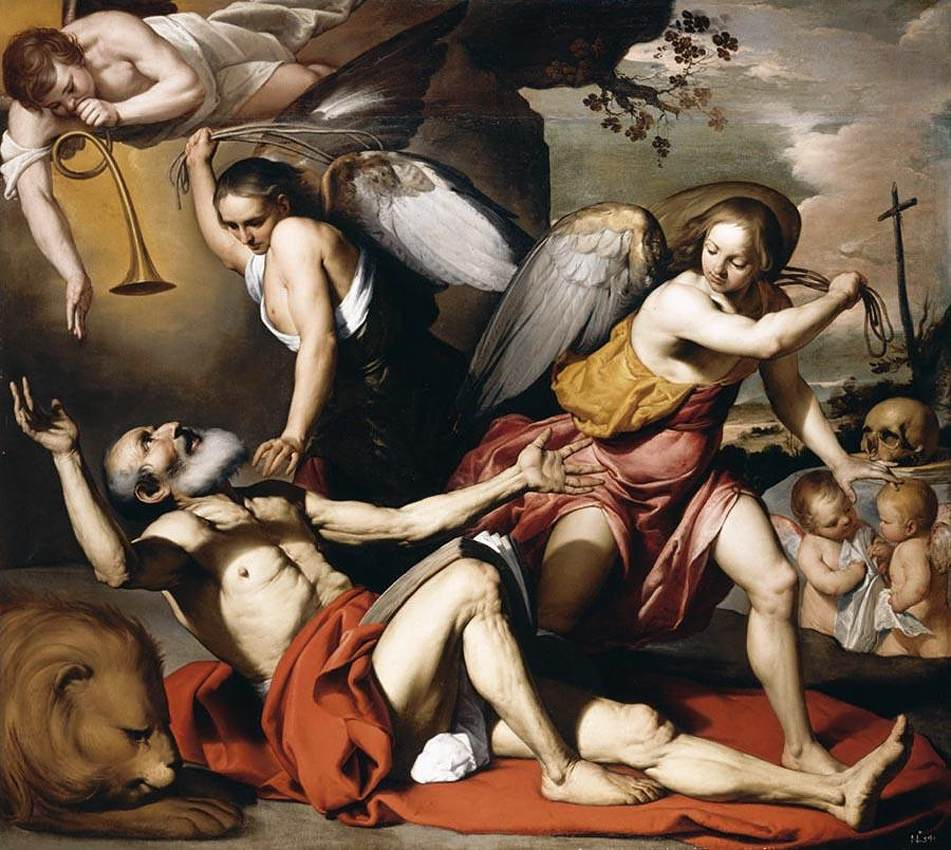
The Vision of St Jerome, 1657–1660, priv. col.

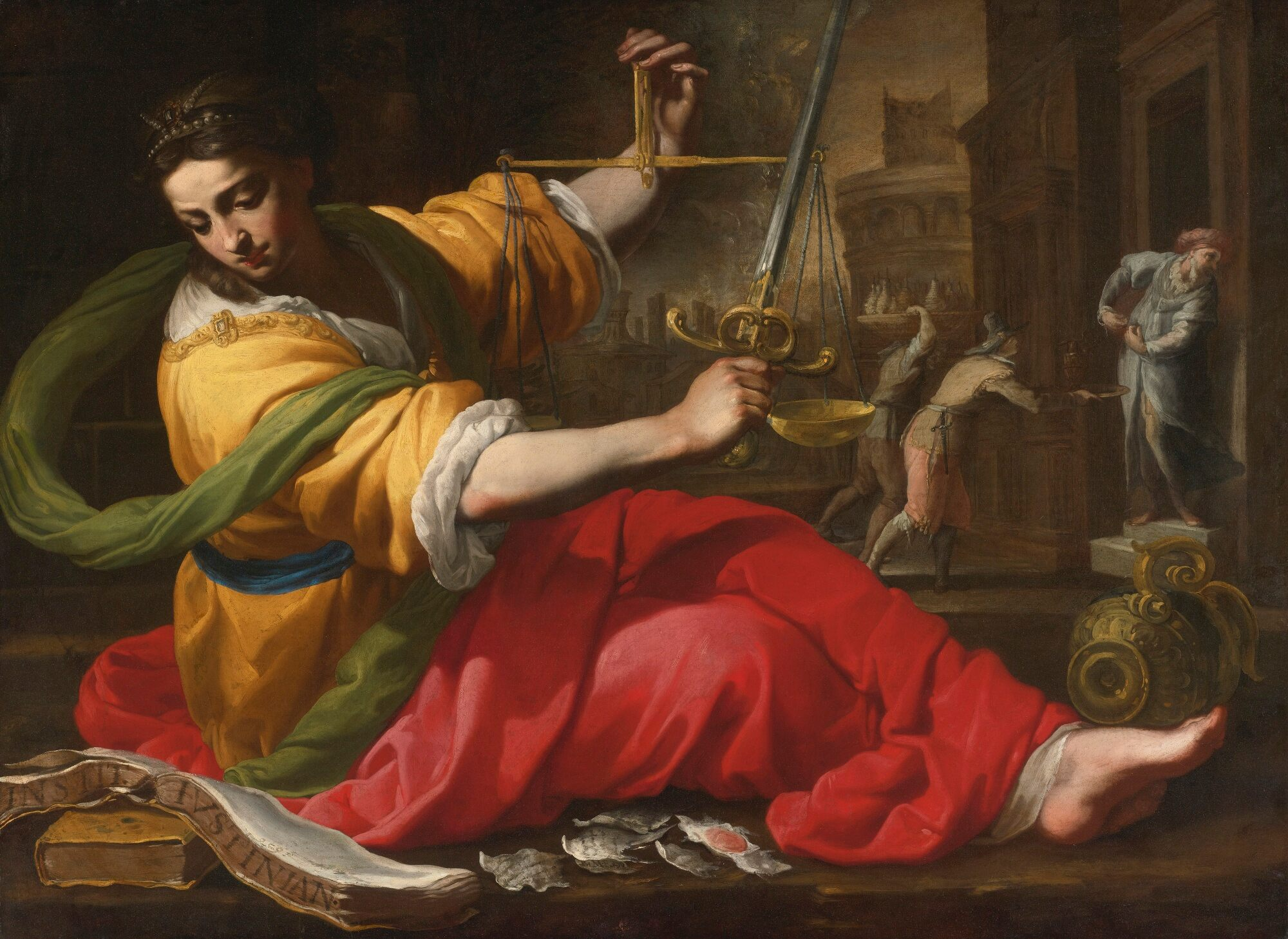
Allegory of Justice, 1656, priv. col.

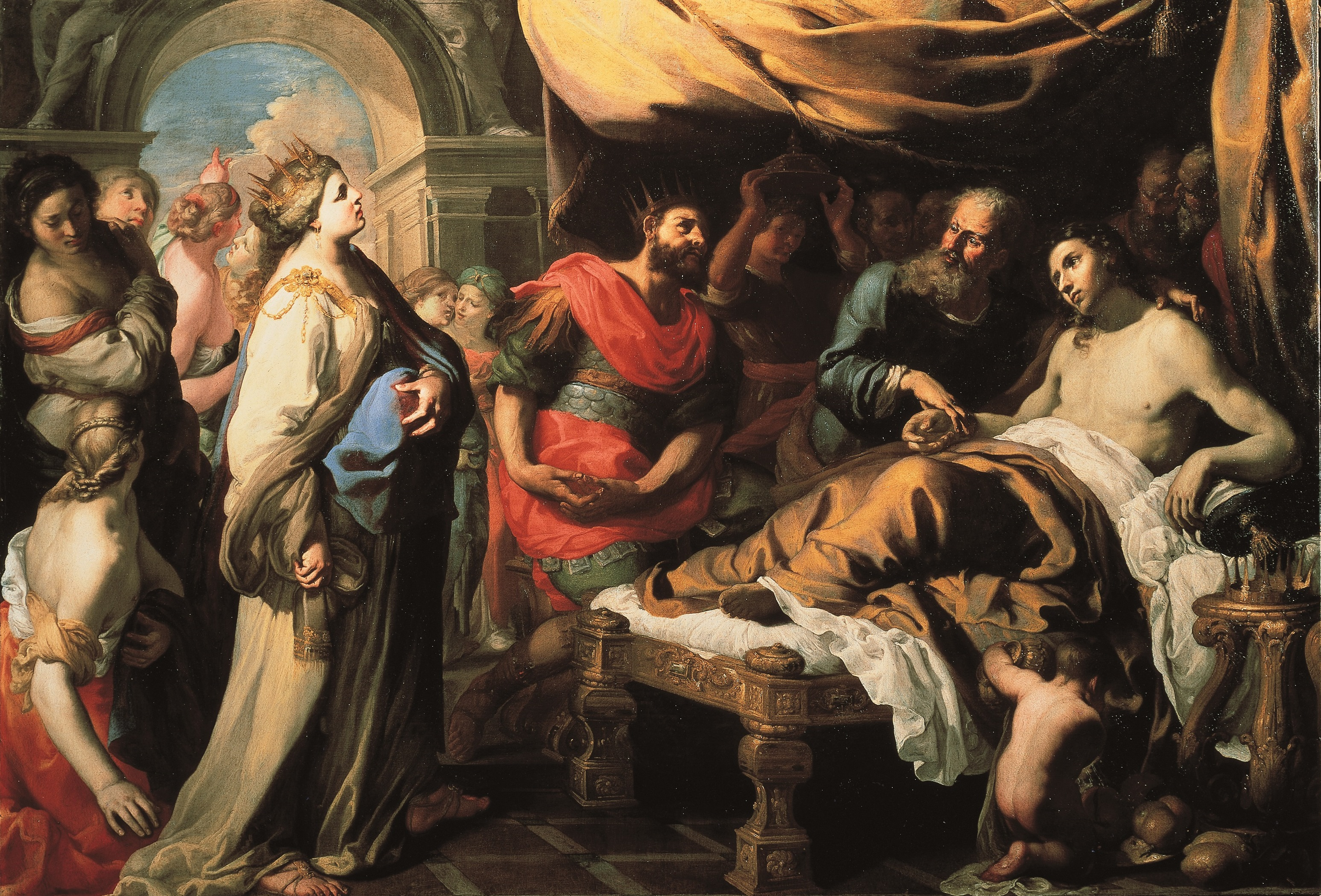
Antiochius et Stratonice, c. 1650, col. Monte dei Paschi

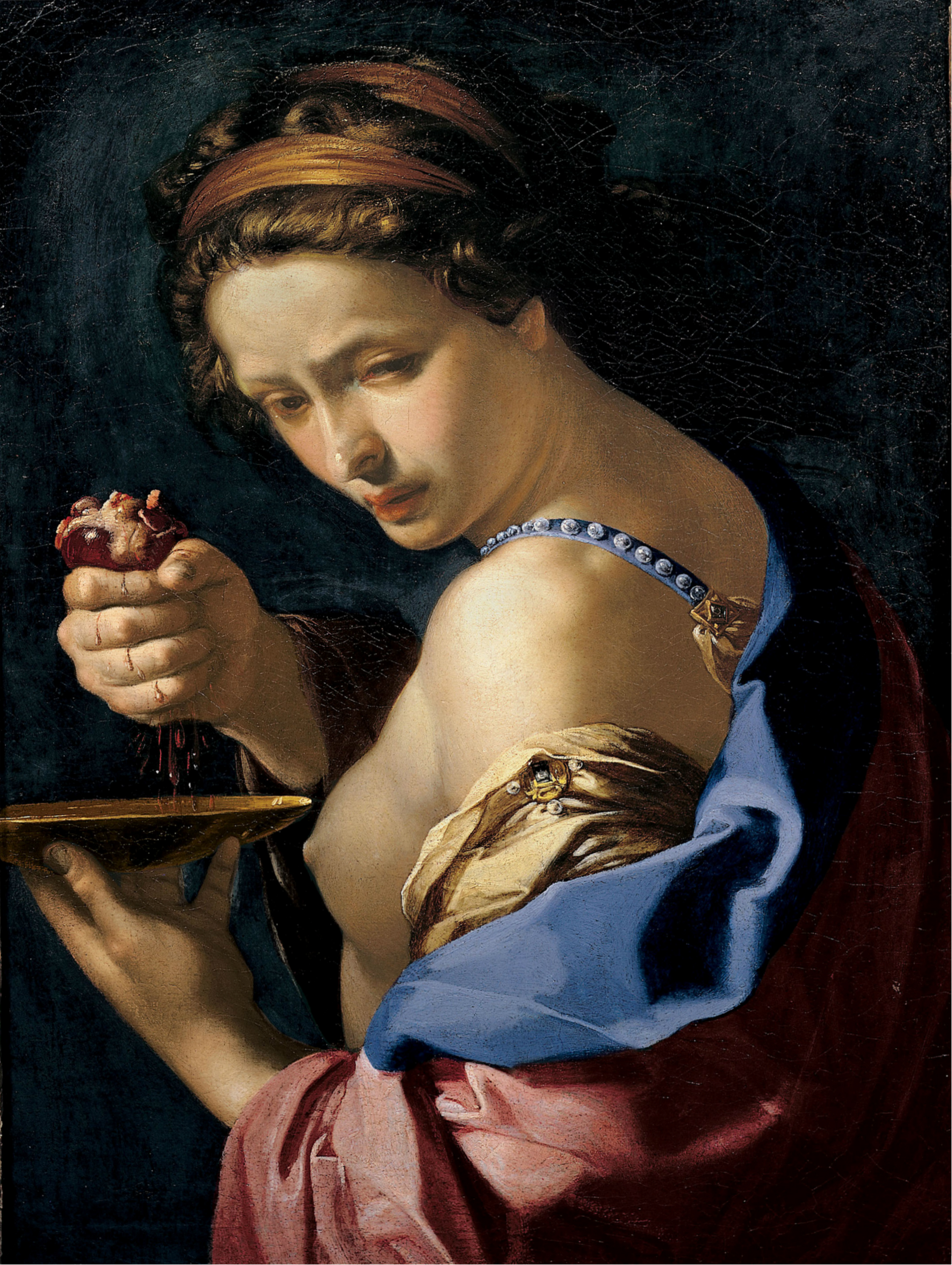
Ghismunda, 1650–1659, Palazzo Chigi–Piccolomini, Siena
