= Mantovani (surname) =

Mantovani is an Italian surname. Notable people with the surname include:

- Alberto Mantovani (born 1948), Italian physician and immunologist
- Alessandro Mantovani (1814–1892), Italian painter
- Annunzio Paolo Mantovani (1905–1980), Anglo-Italian conductor
- Bruno Mantovani (born 1974), French composer
- Cencio Mantovani (1941–1989), Italian cyclist
- Francesco Mantovani (1587/88–1674), Italian still life painter
- Giovanni Mantovani (born 1955), Italian cyclist
- Luca Mantovani (born 1968), Italian ice dancer and coach
- Luigi Mantovani (1880–1957), Italian painter
- Blessed Maria Domenica Mantovani (1862-1934), Italian Roman Catholic professed religious
- Mario Mantovani (born 1950), Italian politician
- Martín Mantovani (born 1984), Argentine footballer
- Roberto Mantovani (1854–1933), Italian geologist and violinist
- Roger Mantovani (1966–2025), Italian radio presenter and actor
- Tomás Altamirano Mantovani (c. 1960–2009), Panamanian politician and National Assembly deputy

== See also ==
- Mantovan
- Mantovano
