= Mantovano =

Mantovano is an Italian surname. Notable people with the surname include:

- Battista Mantovano (1447–1516), Italian Carmelite reformer, humanist, and poet
- Francesco Mantovano or Francesco Caldei (1587/88 – 22 May 1674), Italian still life painter
- Rossino Mantovano (16th century), Italian composer

== See also ==
- Mantovan
- Mantovani (surname)
