= Andrea Scacciati =

Italian painter

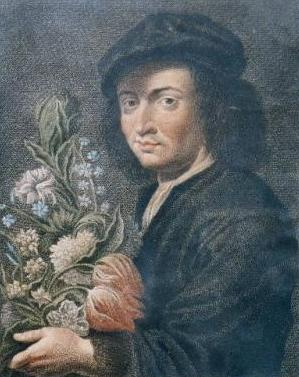
Aquatint of Scacciati by Carlo Lasinio (1790s), probably after a self-portrait

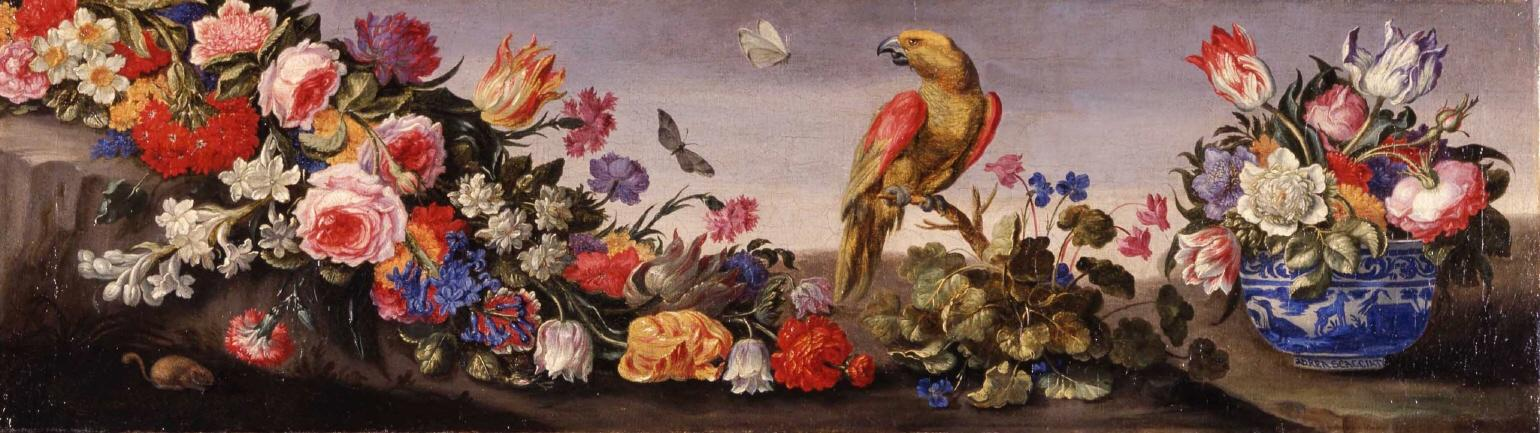
Bowl of Flowers and Bird in a Garden

Andrea Scacciati (12 August 1642, Florence - 6 June 1710, Florence) was an Italian painter in the Baroque style, known mostly for his flower paintings.

He is often confused with the engraver, Andrea Scacciati (1725-1771), sometimes referred to as "The Younger", who was also from Florence. Their relationship, if any, is unclear.

== Life and work ==
He was a student of Mario Balassi and Lorenzo Lippi. For many years, he was an official painter to the Grand Duchess of Tuscany, Vittoria della Rovere. He often worked in collaboration with Bartolomeo Bimbi, under command of the Médicis, to produce tableaux featuring animals and plants.

His tableaux are mentioned in the inventories of the Villa di Poggio Imperiale. Many of his works were in the possession of Cosimo III de' Medici, who installed them in the Villa Medicea della Topaiait and the Villa Medicea L'Ambrogiana. His paintings of bouquets are distinguished from those of Bimbi by darker shading, brighter colors and the use of Baroque vases.

There is some indication, from 1698, that he also worked with the sculptor, Giovanni Battista Foggini, making colored mosaic tiles for furniture and other small items.

His son, Pietro Neri Scacciati (1684-1749), was also a painter and appears to have specialized in birds.
