= Villa Medicea L'Ambrogiana =

Building in Montelupo Fiorentino, Italy

Coordinates: 43°43′51″N 11°00′52″E

Villa Medicea dell’Ambrogiana
- Villa L'Ambrogiana
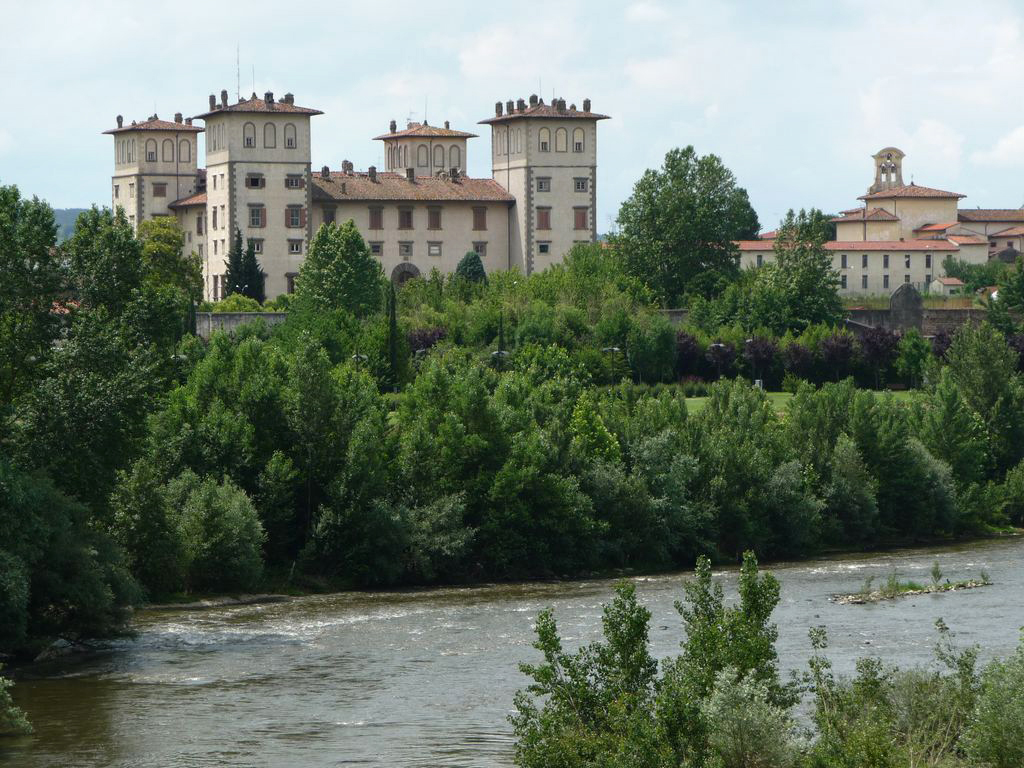
- Villa Medicea dell'Ambrogiana

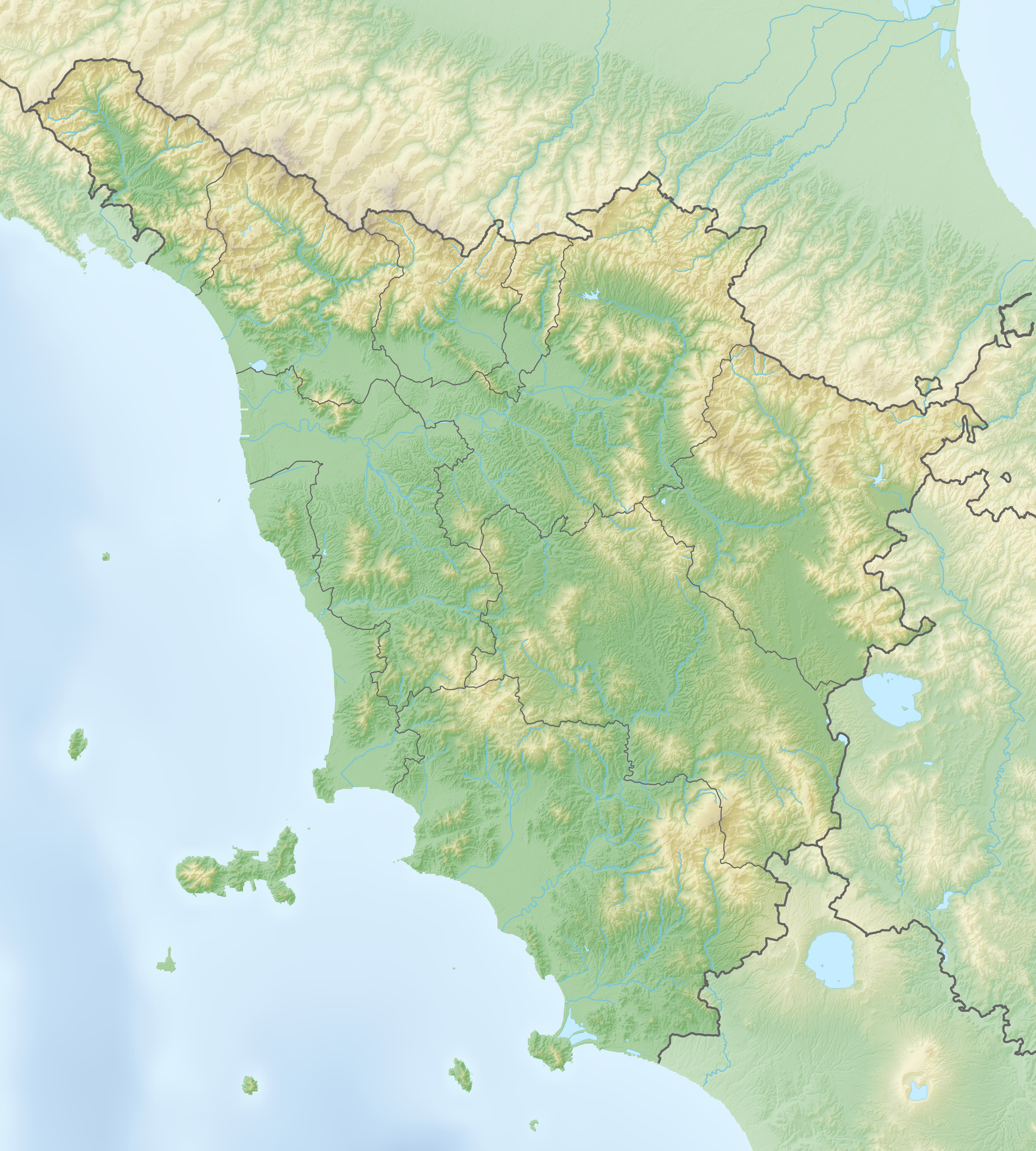
- Location within Tuscany

General information
- Architectural style: Late Renaissance
- Location: Montelupo Fiorentino, Tuscany, Italy
- Year built: c. 1587
- Owner: Italian State

Design and construction
- Architects: Attributed to Bernardo Buontalenti; involvement of Raffaele Pagni documented

The Villa L'Ambrogiana was a rural palace or villa built during the late-Renaissance by Ferdinand I de' Medici; it is located at the confluence of the rivers Pesa and Arno, in the municipality of Montelupo Fiorentino.

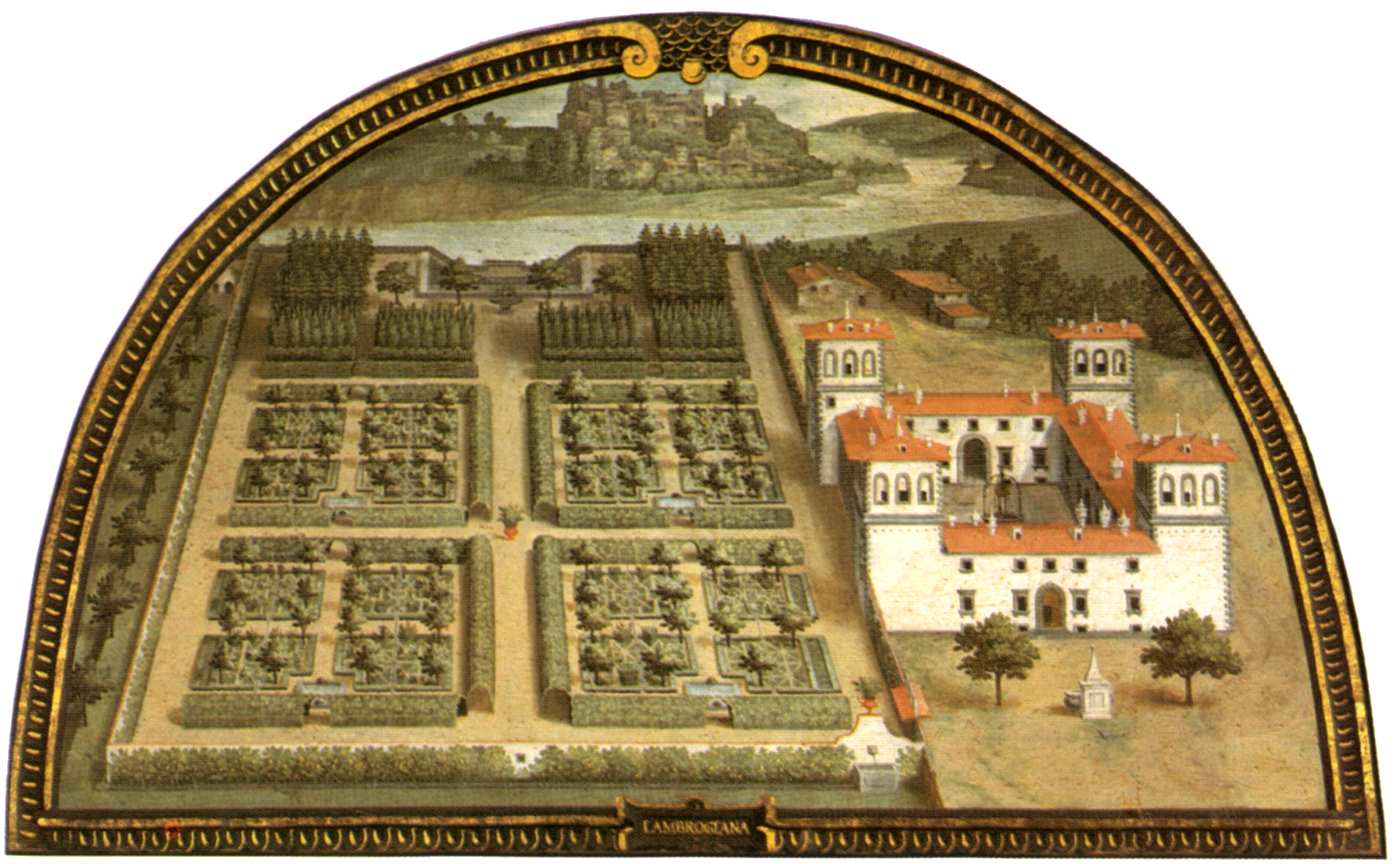
Utens' lunette of L'Ambrogiana (circa 1600)

== History ==
The site was originally occupied by a casino owned by the Hordinghetti family, later sold to the Corboli, and eventually acquired by the Medici. The current palace was constructed around 1587, possibly designed by Bernardo Buontalenti, over an existing structure.

In the 19th century, Leopold II, Grand Duke of Tuscany, converted the villa into a mental asylum. Later, in 1886, it was repurposed as a jail for women and minors, and subsequently became a facility for those deemed mentally ill.

During the 17th century, the villa and its grounds were used by Francesco Redi for anatomical studies on leprosy. Meanwhile, Andrea Scacciati and Bartolomeo Bimbi created paintings of flora and fauna for Grand Duke Cosimo III de' Medici.

Although the villa remained a psychiatric institution for many years, guided visits were permitted in certain areas.

== See also ==
- Medici villas
