= Mantovan =

Mantovan is an Italian surname, meaning someone from Mantua. For instance, Dante's Divine Comedy describes both Virgil and Sordello as being Mantovan.

Notable people with the surname include:

- Carlotta Mantovan (born 1982), Italian journalist
- Elena Mantovan, Italian-American mathematician
- Mario Mantovan (born 1965), Italian bicycle racer

== See also ==
- Mantovani (surname)
- Mantovano
