= Jacopo Ligozzi =

Italian painter

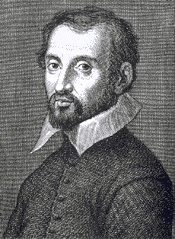
- Born: 1547; Verona, Republic of Venice
- Died: 1627 (aged 79–80); Florence, Grand Duchy of Tuscany
- Known for: Painting
- Movement: Mannerism

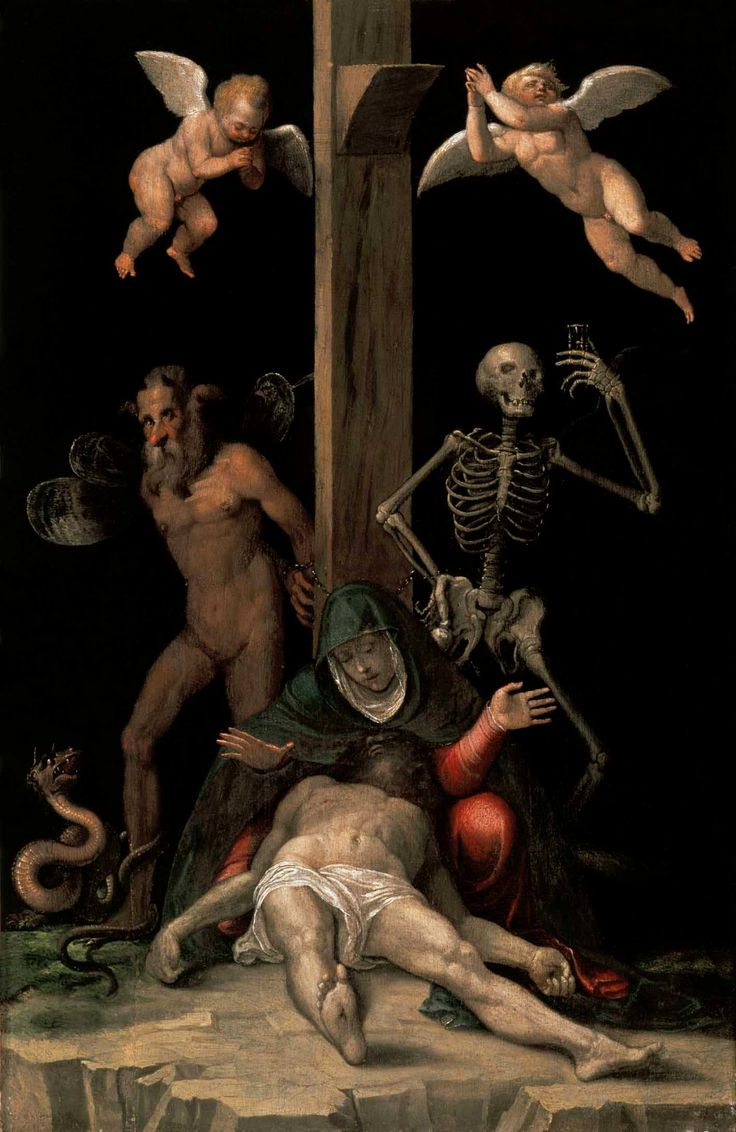
The Allegory of the Redemption; Madrid, Prado Museum.

Jacopo Ligozzi (1547–1627) was an Italian painter, illustrator, designer, and miniaturist. His art can be categorized as late-Renaissance and Mannerist styles.

== Biography ==
Born in Verona, he was the son of the artist Giovanni Ermano Ligozzi, and part of a large family of painters and artisans. After a time in the Habsburg court in Vienna, where he displayed drawings of animal and botanical specimens, he was invited to come to Florence and became one of the court artists for the Medici.

Upon the death of Giorgio Vasari in 1574, he became head of the Accademia e Compagnia delle Arti del Disegno, the officially patronized guild of artists, which was often called to advise on diverse projects. He served Francesco I, Ferdinando I, Cosimo II and Ferdinando II, Grand Dukes of Tuscany. For the Medici, he adorned the Grotto of Thetys in the Colossus of the Apennine. He was named director of the grand-ducal Galleria dei Lavori, a workshop providing designs for artworks made mainly for export: embroidered textiles and for the newly popular medium of pietre dure, mosaics of semiprecious stones and colored marbles.

He painted frescoes depicting episodes from the life of St. Francis of Assisi for the cloister of the Ognissanti. He also painted a canvas of St. Raymond resuscitating a Child for Santa Maria Novella and Martyrdom of St. Dorothea for the church of the Conventuali at Pescia. His altarpieces depict crowds in staged positions, robbed of emotion; the paintings breathe an academic staleness that is typical of Florentine painting of the age.

In his many pen-and-wash drawings featuring religious, mythological, or heraldic images, Ligozzi demonstrated a greater originality. He is known best for his depictions of fauna and flora, which reflect the nascent scientific pursuits of the Medici. His botanically correct depictions of plants can even include exquisitely observed root systems. Among his accurate depictions of animals is A Marmot with a Branch of Plums (1605). Ligozzi was commissioned to create some of the depictions found in the encyclopedic visual catalogue of the plant collections of Bolognese Ulisse Aldrovandi (kept in the Gabinetto Disegni e Stampe of the Uffizi Gallery). He can be described as the Audubon of late Renaissance Florence. He is also credited with bringing the lusher color-palette of Verona to Florence.

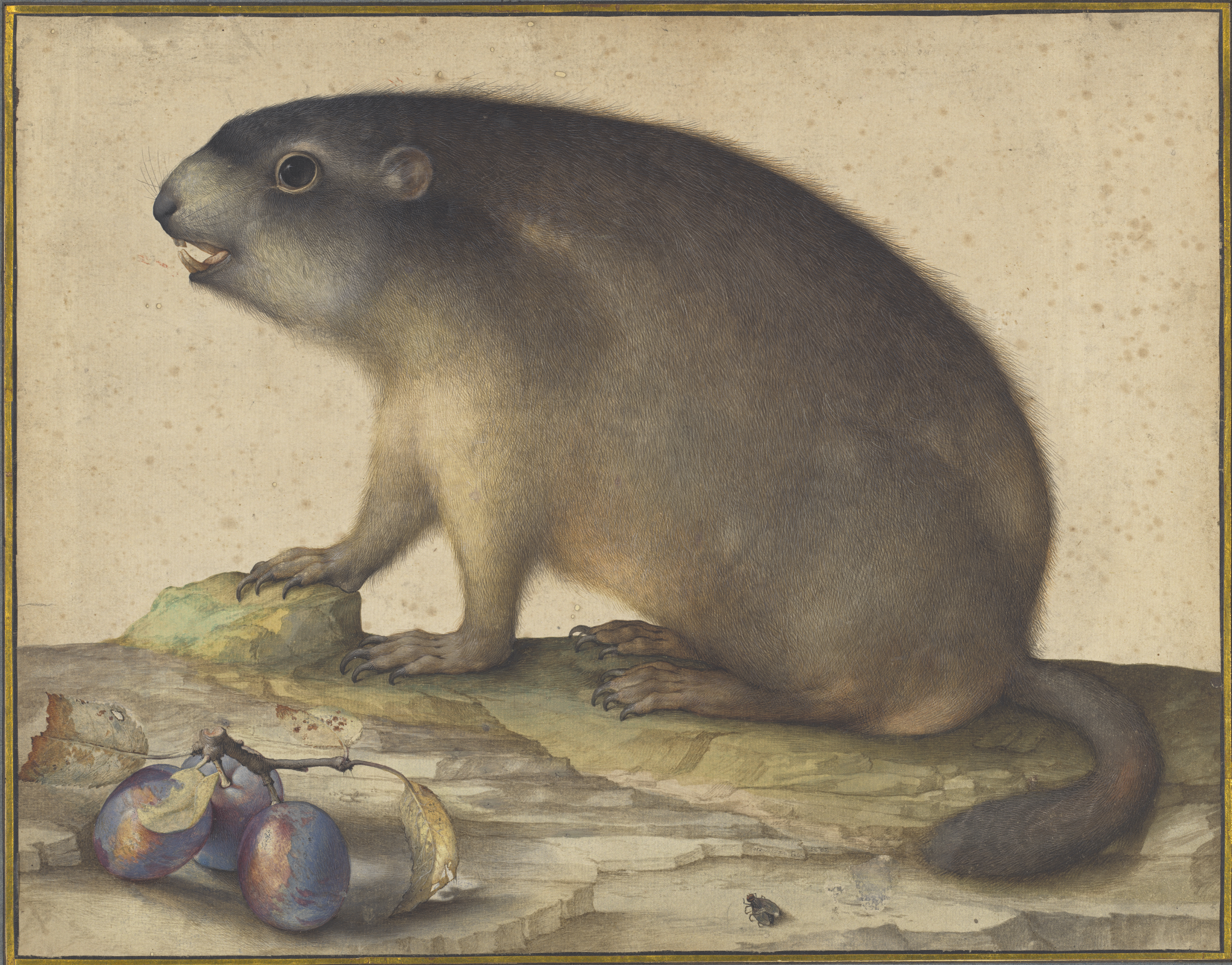
A Marmot with a Branch of Plums, 1605, now in the US National Gallery of Art (NGA 139309)

Ligozzi was influential among some subsequent Florentines including Bartolomeo Bimbi. Among his pupils were Donato Mascagni, known as Frate Arsenio, and Mario Balassi. Ligozzi's nephew Bartolommeo Ligozzi was also a painter. In Florence, he worked on some projects with Bernardino Poccetti. Both Agostino Carracci and Andrea Andreani engraved some of his works. He died in Florence.

== Sources ==
- John Seabrook, "Annals of Agriculture: Renaissance Pears", The New Yorker, September 5, 2005, p. 105.
- Getty Center Biography
- National Gallery Art exhibition titled The Flowering of Florence: Botanical art for the Medici
- Tomasi, Lucia Tongiorgi (1993). I ritratti di piante di Iacopo Ligozzi. Pisa: Pacini. ISBN 978-88-7781-079-3.
