= Giovanni Stanchi =

Italian painter

- Born: 1608; Rome
- Died: 1672 (aged 63–64)

Giovanni Stanchi (1608–1672) was an Italian still life painter. He was from Rome which was then part of the Papal States. In 1660, he was commissioned by Cardinal Flavio Chigi to decorate a gallery with flower and fruit still lifes.

One of his paintings has been noted for depicting watermelons distinct from modern ones, as they looked prior to selective breeding.

He died in 1672 aged 63 or 64.
