= Giuliano Periccioli =

Giuliano Periccioli (active 1639–1649) was an Italian engraver and cartographer.

He is said to have been born in Siena, but notes indicate he was hired by Charles I, King of England, to draw scenes from the Levant, and he traveled to England, after having been to Constantinople, Candia, Rhodes, Alexandria, Sicily and Spain. Prince Rupert of the Rhine brought him to the Siege of Breda. He then went to France, and the King of England, having recalled him, tried to send him to Italy in 1639. He then entered the service of Mattias de' Medici, Prince of Tuscany, who procured for him the Grand Duke, where he engraved various events. Some of the drawings in plates of the book Arcano del mare del duca di Nortumbria, whose nautical charts were drawn up by Lucas Holstenius are attributed to Periccioli. Jacques Callot is said to engraved after one of his designs.
