= Giovanni Ermano Ligozzi =

Italian painter

Giovanni Ermano Ligozzi (16th century) was an Italian painter a native of Verona, flourished about 1570. By some he is related to Jacopo Ligozzi. In the Church of the Apostles at Verona is a picture by him entitled The Name of Jesus (1573) and a fresco over the main door of the church of Santi Nazaro e Celso.
