= Bartolommeo Ligozzi =

Italian painter

- Born: Verona, Italy
- Years active: fl. c. 1620
- Known for: Still-life painting (flowers, fruits)
- Movement: Baroque
- Relatives: Jacopo Ligozzi (uncle)

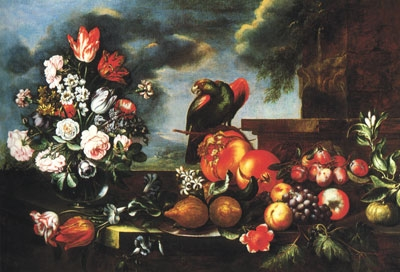
Flowers, Fruit and a Parrot by Bartolommeo Ligozzi, 1688

Bartolommeo Ligozzi was a 17th-century Italian painter who specialized in still-life paintings of flowers and genre subjects. He was the nephew of Jacopo Ligozzi. Born in Verona, Ligozzi flourished at Florence around the year 1620. He died at the age of 76.

== Sources ==
- Bryan, Michael (1889). Armstrong, Walter; Graves, Robert Edmund (eds.). Dictionary of Painters and Engravers, Biographical and Critical. Vol. II (L-Z). London: George Bell and Sons. p. 57.
