= Francesco Caldei =

Italian painter

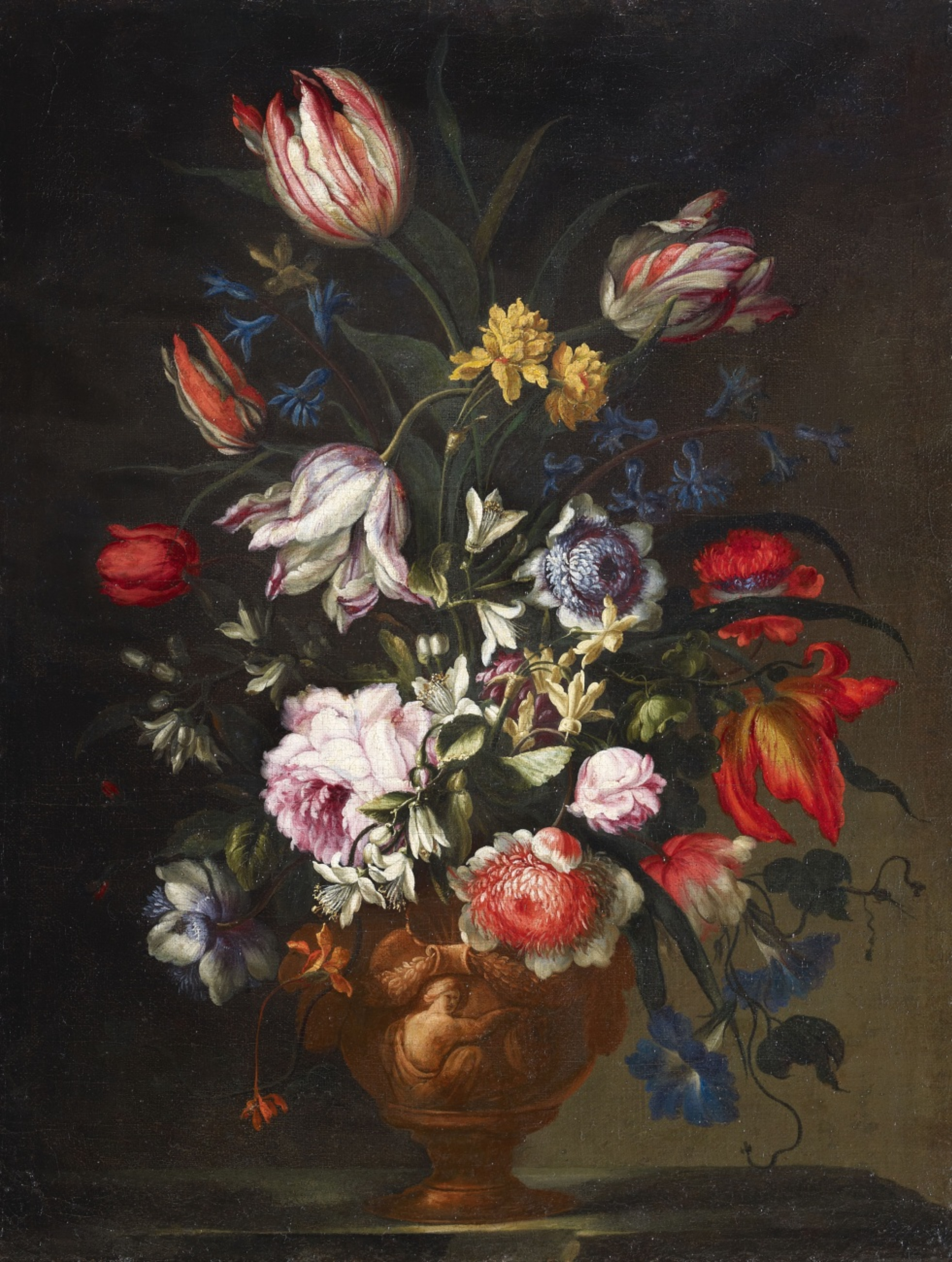
Flowers in an antique style relief vase

Francesco Caldei called Francesco Mantovano or Mantovani (1587/88 in Mantua – 22 May 1674 in Venice) was an Italian painter, mainly known as a still-life painter of flowers, fruits, animals and musical instruments. He also collaborated on garland and allegorical paintings. He was an art valuer and may also have been active as an art dealer. He worked first in Rome and then for the rest of his career in Venice. Here, his flower pieces with their Roman flavour and the pleasantness of composition earned the artist considerable commercial success with the Venetian bourgeoisie.

== Life ==
Little is known about the early life of Caldei. Only recent scholarship has identified that the artist referred to in contemporary sources as 'Francesco Mantovano' was in fact properly called 'Francesco Caldei'. From contemporary records, it has been deduced that he was born in the year 1587–88. His secondary name, 'Mantovano', means 'from Mantua', which indicates that he was originally from the city of Mantua. He is believed to have apprenticed in Mantua in the period from 1600 to 1609. The presence of Caldei in Mantua is documented in a letter sent by Marco Boschini to Leopoldo de' Medici, which states that Caldei had authenticated a portrait of Frans Pourbus the Younger whom Caldei had testified to having known and frequented in Mantua.

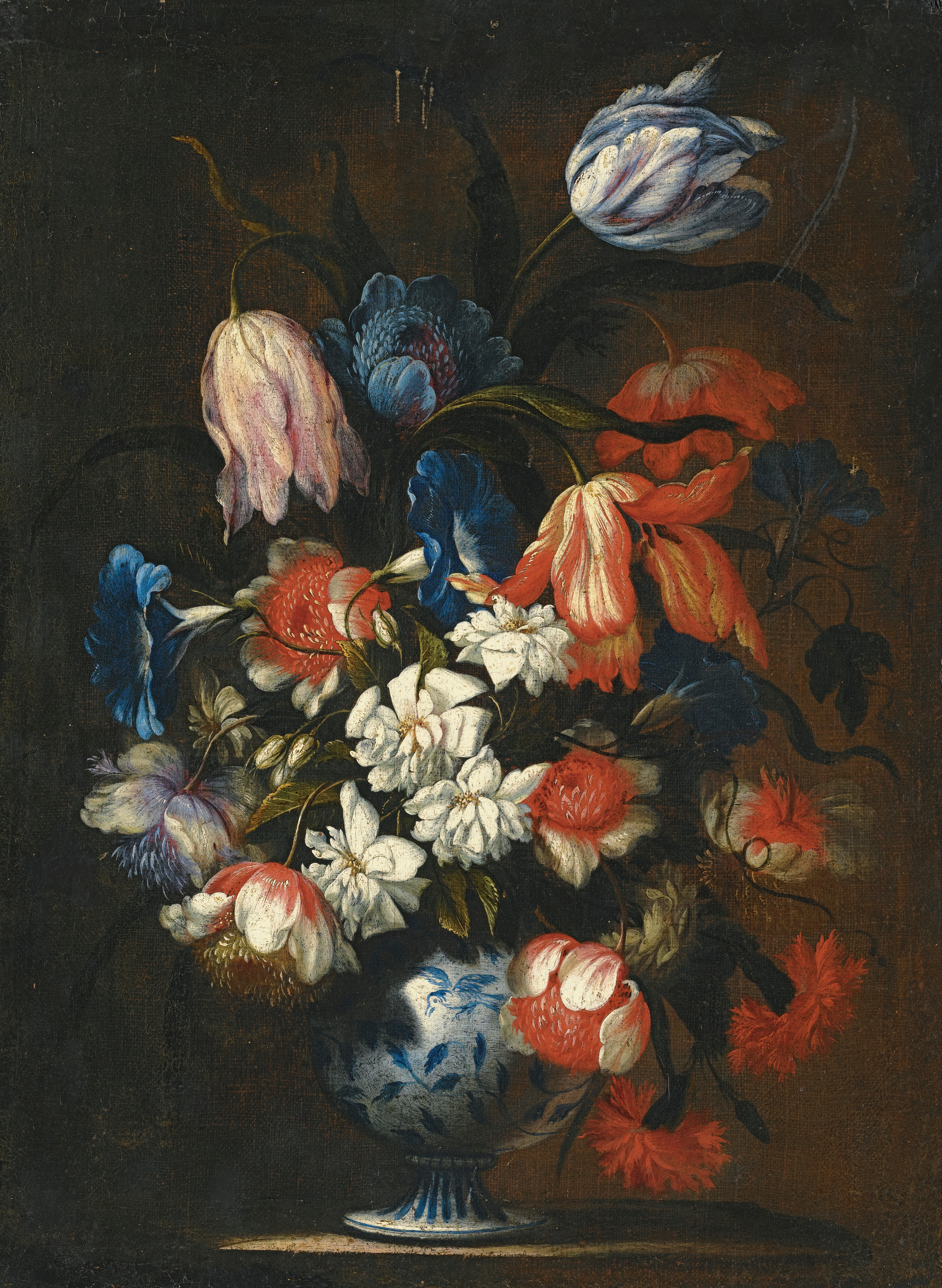
Still life with tulips, carnations and other flowers in a blue and white porcelain vase

In 1613, the record of the souls of the parish of Santa Maria del Popolo in Rome notes that there was a painter living with four other persons in the house of Claudio Napoli. It is believed that this is a reference to Bartolomeo Manfredi and his cohabitants, including Francesco Caldei. Caldei is mentioned as a boy or servant of Manfredi. In 1615, the record of the souls of the parish of San Lorenzo in Lucina in Rome, a "Francesco Caldeo" is referred to as a 'servant' of Bartolomeo Manfredi and as still living with his master. In 1625, the records of the souls of the parish of San Eustachio in Rome recorded a "Francesco Mantuano Pittore" (Francesco from Mantua, painter), living together with other persons in a house. He had probably lived there for some time.

In the second half of 1625, Caldei moved from Rome to Venice. In the same period, the Flemish painter Nicolas Régnier and the German painter Joseph Heintz the Younger also moved to Venice. Caldei would remain close to these two painters for the rest of his life. He made bequests to them in his first testament of 1663. He also maintained a close relationship with Régnier's son-in-law, the Flemish painter Daniel van den Dyck, who later became the court painter of the Dukes of Mantua. Caldei is recorded in Venetian records from 1636 onwards. In the 1642 census of the Provveditori alla Sanità, a Francesco Mantovano is recorded as living with a boy, perhaps an apprentice, and a woman. On 2 December 1648, the Gonzaga resident in Venice, Francesco Framberti, sent four paintings of fruits to the Duke of Mantua, specifying that they had been painted by a Mantuan painter who had been artistically trained in Rome. It is believed that this artist was Caldei.

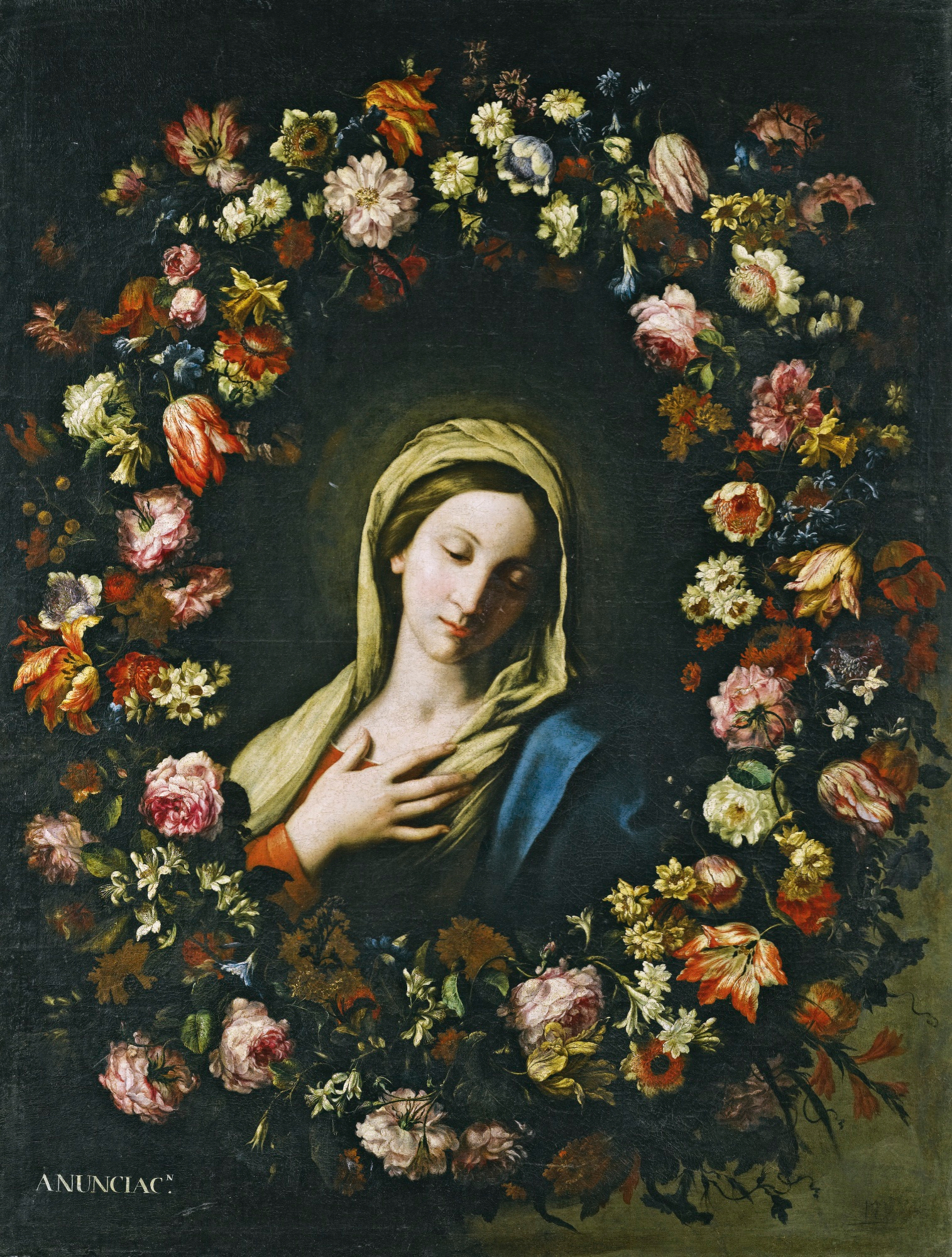
Flower garland surrounding the Virgin Annunciate

In July 1651, Caldei married Giovanna de Poli, a widow. In the wedding contract, dated 6 July 1657, the amount of the dowry and its destination at the death of her husband were specified. On 21 November 1660, his wife wrote her will. It is not clear when she died. The biographer Marco Boschini dedicated some quatrains to Francesco Mantovano and inserted a woodcut derived from one of his paintings in a gallery of famous Venetian painters in his La carta del navegar pitoresco, which was published in 1660.

In 1661, Caldei is cited as an expert and intermediary for the sale of statues owned by the nobleman Pietro Marcello to Charles II, Duke of Mantua and Montferrat. In 1663, the painter was included in the Fifth Catalogue of painters of name who currently live in Venice, which Giustiniano Martinioni added to his Venetia città nobilissima et singolare descritta in XIII libri da M. Francesco Sansovino. On 21 November 1663, he made a will. From the will, it is clear that his first wife had died and that he had not yet remarried. In 1665, the artist was hired as assessor of the inventory of Giuseppe Martis' estate. In 1672, he was again mentioned in the same role, this time for the estate of the painter Giovan Andrea Fumiani.

On 19 May 1674, Caldei wrote his second will. From the deed, it is clear that he had remarried. He died on 22 May 1674 in Venice.

== Work ==
Caldei is mainly known as a still-life painter of flowers, fruits, animals and musical instruments. He also collaborated with other artists on garland paintings and allegorical paintings.

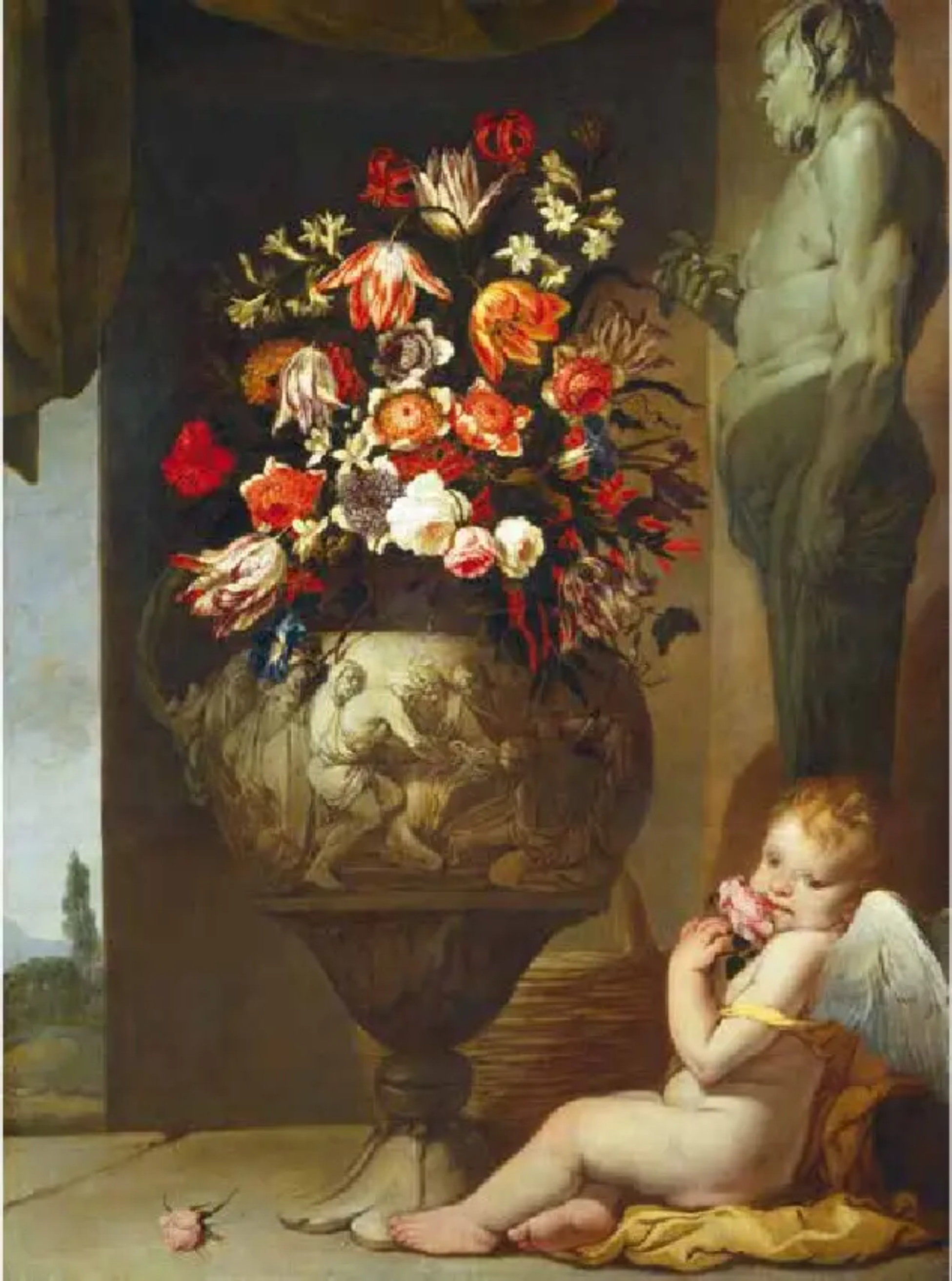
Smell

Caldei did not sign his paintings. His oeuvre has been reconstituted on the basis of four still lifes in the collection of the Pinacoteca dell'Accademia a Palazzo Roverella in Rovigo. His work is clearly impacted by the Roman artistic milieu of his time. His master, Bartolomeo Manfredi, must have taught him the naturalism that Caravaggio had introduced into Roman art. His style of flower painting was likely influenced by his study of the vases with flowers which he had seen in the workshop of Tommaso Salini in Rome. His flower pieces are close to those of Mario Nuzzi, who was a pupil of Salini. In the past, it was believed that Caldei was a pupil of Nuzzi, but this thesis has now been disproved as Caldei was in fact older than Nuzzi and already a trained painter at the time Nuzzi arrived in Rome. Salini inspired Caldei to use elegant vases decorated with figures and surmounted by spectacular bouquets. Flemish innovations such as flying butterflies and dragonflies were also influential on Caldei.

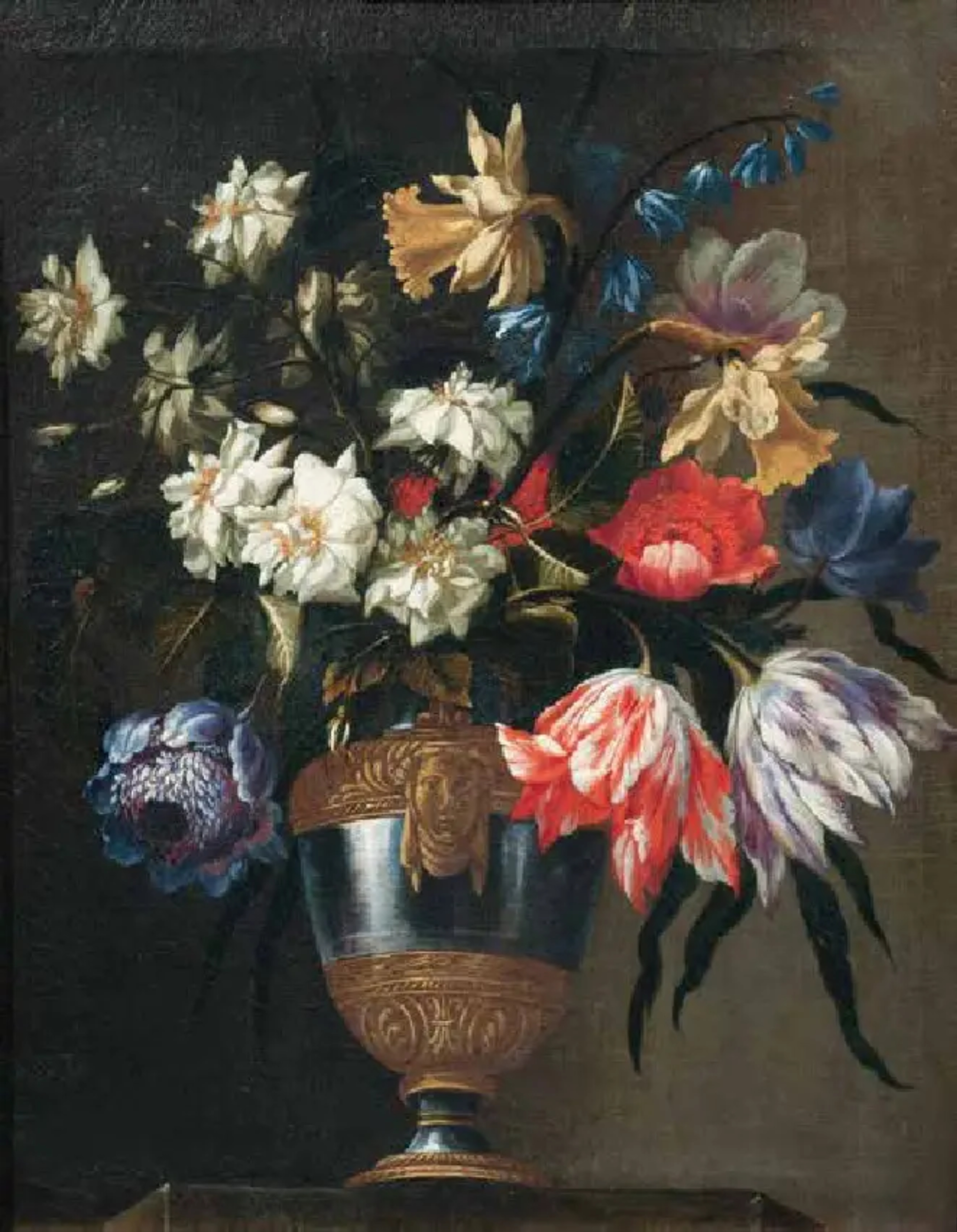
Flowers in a vase with a sculpted mask

Although he was described as a painter of fruits, animals and musical instruments, no works in those genres have been attributed to him to date. It is believed that he collaborated with other painters such as Joseph Heintz the Younger and Giulio Carpioni and added still life elements or animals in their compositions. An example is the pair of allegories of Touch and Smell (private collection) in which Caldei painted the flowers in an urn, and Giulio Carpioni painted the rest.

Some of his collaborations involved the creation of so-called 'garland paintings'. Garland paintings were first painted in the early 17th century in Antwerp by Jan Brueghel the Elder and subsequently practised by leading Flemish still life painters, such as Daniel Seghers. Paintings in this genre typically show a flower or, less frequently, a fruit garland around a devotional image or portrait. Abraham Brueghel, the grandson of Jan Brueghel the Elder, introduced the genre into Italy, where he worked for 40 years. An example of Caldei's efforts in this genre are a pair of garland paintings of flowers surrounding an image of the angel Gabriel and the Virgin Annunciate (Sotheby's, 10 April 2013 London lot 95). It has not been identified which artist painted the figures in the garlands, which are based on models by Guido Reni.

Caldei was also capable of reproducing other artists' models in his own compositions. A pair of canvases depicting a Still Life with Vase of Flowers in a Coastal Landscape Setting (Sotheby's, 7 July 2011 London lot 219) shows his good knowledge of Heintz' paintings. They depict in the foreground vases with flowers, birds on the ground and in flight, a butterfly, a snail and in the background a seascape and glimpses of coastal cities surrounded by mountains.
