= Bartolomeo Bimbi =

Florentine painter

- Moluccan cockatoo, 1716, Museum of Still Life, Villa di Poggio a Caiano
- Born: 15 May 1648; Settignano, Grand Duchy of Tuscany
- Died: 14 January 1729 (aged 80); Florence, Grand Duchy of Tuscany
- Known for: Painting
- Notable work: Still life painting
- Movement: Baroque

Bartolomeo Bimbi (15 May 1648 – 14 January 1729) was an Italian Baroque painter. He is most famous for his encyclopedic, scientific paintings of fruits and flowers cataloging the Medici botanical collections.

== Life and work ==
Born in Settignano on 15 May 1648, Bartolomeo Bimbi was the son of Nicolò. Around 1661, he entered the workshop of Lorenzo Lippi, where he remained until the death of the master (1665). He then became an apprentice for Onorio Marinari. After a trip to Rome as part of the retinue of Cardinal Leopoldo de' Medici, he began working for the Florentine court and aristocracy. Although his training made him suitable for figure painting, Bimbi is known almost exclusively for his activity as a painter of still life and portraits.

Bimbi worked primarily for the House of Medici. He was probably introduced to the Medici court by Filizio Pizzichi, a painter of natural history subjects, who worked for the naturalist Francesco Redi. His main patron was Cosimo III, who had a keen interest in botany and commissioned him to decorate the Villa Medicea L'Ambrogiana and the Villa Medicea della Topaia with still life paintings. Most of Bimbi's canvases of flora and fauna are now conserved in the Pitti Palace and the Museo di Storia Naturale di Firenze. Bimbi followed the tradition of Jacopo Ligozzi in documenting the botanical collections of the Medici with scientific precision and was in contact with prominent Florentine naturalists, such as Francesco Redi and Pier Antonio Micheli, who frequented the court of Cosimo III.

His flower paintings form a small part of his oeuvre yet perhaps best reveal his personality; they are touched with melancholy, in the manner of Willem van Aelst, whose works Bimbi may have seen in the Medici residences. His most important series of paintings, commissioned by the Medici from 1685 for the Villa Medicea L'Ambrogiana and the Villa Medicea della Topaia, are two compositions entitled Basket of Grapes, four entitled Basket of Citrus Fruits and other paintings featuring various specimens of cherries, plums, figs and peaches (all Florence, Palazzo Pitti). These large canvases are enclosed in frames decorated with accurately represented plant motifs; each displays a variety of fruits, many of which have since disappeared, all furnished with inscriptions giving the scientific names of the various specimens. A series of paintings of vegetables, which includes Beets, Spanish Thistle, Bean Plants and Truffle, all of extraordinary size (Florence, Museo Botanico dell'Universita), are each labelled with the date and place of discovery and often with the weight and dimensions of the subject. Similar information accompanies the Two-headed Calf and the Two-headed Lamb (Florence, Palazzo Pitti). Bimbi died in Florence on 14 January 1729, aged 80.

== Gallery ==
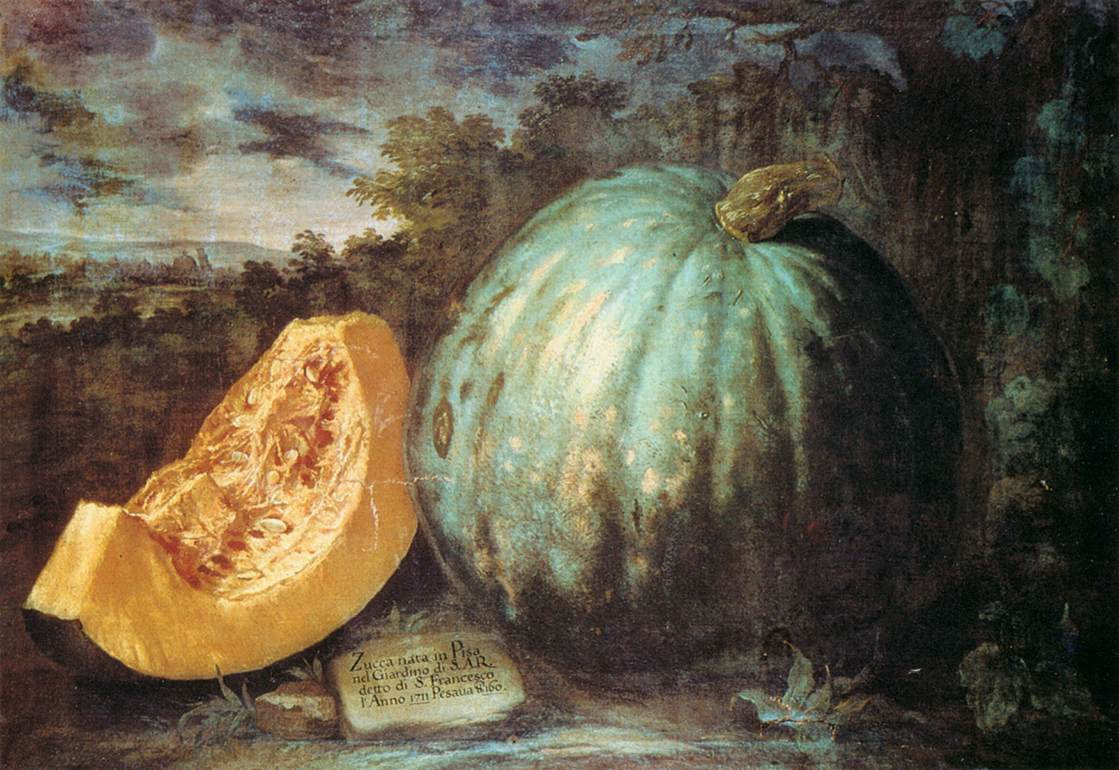
Squash from the Grand Ducal Garden at Pisa, 1711, Museo di Storia Naturale di Firenze

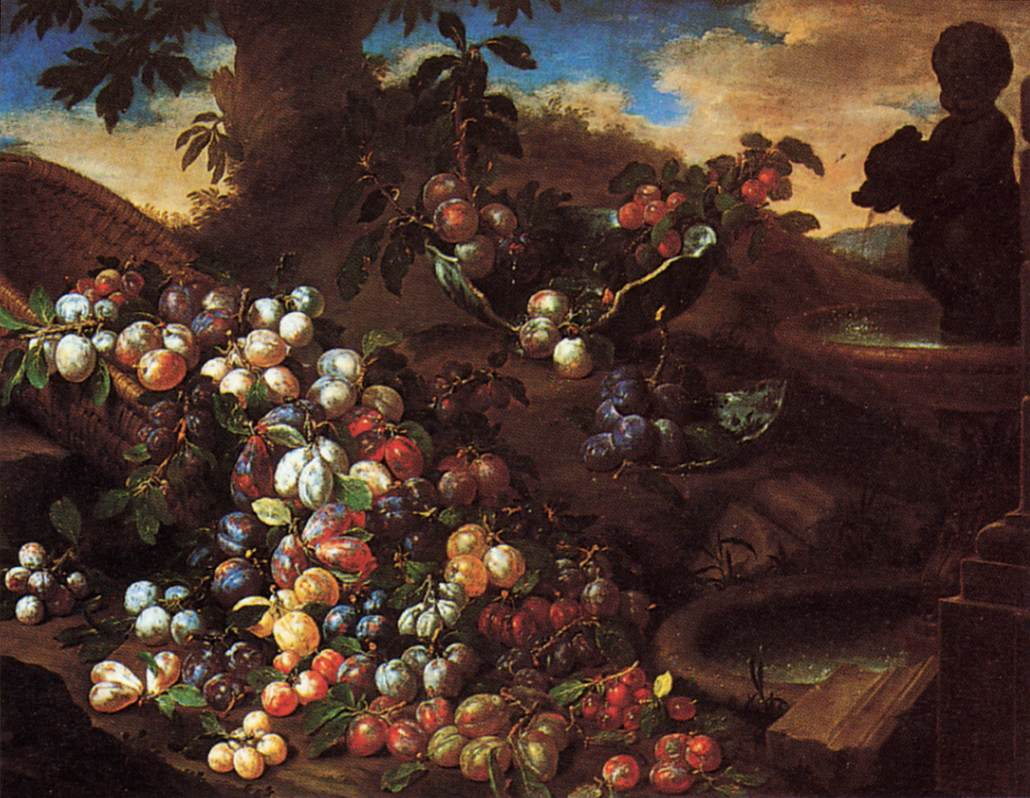
Plums, 1670s, Museum of Still Life, Villa di Poggio a Caiano

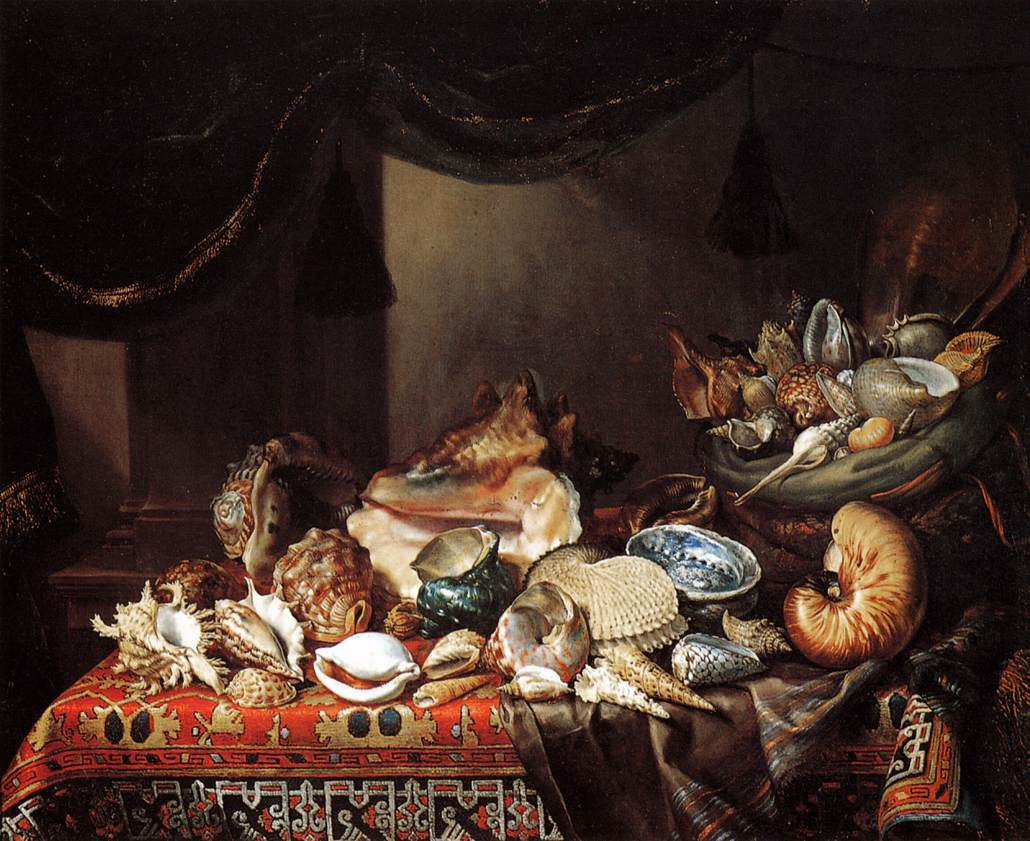
Still-life with Shells, 1670s, Palazzo Reale, Siena

Still-life with Mollusks and Corals, before 1725, priv. col.

Melons, 1694, Museo di Storia Naturale di Firenze

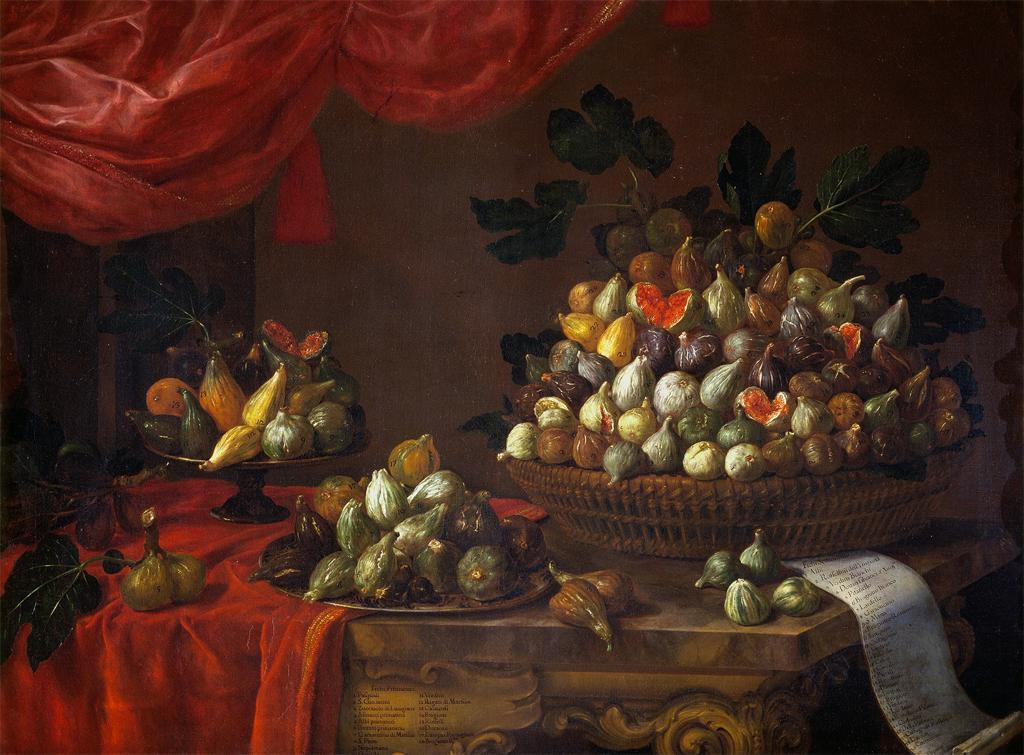
Still-life with Figs, 1696, Museum of Still Life, Villa di Poggio a Caiano

Sunflower (Helianthus annuus), 1721, Galleria Palatina, Palazzo Pitti, Florence

Citrus Fruits, 1715, Museum of Still Life, Villa di Poggio a Caiano

== Bibliography ==
- Trkulja, Silvia Meloni (1968). "BIMBI, Bartolomeo". Dizionario Biografico degli Italiani (in Italian). Vol. 10: Biagio–Boccaccio. Rome: Institute of the Italian Encyclopaedia. ISBN 978-88-12-00032-6.
- Lucia Tongiorgi Tomasi; Gretchen A. Hirschauer, eds. (2002). The flowering of Florence: botanical artfor the Medici (PDF). Washington, D.C.: National Gallery of Art.
