= 1900 in art =

The year 1900 in art involved some significant events and new works.

== Events ==
- April 14–November 12 – Exposition Universelle in Paris helps popularize Art Nouveau style. Alphonse Mucha decorates the Bosnia and Herzegovina Pavilion and collaborates on the Austria-Hungary one.
- F. Holland Day organizes an exhibition of the New School of American Photography at the Royal Photographic Society in London.
- The Wallace Collection in London opens to the public.
- The Zachęta art gallery in Warsaw is completed.
- Claude Monet stays in London and begins his Houses of Parliament series of paintings.
- Wilhelm von Debschitz and Hermann Obrist found the Lehr- und Versuchsatelier für angewandte und freikunst, an influential art school in Munich.

== Works ==
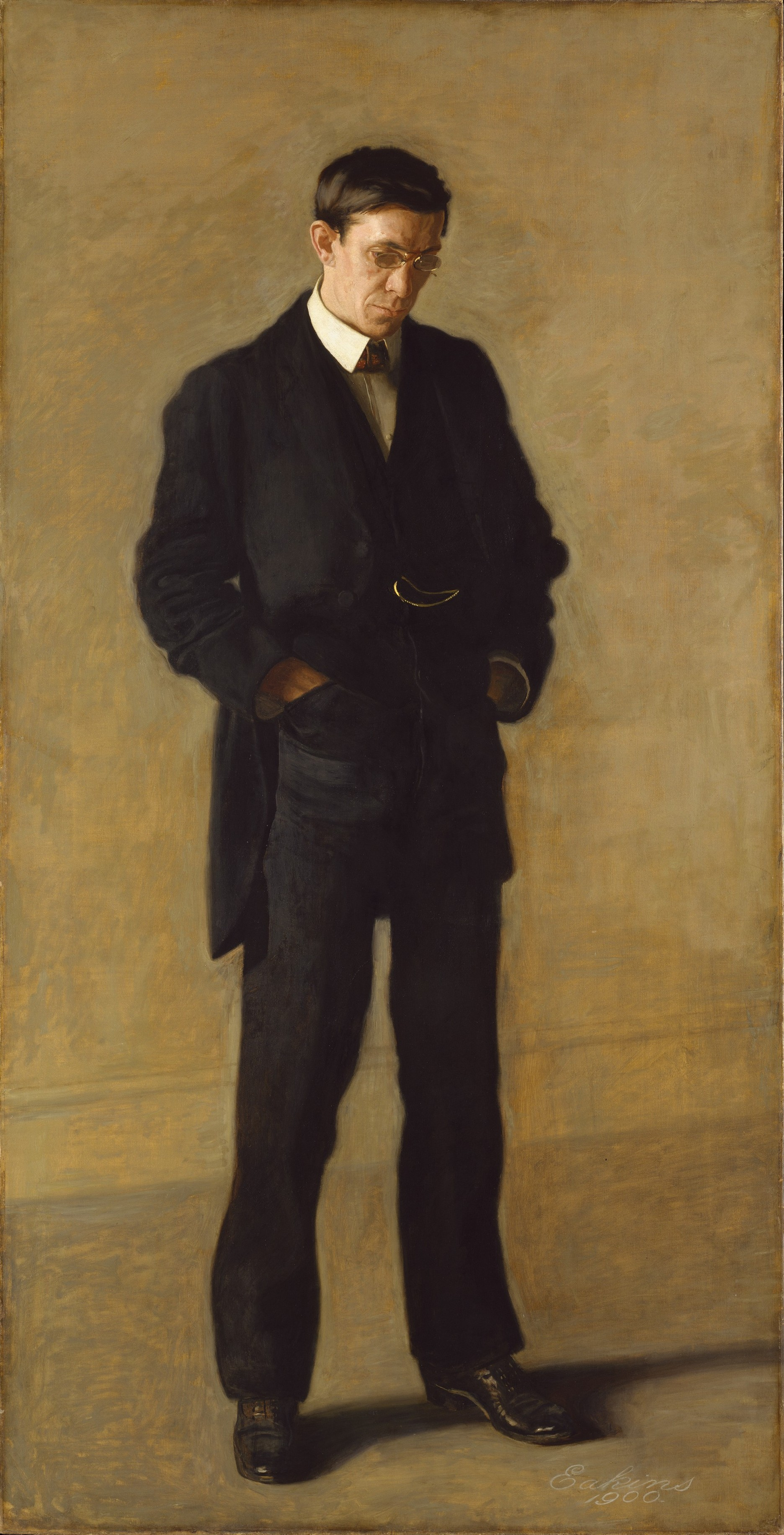
Eakins' The Thinker

- Mary Cassatt
  - Jules Being Dried by His Mother
  - Young Mother Sewing
- Frank Cadogan Cowper – Rapunzel
- Aurélia de Souza – Self-portrait
- Maurice de Vlaminck
  - Sur le zinc ("At the Bar")
  - L'homme a la pipe ("Man Smoking a Pipe")
- Adolphe Demange
  - La Duchesse d'Uzès travaillant à la statue monumentale de Jeanne d'Arc, dans l'atelier de Falguière
  - Place de la Concorde
- Maurice Denis – Homage to Cézanne
- Frank Dicksee – The Two Crowns
- Thomas Eakins
  - Portrait of Mary Adeline Williams (second version, Philadelphia Museum of Art)
  - The Thinker: Portrait of Louis N. Kenton (Metropolitan Museum of Art, New York)
- Stanhope Forbes – The Drinking Place
- Daniel Chester French and Edward Clark Potter – Equestrian statue of George Washington, Paris, France
- Florence Fuller – Inseparables
- J. W. Godward
  - Idleness
  - The Jewel Casket
  - The Toilet
- Vilhelm Hammershøi – Sunbeams
- Holman Hunt – The Light of the World (replica)
- Paja Jovanović – The Proclamation of Dušan's Law Codex
- Gustav Klimt - Attersee
- Henry Herbert La Thangue – The Watersplash
- Edmund Leighton – God Speed
- Maximilien Luce – Notre Dame de Paris
- Ambrose McEvoy – Bessborough Street, Pimlico (Tate)
- Henri Matisse
  - Notre-Dame (Tate)
  - Two self-portraits
- Edvard Munch
  - Golgotha
  - Red Virginia Creeper
- Emil Nolde – Wheat Field (approximate date)
- William Orpen – Herbert Everett (National Maritime Museum, Greenwich)
- Roland Hinton Perry – Thompson Elk Fountain (bronze, Portland, Oregon)
- Pablo Picasso
  - Le Blouse Romaine
  - Le Moulin de la Galette
- Camille Pissarro – Place du Carrousel, Paris
- Edward Poynter – Water Babies
- James Jebusa Shannon – The Flower Girl
- Philip Wilson Steer – Seated Nude, The Black Hat
- Fritz von Uhde – Woman, why weepest thou?
- Édouard Vuillard - Sans le Portique (completed)
- John William Waterhouse
  - Destiny
  - A Mermaid
  - The Siren

== Births ==
- January 5 – Yves Tanguy, French surrealist painter (d. 1955)
- January 8 – Serge Poliakoff, Russian-born painter (d. 1969)
- January 10 – Harry Kernoff, Irish painter (d. 1974)
- January 20 – Dorothy Annan, English painter, potter, and muralist (d. 1983)
- January 28 – Alice Neel, American portrait painter (d.1984)
- January 31 – Betty Parsons, American painter and gallerist (d. 1982)
- March 1 – Nano Reid, Irish painter (d. 1981)
- March 10 – Corrado Parducci, Italian-American architectural sculptor (d. 1981)
- March 13 – Andrée Bosquet, Belgian painter (d. 1980)
- April 13 – Pierre Molinier, French painter and photographer (d. 1976)
- April 20 – Jacques Adnet, French modernist designer, architect and interior designer (d. 1984)
- June 13 – Pierre Matisse, French-born gallerist, son of Henri Matisse (d. 1989)
- June 22 – Oskar Fischinger, German-American abstract animator, filmmaker and painter (d. 1967)
- June 26
  - František Muzika, Czech avant-garde painter (d. 1974)
  - Jo Spier, Dutch artist and illustrator (d. 1978)
- July 19 – Arno Breker, German sculptor (d. 1991)
- August 12 – Ronald Moody, Jamaican-born woodcarver (d. 1984)
- August 15 – Jack Tworkov, American abstract expressionist painter (d. 1982)
- August 23 – Louise Nevelson, Ukrainian-born American artist (d. 1988)
- September 19 – Ong Schan Tchow, Chinese artist (d. 1945)
- October 1 – Živko Stojsavljević, Serbian painter (d. 1978)
- October 14 – Roland Penrose, English surrealist painter and art collector (d. 1984)
- October 16
  - Edward Ardizzone, British writer and illustrator (d. 1979)
  - Primo Conti, Italian Futurist artist (d. 1988)
- October 17 – C. C. van Asch van Wijck, Dutch artist and sculptor (d. 1932)
- November 20 – Chester Gould, American cartoonist (d. 1985)
- date unknown
  - Francesco Di Cocco, Italian painter (d. 1989)
  - Guan Liang, Chinese painter (d. 1986)
  - Grace Morley, American curator (d. 1985)
  - Fannie Nampeyo, American Hopi potter and ceramic artist (d. 1987)
  - Tanasko Milovich, Serbian painter (d. 1964)

== Deaths ==
- January 20 – John Ruskin, English art critic (b. 1819)
- April 7 – Frederic Edwin Church, American landscape painter (b. 1826)
- April 20 – Alexandre Falguière, French painter and sculptor (b. 1831)
- May 5 – Ivan Aivazovsky, Russian seascape painter (b. 1817)
- July 2 – Thomas Farrell, Irish sculptor (b. 1827)
- August 4 – Isaac Levitan, Russian landscape painter (b. 1860)
- August 17 – Thomas Faed, Scottish genre painter (b. 1826)
- October 27 – William Anderson, English collector of Japanese art (b. 1842)
- November 29 – Méry Laurent, French muse and model to Édouard Manet (b. 1849)
