= Paul Fordyce Maitland =

British impressionist painter (1863-1909)

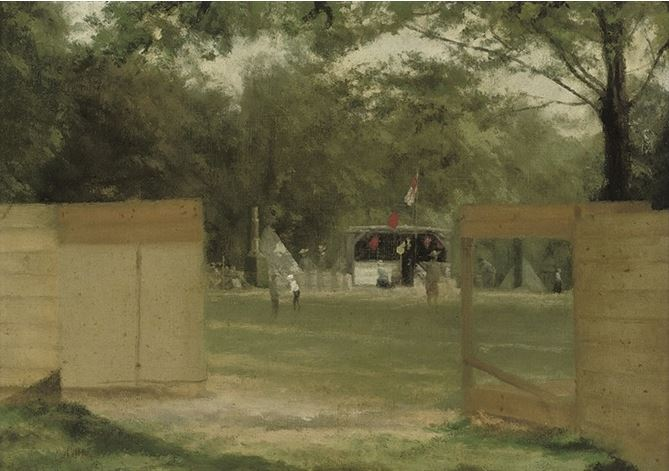
Hyde Park

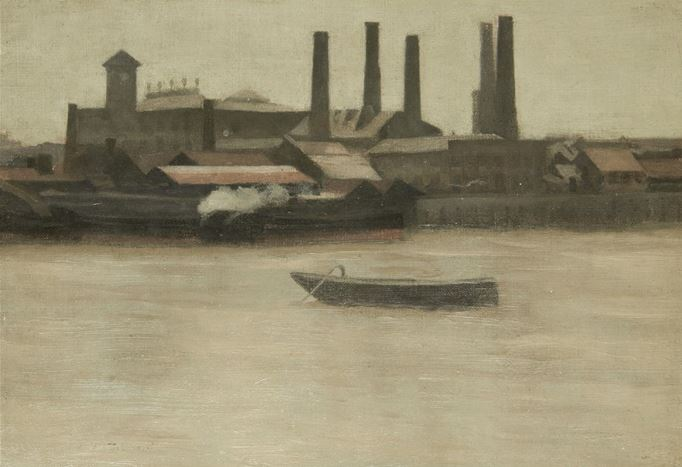
Battersea, Mills and Barges

Paul Fordyce Maitland (London 1863 – 13 May 1909 Shottermill, Surrey) was a British painter; one of the first Impressionists there. Most of his works are landscapes and urban scenes in and around Chelsea.

== Life and work ==
He was born with a spinal deformity that often made him shy and reclusive. Nevertheless, he studied at the Royal College of Art and became a pupil of the French émigré painter, Theodore Roussel. It was through Roussel that he became acquainted with the circle of artists around James McNeill Whistler, known as the "London Impressionists"; a group that included Walter Sickert and Philip Steer. He was also introduced into the Royal Society of British Artists.

By 1888, he had become a member of the New English Art Club; joining with Sickert and Steer at their exhibitions. His paintings were also shown at the Royal Society's Suffolk Street Gallery, the Grafton Galleries, the Walker Art Gallery in Liverpool and the Royal Glasgow Institute of the Fine Arts. In 1889, he was privileged to be included in the exhibit at the Goupil Galleries in Paris that introduced English-style Impressionism to the French.

Despite the wide distribution his paintings received, his spinal condition made it difficult to move his canvases and easels, so he confined himself to painting in the immediate surroundings of his home in Chelsea; including Kensington Gardens, the Chelsea Embankment and views across the river to Battersea. He continued to paint there after the area had become industrialized and other artists had begun to abandon it. Whistler's influence is especially evident in those scenes.

He taught drawing in South Kensington. In 1893, he became an art examiner for the London Board of Education, a post he held until 1908.

His works can be found at the Tate Gallery, the Ashmolean Museum and the Southampton City Art Gallery.
