= Rose Pettigrew =

British artist's model to Pre-Raphaelite artists

Rose Amy Pettigrew
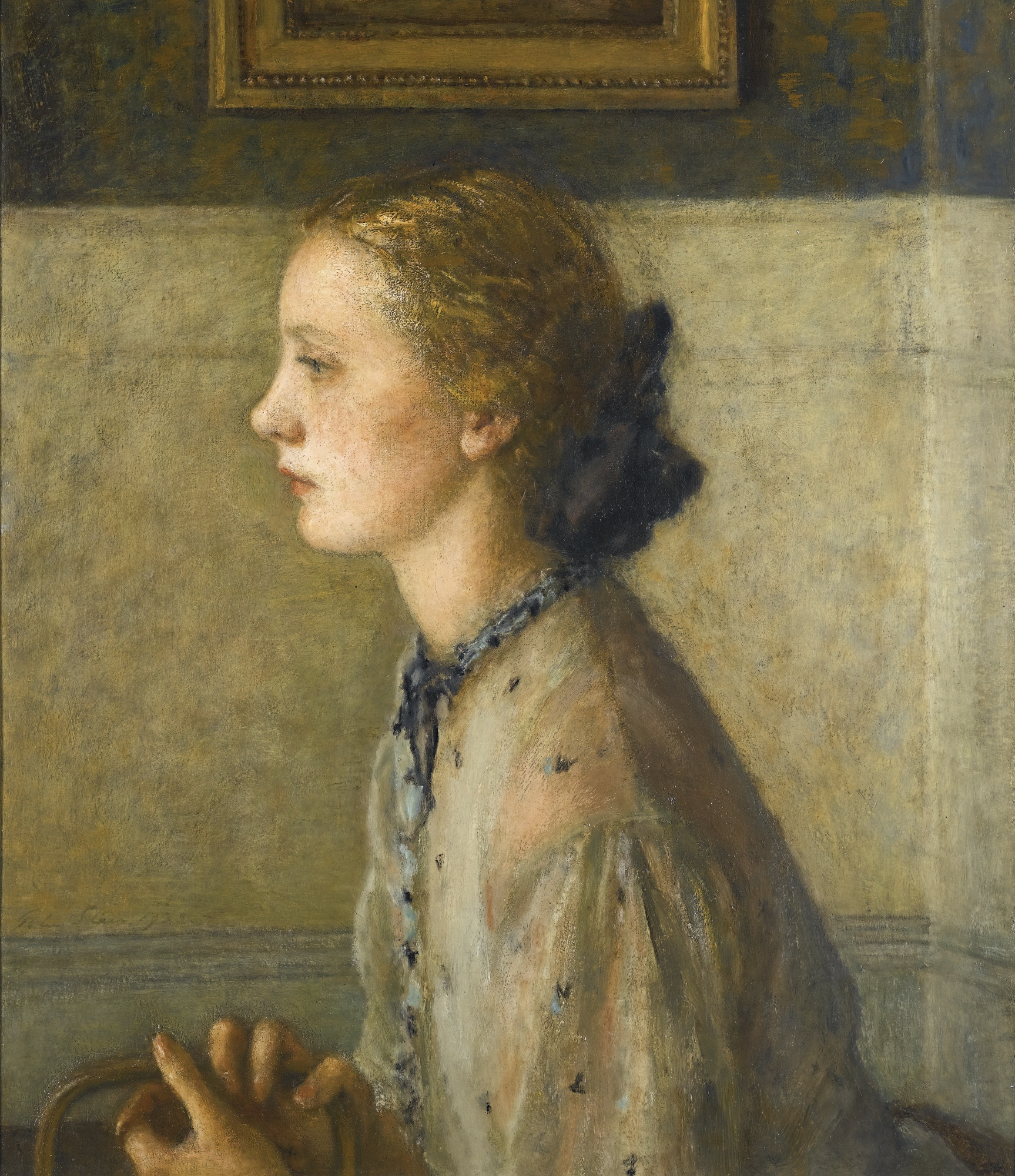
- Portrait of a Girl Seated in an Interior by Philip Wilson Steer
- Born: February 25, 1872
- Died: 1958 (aged 85–86)
- Other name: Rose Warner
- Occupation: Artist's model
- Years active: 1884 - 1896
- Known for: Subject in many Pre-Raphaelite artworks

Rose Pettigrew (Portsmouth, United Kingdom, February 25, 1872—1958) was a sought-after British model, sister of fellow models Hetty and Lily Pettigrew.

== Early life and family ==
Rose Amy Pettigrew was born in Portsmouth, UK in 1872, one of the 12 children of William and Harriet Pettigrew. She had 2 sisters and 9 brothers. Her father had worked as a schoolmaster but became unemployed and then worked for the Royal Navy as a cork cutter. Her father died suddenly in 1877 and her mother had to find ways to support the family. This included her skilled needlework but the family were in financial difficulties.

== Modelling career ==
One of her elder brothers, Charles, was a talented but financially poor artist. His art teacher suggested that Rose Pettigrew (then aged about 12) and her two elder sisters Hetty and Lily, should travel to London to work as artists' models because of the girls' Pre-Raphaelite appearance. Despite the likely reputational problems, they went to London. The three sisters travelled around the city themselves to seek work with artists.

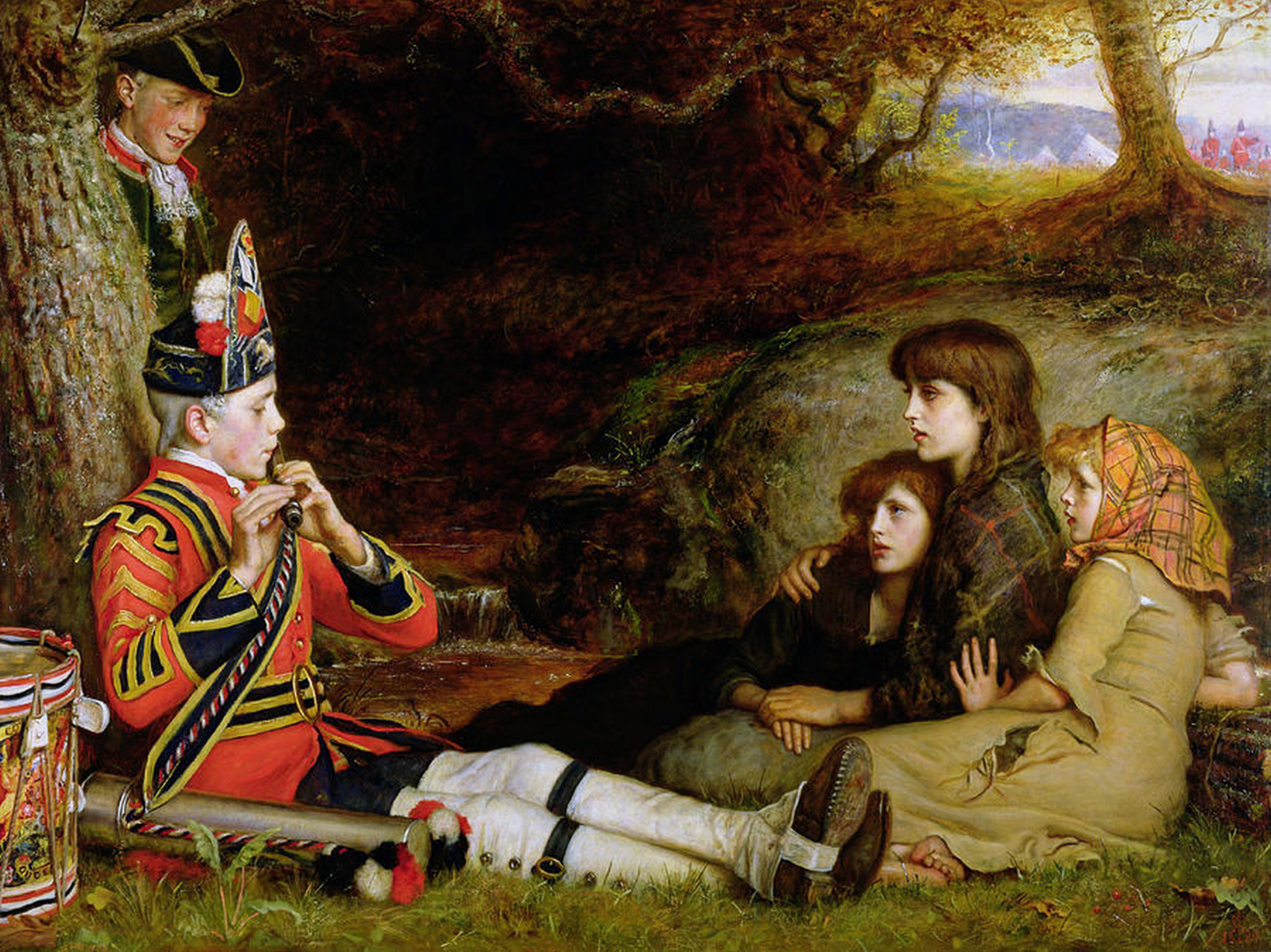
An Idyll of 1745 by John Everett Millais, 1884

Their first roles were as three Scottish peasant girls in John Everett Millais's 1884 painting An Idyll of 1745, for which they were each paid a sovereign (£1). She subsequently modelled for him again and other painters including James McNeill Whistler, William Holman Hunt, Theodore Roussel, John William Godward and Philip Wilson Steer.

== Personal life ==
Rose Pettigrew apparently fell in love with Philip Wilson Steer but this was not requited. On 6 July 1896, she married Harry Waldo Warner (1875–1945), a composer and viola player, and one of the founders of the London String Quartet and she retired from modeling. They had one child, Onslow Boyden Waldo Warner (1902-1988) who became well-known as a dance band player (saxophone and violin, with Peter Yorke and Fred Hartley), and from 1940 at the BBC as an arranger and composer of light music, under the name Ken Warner. She wrote her memoirs around 1947 which were published posthumously.
