= The Reading Girl =

Painting by Theodore Roussel

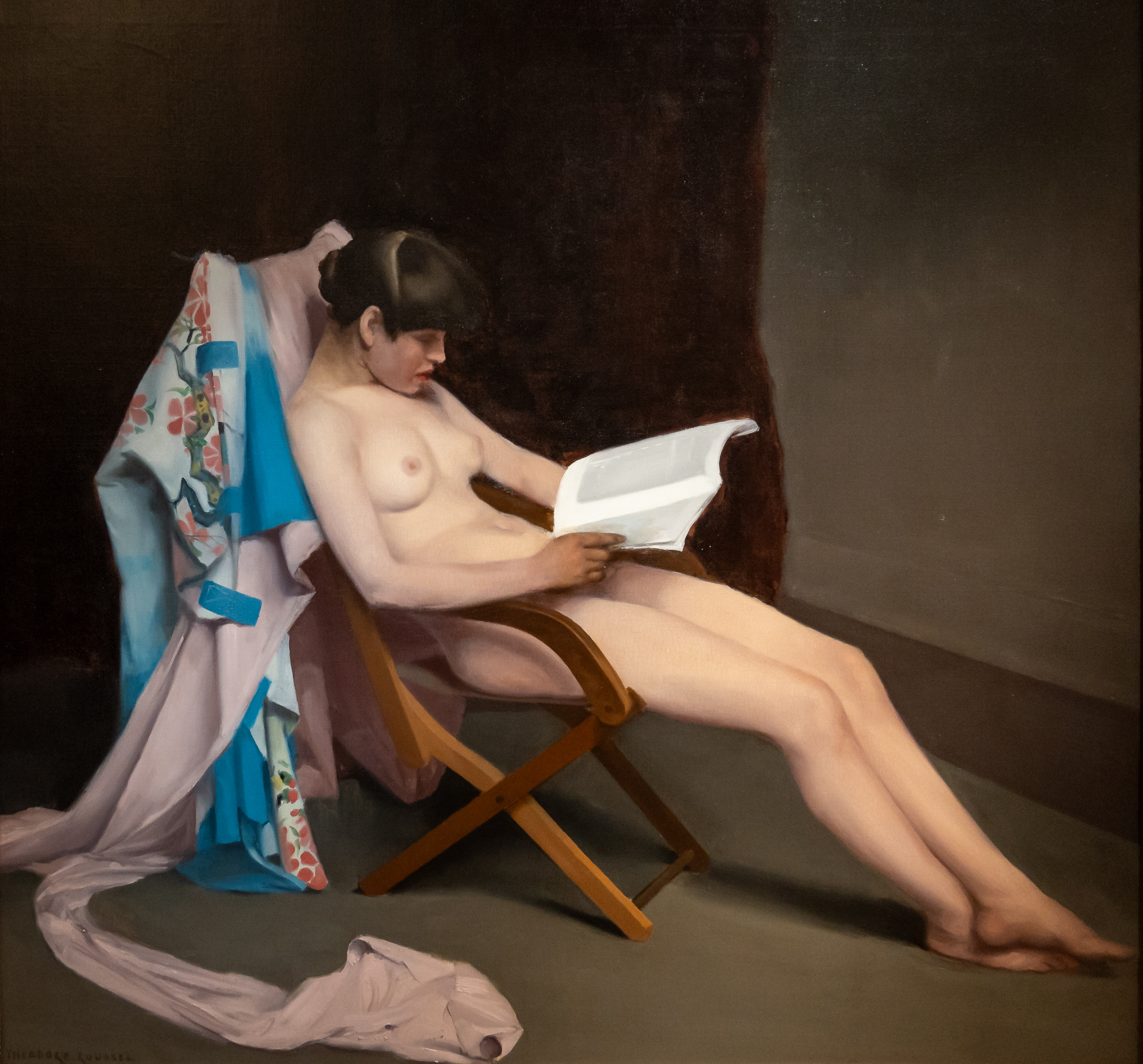
- Artist: Theodore Roussel
- Year: 1886-87
- Type: Oil on canvas, nude art
- Dimensions: 152.4 cm × 161.3 cm (60.0 in × 63.5 in)
- Location: Tate Britain; London

The Reading Girl is an 1887 oil painting by the French-British painter Theodore Roussel. A nude young woman is shown sitting in a wooden chair reading with a kimono slung over the back of the seat. The sitter was the model Hetty Pettigrew, who a few years earlier had appeared in Jacobite-themed painting An Idyll of 1745 by John Everett Millais.

It was one of two work's Roussel exhibited at the New English Art Club in 1887. This picture was described by Roussel's fellow artist William Orpen as the finest nude painting of the era. The painting is today in the collection of the Tate Britain, having been presented to the gallery in 1927.

== Bibliography ==
- Bollmann, Stefan. Women who Read are Dangerous. Merrell, 2008.
- McConkey, Kenneth. Impressionism in Britain. Yale University Press, 1995.
