= Richmond Castle =

Castle in North Yorkshire, England

Coordinates: 54.4017°N 1.7376°W

- Richmond, North Yorkshire, in England
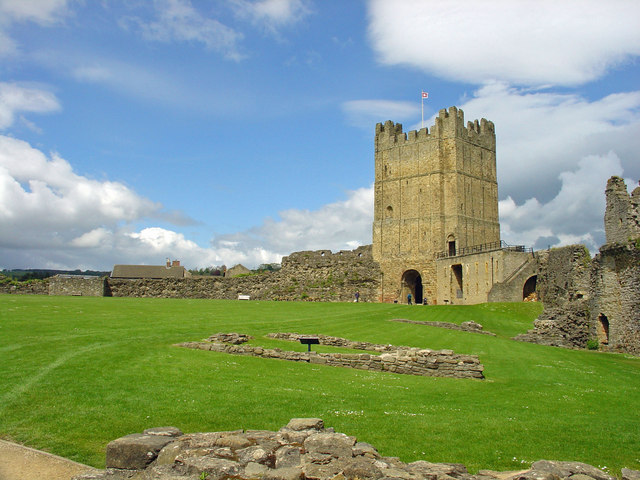
- The 12th-century keep

Site information
- Type: Norman enclosure castle with keep
- Owner: The Duke of Richmond and Gordon
- Operator: English Heritage
- Open to the public: Open to the public
- Condition: partial ruin

Location
- Location within North Yorkshire
- Grid reference: NZ171007

Site history
- Built: 1071
- Built by: Alan Rufus
- In use: Late 11th century – 14th century
- Materials: Bagshot Heath stone
- Events: First Barons' War

Scheduled monument
- Official name: Richmond Castle
- Reference no.: 1010627

Listed Building – Grade I
- Official name: Richmond Castle
- Designated: 1 August 1952; 74 years ago
- Reference no.: 1318398

Richmond Castle in Richmond, North Yorkshire, England, stands in a commanding position above the River Swale, close to the centre of the town of Richmond. It was originally called Riche Mount, 'the strong hill'. The castle was constructed by Alan Rufus from 1071 onwards following the Norman Conquest of England, and the Domesday Book of 1086 refers to 'a castlery' at Richmond.

In the 12th century, his great-nephew Conan expanded the castle and built the keep. Although it was derelict by 1540, it was restored centuries later. The property is the best-preserved early Norman castle in England and an important tourist attraction.

The building is Grade I listed and under the care of English Heritage.

== Layout ==
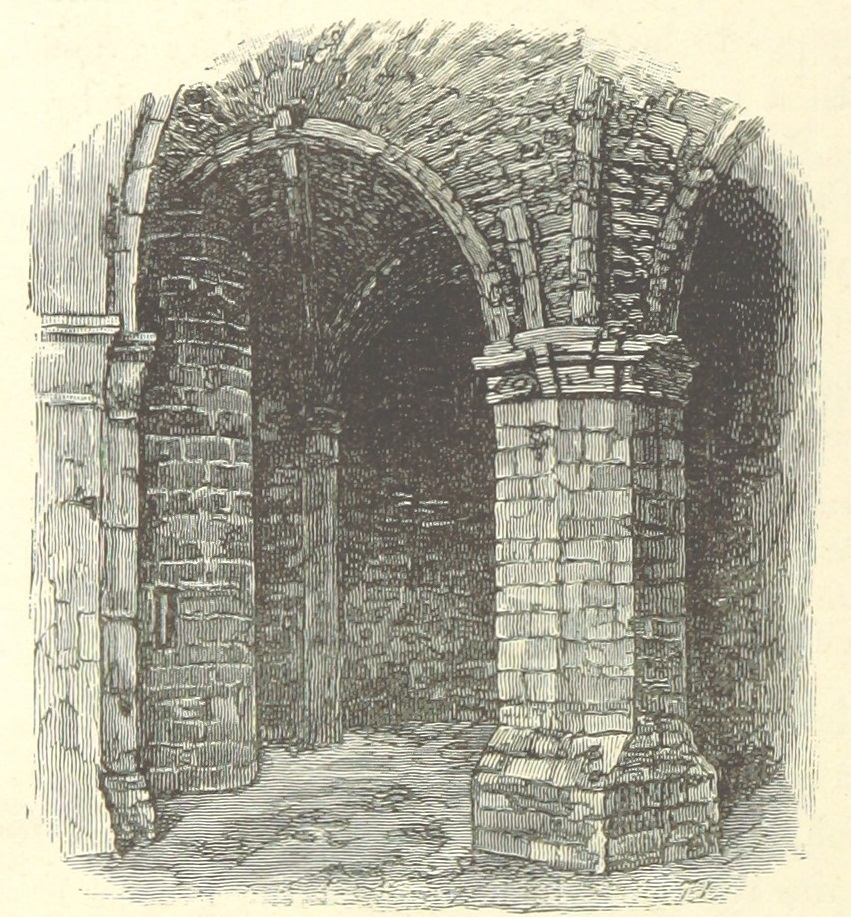
An illustration of the keep's basement

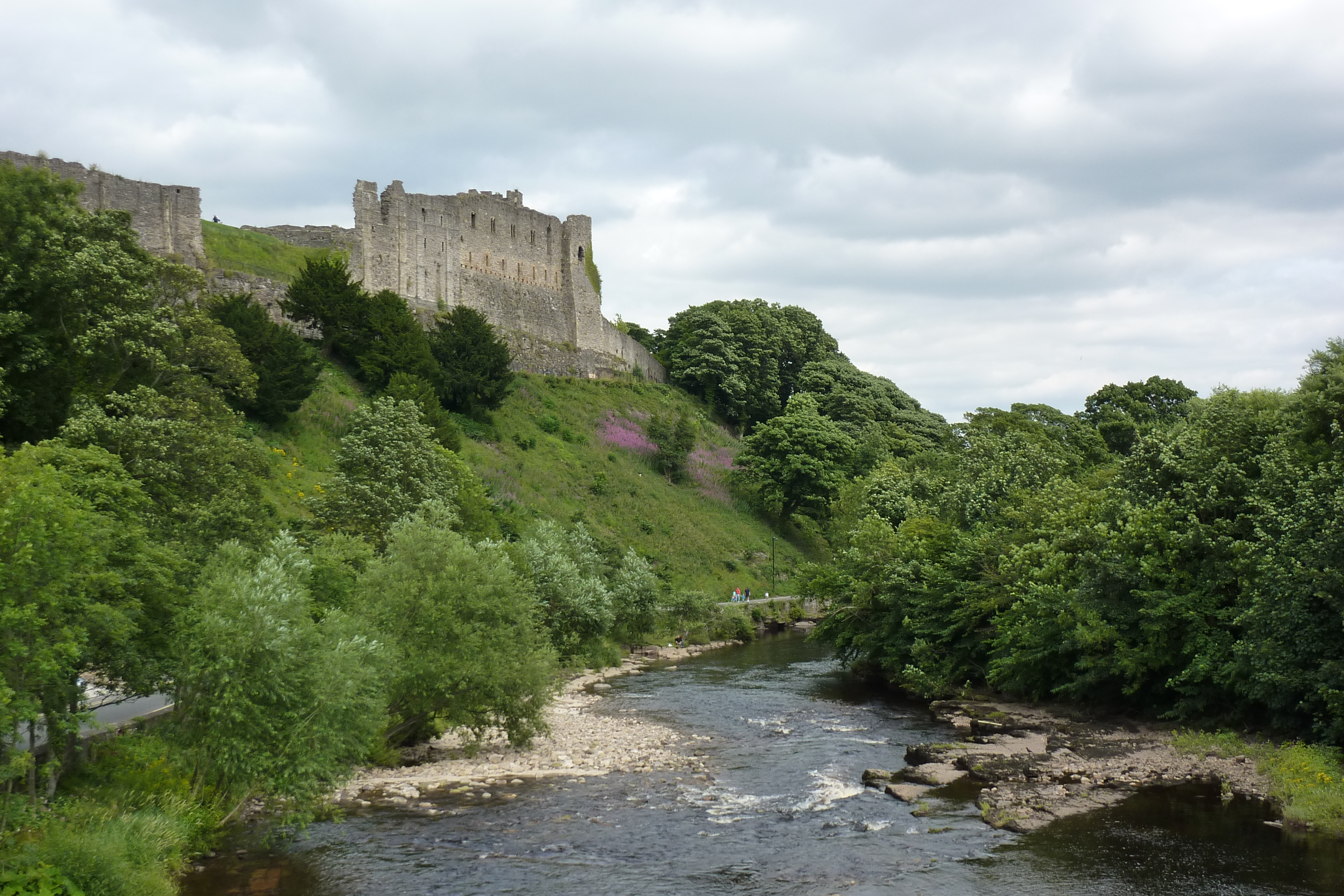
Richmond Castle from across the River Swale

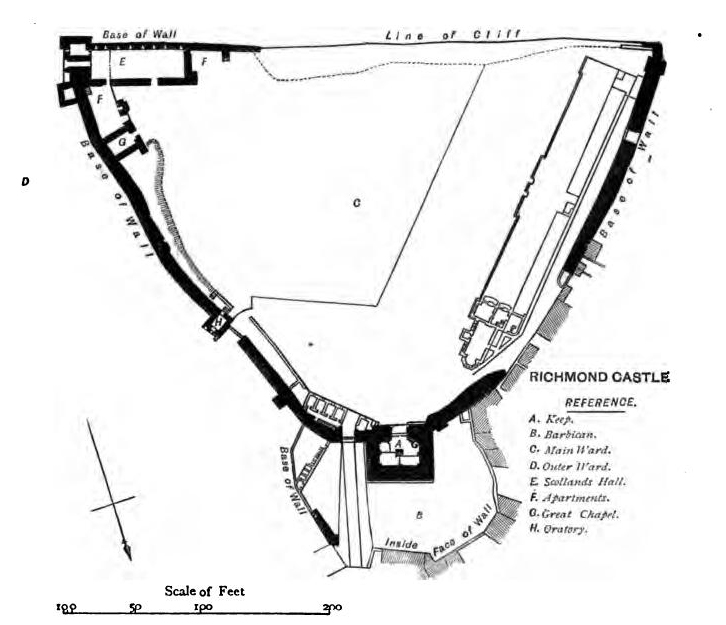
A plan of Richmond Castle's main enclosure, keep, and the small enclosure around the keep. The outer enclosure is off to the east.

Richmond Castle consists of four main parts: a triangular main enclosure, an outer enclosure to the east, a keep at the northern corner of the main enclosure, and a small enclosure around the keep.

== History ==
In 1069 William the Conqueror had put down a rebellion at York which was followed by his "harrying of the North" – an act of ethnic cleansing which depopulated large areas for a generation or more. As a further punishment, he divided up the lands of North Yorkshire among his most loyal followers. Alan Rufus, of Brittany, received the borough of Richmond and began constructing the castle to defend against further rebellions and to establish a personal power base. His holdings, called the Honour of Richmond, covered parts of eight counties and amounted to one of the most extensive Norman estates in England.

A 100-foot (30 m)-high keep of honey-coloured sandstone was constructed at the end of the 12th century by Duke Conan IV of Brittany. The Earldom of Richmond was seized in 1158 by Henry II of England. (Note: Henry II had intervened in the succession of Conan IV as the Duke of Brittany. Henry II had come into control of Nantes. Conan IV marched on Nantes and quickly took control of it. Henry II responded by seizing Conan IV's Earldom of Richmond) It was King Henry II who probably completed the keep which had 11-foot (3.4 m)-thick walls. Modern visitors can climb to the top of the keep for magnificent views of the town of Richmond. At the same time that the keep was probably completed, Henry II considerably strengthened the castle by adding towers and a barbican. On 5 June 1216, during the First Barons' War, King John gave orders to destroy (slight) Richmond Castle if it could not be held against the rebels.

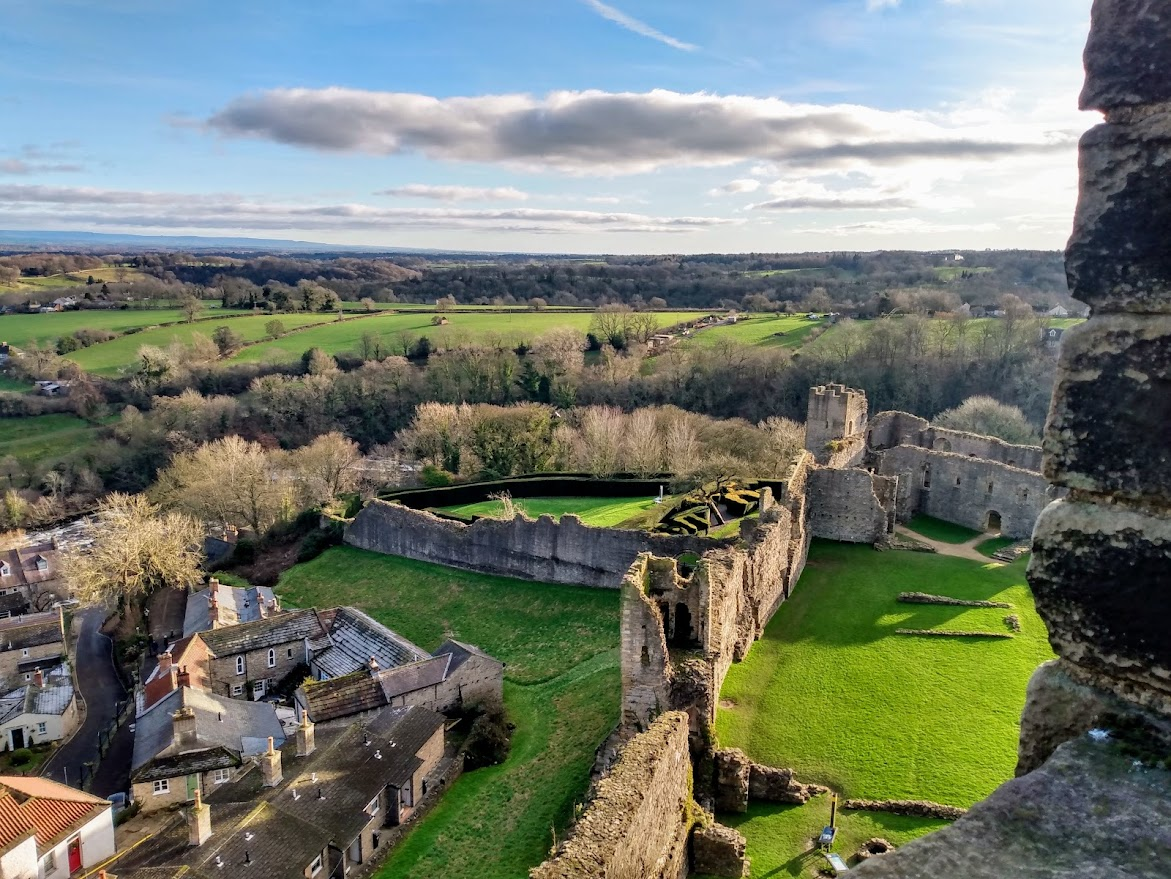
The Cockpit Garden and Scolland's Hall, viewed from the top of the keep

Henry III and King Edward I spent more money on the site including Edward's improvements to the keep interior. In addition to the main circuit of the wall, there was the barbican in front of the main gate which functioned as a sealed entry space, allowing visitors and wagons to be checked before they gained entry to the castle itself. On the other side of the castle, overlooking the river, was another enclosure or bailey called the Cockpit, which may have functioned as a garden and was overlooked by a balcony. A drawing of 1674 suggests there was another longer balcony overlooking the river side of Scolland's Hall, the great hall.

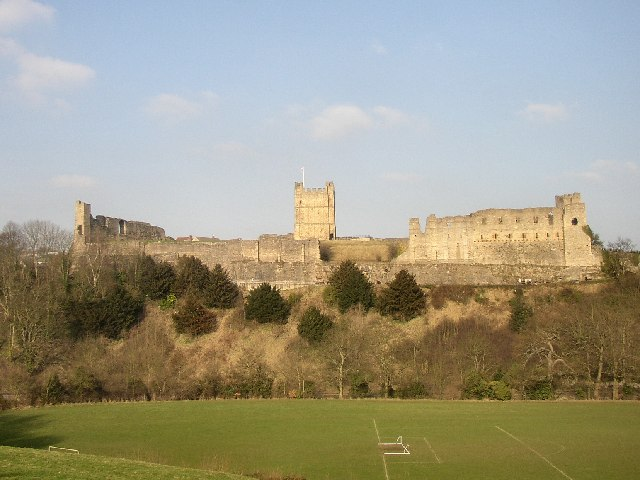
The castle seen from the south

Richmond Castle had fallen out of use as a fortress by the end of the 14th century and it did not receive major improvements after that date. A survey of 1538 shows it was partly in ruins, but paintings by Turner and others, together with the rise of tourism and an interest in antiquities, led to repairs to the keep in the early 19th century.

Richmond Castle by Philip Wilson Steer, 1903

In 1855 the castle became the headquarters of the North Yorkshire Militia, and a military barracks block was constructed in the great courtyard. For two years, from 1908 to 1910, the castle was the home of Robert Baden-Powell, later founder of the Boy Scouts, while he commanded the Northern Territorial Army but the barracks building was demolished in 1931.

The castle was used during the First World War as the base of the Non-Combatant Corps made up of conscientious objectors – conscripts who refused to fight. It was also used to imprison some conscientious objectors who refused to accept army discipline and participate in the war in any way. These included the "Richmond Sixteen" who were taken to France from the castle, charged under Field Regulations, and then sentenced to death, but their death sentences were commuted to ten years' hard labour.

The original 11th-century main gate arch is now in the basement of the later 12th century keep which was built in front of it; the original arch was unblocked in the 19th century.

The castle is a scheduled monument, a "nationally important" historic building and archaeological site which has been given protection against unauthorised change. It is also a Grade I listed building.

According to legend, King Arthur and his knights are sleeping in a cave underneath the castle. It is said that they were once discovered by a potter named Thompson, who ran away when they began to awake. Another legend tells that a drummer boy was lost while investigating a tunnel, and that his ghostly drumming is sometimes heard around the castle.

== Graffiti ==
The cell block at the castle contains 2,300 examples of graffiti left by those imprisoned there, from the mid-nineteenth century to the 1970s. Perhaps the most significant of the mark makers were the Richmond Sixteen, who were conscientious objectors imprisoned there during the First World War.

== See also ==
- Grade I listed buildings in North Yorkshire (district)
- Listed buildings in Richmond, North Yorkshire
- List of castles in England
