= Dyce Work Camp =

Scottish camp for conscientious objectors in World War I

Coordinates: 57.213°N 2.225°W

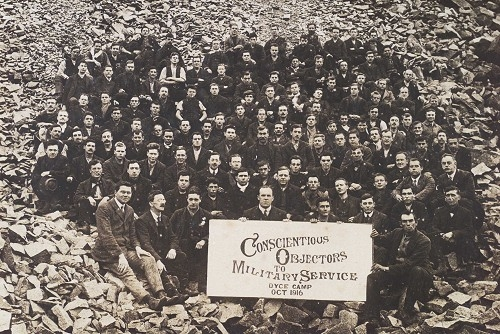
Publicity photograph posed for by the conscientious objectors

Dyce Work Camp was set up in August 1916 at quarries north-west of Aberdeen, Scotland, to accommodate conscientious objectors who had been in prison for refusing military service in World War I. These men, mostly from England, had been released on the condition that they performed "work of national importance" – breaking up granite rock to produce stone for road building. The conditions in the tented camp near the village of Dyce were poor, exacerbated by the very wet weather, and one man died of pneumonia without receiving medical treatment. Following an inquiry and a debate in parliament, the camp was closed in October 1916, with the ministerial statement that it had always been intended to be only temporary.

Dyce Work Camp

== Background ==
=== Conscription ===
When the United Kingdom joined in World War I by declaring war on Germany on 4 August 1914 the British Army was flooded with volunteers, in a seizure of patriotic fervour. However, by autumn 1915 there was a shortage of recruits to replace those killed or injured in the fighting, so a voluntary system, the Derby Scheme, was instituted, by which men could "attest" that they were willing to serve when the time came. However, this also did not produce enough volunteers, so plans were made to conscript men in an orderly manner. On 27 January 1916 the Military Service Act enlisted all men aged between 18 and 41 who lived in Great Britain (Ireland was excluded) and who were unmarried or widowed on 2 November 1915. Men were exempted if they were doing work vital for the war (such as engineering) or work essential for maintaining civilian life (such as farming). By 25 May 1916 a second act was passed to include married men.

=== Conscientious objectors ===
Local Military Service Tribunals were set up to consider objections to call-up on grounds of illness, occupation or conscientious objection. A hierarchy of appeal was established, in a few cases culminating in the Central Tribunal in London. Provision for conscientious objectors was most troublesome, because the Act had not defined the term. The public generally, and the tribunals, in particular, were often very unsympathetic to "conchies", even to those who had genuine moral, political or religious objections to war. During the course of the war more than 16,000 men claimed conscientious objection.

Those whose applications for exemption as conscientious objectors were refused were called up for military service and, if they did not co-operate, they were arrested and taken before a magistrates' court, where they were handed over to the Army. When they disobeyed Army orders, they were court-martialled and sentenced to imprisonment in civilian prisons. However, in the notorious cases of the Richmond Sixteen and 19 others, objectors were sent out to France and, when they refused to obey orders, they were sentenced to death by shooting. However, political repercussions led to the men being reprieved and returned to Britain for imprisonment.

=== Work centres ===
With the prisons now overcrowded and reports of serious ill-treatment of the objectors, a Committee on Employment of Conscientious Objectors was created under William Brace MP, Under-Secretary at the Home Office. (Note: The government under Asquith was a coalition government. Brace was a Liberal-Labour MP and a trade union official who at the age of 12 left school to become a coal miner working underground.) The committee decided to institute a scheme of compulsory employment but, faced with opposition from highly reluctant employers, men were sent to work on road building and forestry where commercial employers were not involved. Two prisons were converted to "work centres" for those unfit for outdoor work. These work programmes were not officially punitive – "The conditions should not be penal, but should not be appreciably better than those applying to Non-Combatants on Home Service". (Note: Despite the conditions being intended to be comparable with "Home Service", officials, the press and the public frequently argued that the conditions were better than for troops (in the trenches) overseas.")

== The camp at Dyce ==
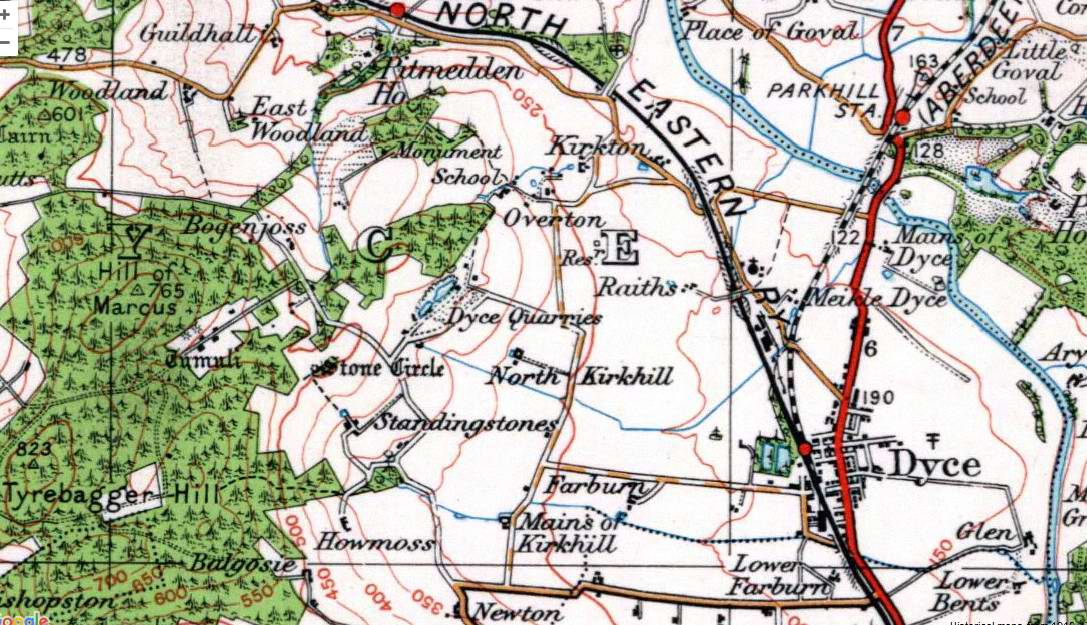
Historical map of Dyce and Dyce Quarries

It was under these circumstances that, starting from about 23 August 1916, 250 men arrived at Dyce Quarries to break up granite stones for roadmaking. Dyce is in Aberdeenshire a few miles north-west of Aberdeen and the quarries were on the side of a hill just outside the village. Because quarrying was not a protected occupation many workmen there had been called up, and it had been possible to persuade the employer to take on the conscientious objectors; he would not be responsible for paying their wages. The men had been released from prison with a suit of clothes and a train ticket, and they were trusted to turn up at the camp, which everyone did. Thirty-one had previously been sentenced to death before being reprieved, including fifteen of the Richmond Sixteen The first job for the men was to erect 27 bell tents and three marquees because there was no living accommodation on site. (Note: Supposedly army surplus from the Second Boer War.) Aberdeen City Council was not informed about what was happening and the press did not find out until 9 September. The Scottish Local Government Board sent a medical doctor, Dr Dittmar, to inspect the camp – he visited on 4–5 September and reported in detail on his overall findings. His report, and an article in the Aberdeen Free Press on 12 September provide the basis for much of the following description.

=== Working conditions ===
The work involved breaking stone, taking it in wheelbarrows to steam crushers, and loading the crushed chippings into trucks. The announced intention was that they were to work for ten hours a day, but initially, they only worked for five hours with an hour's break for lunch because it was accepted that people unused to hard physical work needed time to develop their strength. (Note: It was sometimes claimed that they actually worked ten hours a day and also that the men had expressed willingness to work ten hours if demand for stone required it.) Many of the workers were academics, teachers or clerks with no experience of manual labour, and they were paid 8 pence (£3 at current prices) per day. (Note: Minimum army pay was one shilling per day (£4 at current prices). It could be considerably more for soldiers of higher rank or with special skills.) Each week about 1000 tons of granite were shifted (32 truckloads a day).

=== Living conditions ===
The tents were army surplus from the Boer War. They were in poor condition and could leak, but Dittmar remarked that this applied to the tents of front-line troops as well. Each man was provided with a straw-filled mattress and three blankets. (Note: Dr Dittmar remarked that fighting troops were not provided with mattresses.) The water supply was found to be uncontaminated and plentiful and the drainage was also satisfactory. Food was the standard field service rations, which the doctor considered a "liberal allowance". Overall, Dittmar considered the camp was adequate in the short term, but wet weather and winter would make it necessary to have other arrangements in the future. About 90 workers had chosen to sleep in stables or dilapidated cottages or to live in local lodgings at their own expense.

One man was recovering from scarlet fever and he was removed to hospital, but otherwise the doctor considered illness was restricted to colds and sore throats.

== Death of Walter Roberts ==
20-year-old Walter Roberts arrived at Dyce after four months of hard labour in prison. Like most of the workers, he developed a cold when he arrived at the camp and on Wednesday 6 September he dictated a letter to his mother:.

"As I anticipated, it has only been a matter of time for the camp conditions to get the better of me. Bartle Wild is now writing to my dictation because I am now too weak to handle a pen myself. I don't want you to worry yourself because the doctor says I have only got a severe chill but it has reduced me very much. All these fellows here are exceedingly kind and are looking after me like bricks so there is no reason why I should not be strong in a day of two when I will write more personally and more fully.

The village doctor had diagnosed a chill, but the following night Roberts fell from his bed and ended up lying on wet ground for two hours. The next day the doctor said he was too ill to be moved, but no nursing or medical attention was provided – one of Roberts' colleagues (a dentist) did what he could to help. By early Friday Roberts had died of pneumonia before any medical help could be requested. Fenner Brockway, founder of the No-Conscription Fellowship, himself a conscientious objector and later MP, wrote demanding an inquiry.

== Inspections of the camp ==
Confronted with calls for a public inquiry into the death of Roberts and into conditions generally, the Home Office was only willing to conduct an internal inquiry, and Brace led a two-hour visit to the camp on 19 September. The press was briefed and they reported in detail on the findings, but the inquiry itself never published any report. The visitors decided that all workers should be housed in barns or lofts, and neither tents nor stalls in stables were suitable. Accommodation for the sick should be specifically prepared for the purpose, and seriously ill people should be taken to hospital. Five-hour working should continue until living conditions had been improved. As a result, some improvements were made and the use of tents had stopped before the camp was closed in October.

Another visitor was Ramsay MacDonald (later Prime Minister), who was at the time Independent Labour Party MP for Leicester. Born in north-east Scotland, he was a well-known, and even notorious, pacifist. (Note: For his "unacceptable" opinions he had been expelled from his home golf club, the Moray Golf Club.) His visit was in a personal capacity and it was on the same day as the official visit. The press reported that he considered the conditions "very bad" and he thought the whole concept of work camps was "uneconomical and wasteful".

== Public and political reactions ==
The opening of the camp had not been announced but by September the local population were very aware of an influx of young "foreigners", almost all Englishmen. Because the policy was to send objectors to work camps well away from their homes local Scots had also been sent far away. The workers were allowed to come and go in their free time and so this enabled the men, many of whom were well-educated and articulate, to take the opportunity to publicise their situation, including by publishing a camp newspaper The Granite Echo.

=== "Dyce Humbugs" ===
On 12 September 1916 the Aberdeen Daily Journal reported Roberts' death on page three, and on page four it published an editorial about the conscientious objectors headlined "Dyce Humbugs".

While all will regret that one of the conscientious objectors now doing their reluctant "bit" at Dyce should have succumbed as the result of a cold caught in our bracing climate, very few will approve of the statement issued by the Committee representing the conscientious objectors now at that place. The Committee speaks of "open-air life in a severe climate" but there has been no severity of climate during the past two months at least in the north. Complaint is also made because of the strain of "ten hours' work in a quarry every day", of leaking tents, and of the hardship of sleeping in "barns and cottages". Some will fall by the way under any state differing from their normal routine, but when we think of the conditions which the men in the trenches have had to bear during the past two years in fighting and dying for the safety and the liberty of these conscientious objectors, the complaints fall extremely flat, especially as the conditions complained of only apply to a comparatively small number who have for the most part refused to work or committed other offences.

The conscientious objector in war-time is a degenerate, or worse, who is out of harmony with the people of the nation which protects him in peace-time, and safeguards him in war-time, and the No-Conscription Fellowship which champions these shirkers of their duty is under so deep a cloud of suspicion that no fewer than twenty-seven raids by the police have been made within the past week or so on the houses of secretaries and members in the London area. It is interesting to learn that Mr. Ramsay MacDonald is to visit the Dyce shirkers shortly. The Trades Union Congress having set Mr MacDonald and the I.L.P. brood about their business, and the Lossiemouth golf course having been banned to him, the ex-Labour Chairman will no doubt find very congenial reception for his pro-German martyrdom trophies among the conscientious shirkers at Dyce.

On the same day, 12 September, the Aberdeen newspaper was able to report something of a lull in the Battle of the Somme, but it carried its usual daily account of the numbers of British casualties – 4936 including 1018 killed and 636 missing. Brief articles were published about seven local men who had been killed and, amongst the few mentions of the injured, there was a report about a Dyce man, George Riddoch of the Gordon Highlanders, who was wounded but had been returned to hospital in England.

== Closure of the camp ==
During the 19 October House of Commons debate on military service, and following the death of Roberts and the Home Office inquiry, Brace and MacDonald both spoke. Most significantly, Brace claimed that the camp had only been intended to be temporary, it would cost too much to improve it to the recommended standards, and that it would be closed by the end of the month. The closure actually took place on 25 October 1916.

The public and local press had been largely against the presence of the camp, generally disapproving of the people working there, and so they were pleased when the camp was closed down. On leaving the camp, the men were transferred to other work camps (some after a short leave at home), although some chose to leave the Home Office Scheme and return to prison.

The site was later occupied by a long-stay car park for Aberdeen Airport. (Note: The off-airport Aberdeen Airpark.)
