= Richmond Sixteen =

Group of "absolutist" English conscientious objectors during the First World War

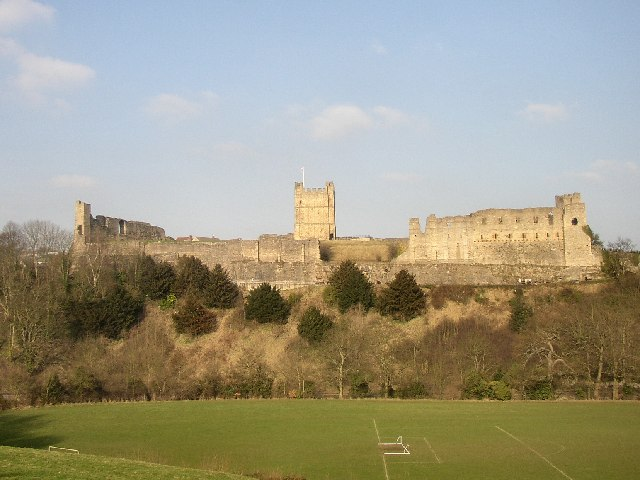
Richmond Castle

The Richmond Sixteen were a group of "absolutist" British conscientious objectors, during the First World War. Conscripted into the British Army in 1916, they refused to undertake even non-combatant military duties. Brought together at Richmond Castle, Yorkshire, most not knowing each other previously, they were transported to France, where they were court-martialled and formally sentenced to be executed by firing squad, but this sentence was immediately commuted to ten years' penal servitude. They were released in April 1919, several months after the Armistice of 11 November 1918 and a few weeks before the signing of the Treaty of Versailles.

== The sixteen men ==
The group was made up of a Quaker, five International Bible Students, and members of the Methodists, Congregationalists, Churches of Christ, and socialists. They were:

- Norman Gaudie (1887–1955), centre forward of the reserve Sunderland Football Club, from East Boldon;
- Alfred Matthew Martlew (1894–1917), a clerk at Rowntree's chocolate factory in York, originally from Gainsborough, Lincolnshire;
- Herbert (Bert) George and William (Billy) Edwin Law, brothers from Darlington;
- Alfred Myers, an ironstone miner from Carlin How;
- John Hubert (Bert) Brocklesby (1889–1962), schoolteacher and Methodist lay preacher, from Conisbrough;
- Charles Ernest Cryer, from Cleveland;
- Robert Armstrong Lown, from Ely;

and eight men from Leeds:

- Clifford Cartwright, from the Churches of Christ;
- John William Routledge;
- Ernest Shillito Spencer (1897–1957), a Quaker clerk in a factory;
- Clarence and Stafford Hall, brothers;
- Charles Rowland Jackson;
- Leonard Renton;
- Charles Herbert Senior,

The latter five were all International Bible Students, now known as Jehovah's Witnesses.

== Background ==
The First World War began with Austria-Hungary's declaration of war against Serbia on 28 July 1914. After other states had joined in in support of one side or the other, the impending German invasion of Belgium was considered to justify the United Kingdom of Great Britain and Ireland declaring war against Germany on 4 August. At the time, the British government was responsible for the foreign affairs of the five overseas Dominions, as well as those of the British colonies and protectorates, so its declaration of war was made on behalf of the whole British Empire.

By the winter of 1915, the British Army had suffered so many men killed or disabled that in January 1916 Parliament introduced conscription. The Military Service Act 1916 provided that in Great Britain (but not in Ireland, the whole of which was still part of the United Kingdom), single men aged between eighteen and forty-one were liable to call-up for war service in the Army; an amending Act later in 1916 included married men, and another in 1918 extended the upper age limit to fifty-one. There were exemptions for serving members of the Army and Navy, ministers of religion, those engaged in "work of national importance", men with dependents such as widowers with young children, and men who were disabled or in poor health. There was also provision for those with conscientious objections to fighting: men could object on religious or moral grounds, but even if accepted as genuine conscientious objectors (often referred to as "C.O.s") by the Tribunals set up under the Act, they could, at a tribunal's discretion, still be conscripted into the Army for non-combatant duties.

== Non-Combatant Corps ==
Thousands of men claiming to be conscientious objectors were questioned by the Military Service Tribunals, but very few were exempted from all war service. The vast majority were designated to fight or to join the Non-Combatant Corps (NCC), specially created exclusively for COs. For those accepted as having genuine moral or religious objections to fighting, being under military orders in the NCC was intended to make them support the war in non-fighting roles, such as transport or non-lethal stores. The relatively small number who refused such non-combatant duties were called "absolutists".

The men who became the "Richmond Sixteen" had appeared before Tribunals, pleading their objections to war and the military, and had all been accepted as conscientious objectors, and instead of being designated for fighting they were designated as non-combatants. They conscientiously ignored notices to report to the NCC, so were arrested by the civil police and taken before a magistrates' court, where they were handed over to a military escort. Eventually they were taken to join the 2nd Northern Company of the Non-Combatant Corps, stationed at Richmond Castle, in the North Riding of Yorkshire. They refused to wear uniform or undertake any duties at all, as they had done ever since they had been "handed over", and were locked in eight small cells, pending court-martial for disobeying military orders. Similar disobedience by forcibly enlisted COs had been taking place over the past two months at military barracks and camps around the country, resulting in courts-martial and sentences of imprisonment.

== France and imprisonment ==
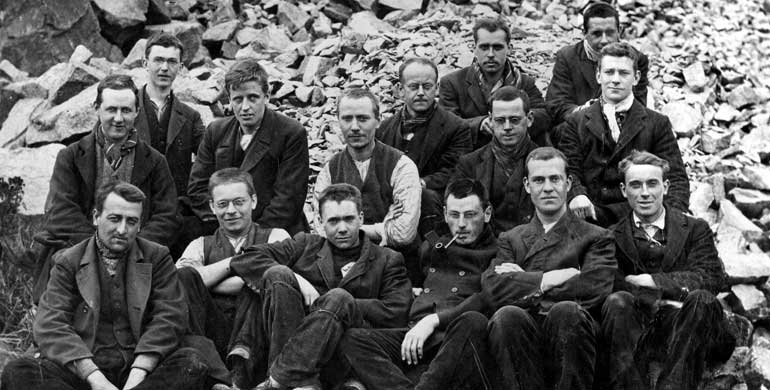
The "Harwich Frenchmen" in 1916, near Aberdeen

At some level in the military hierarchy – some have suggested it was the Secretary of State for War in person, Field Marshal Kitchener – it was ordered that four random groups of the resisting COs, including what became the 'Richmond Sixteen', should be sent to the Western Front, where they could be court-martialled for refusing to obey orders and face the death penalty; that was not applicable for such an offence within Great Britain. The others sent to the front at the same time were seventeen men at Harwich, nine at Seaford, and two at Kinmel Park, Abergele, making forty-four absolutists in all. It was later claimed that these "Frenchmen", as they became known, went to France willingly, supposedly anxious to keep up their resistance on a greater stage, but no evidence has been found to support this.

While the seventeen "Frenchmen" sent from Harwich were on a train travelling through the London suburbs, one of them threw a letter out of the train window addressed to the office of the No-Conscription Fellowship (NCF), describing the men's predicament. This was picked up by a friendly railwayman and posted. The NCF passed the letter to Arnold Rowntree, a Quaker member of parliament for York, who took the matter up with H. H. Asquith, the British prime minister.

On arrival in France, the men were moved from place to place, spending their time in a variety of guard rooms, sometimes lodged "on parole" in rest camps, and were eventually held with other prisoners near Boulogne. However, they suffered no "field punishments", as other conscientious objectors before them had done. At Boulogne they were told they were "in the presence of the enemy" and that wilfully disobeying orders could now result in their being shot by firing squad. They were therefore urged to join other COs who had accepted their assigned role in the NCC, however reluctantly, and they were also falsely told that the 'Harwich Frenchmen' had already "saved their lives" by giving in and obeying military orders. The sixteen men were then given twenty-four hours' leave to make up their minds, and they considered their position at leisure, five of them even going swimming. All sixteen remained convinced that supporting the war in any way would be morally wrong, and as a group they decided to hold out, partly on principle and partly because they believed that agreeing to obey military orders would lead to other objectors being treated in the same way. (There is a persistent legend that one of sixteen – never named – decided at this point to "give in", but the names of all sixteen appear in War Office court-martial records of the soldiers formally sentenced to death.) The next day, the men all continued to refuse to obey all orders and were returned to the guard room. They were individually court martialled, eleven (Cartwright, Cryer, Stafford Hall, Herbert Law, William Law, Lown, Martlew, Myers, Renton, Senior, Spencer) on 12 June 1916, and five (Brocklesby, Gaudie, Clarence Hall, Jackson, Routledge) on 13 June 1916. They were all found guilty, and on 24 June 1916 all sixteen were sentenced to be shot at dawn, but this was immediately commuted to ten years' penal servitude. The other "Frenchmen" were tried in separate courts-martial on 7, 10, 13, and 24 June 1916 and similarly sentenced to death and reprieved, except for seven who received shorter terms of imprisonment without any formal sentence of death. The outcome was considered the result of the influence of Asquith, following the death of Kitchener at sea on 5 June, a week before the courts-martial and two weeks before the sentencing.

The men were transferred to Rouen, from where they were sent back to England by ship, after facing an angry French crowd on the quay-side. From the ship they were taken to Winchester Prison, where they found the Harwich seventeen, who had been at Boulogne before them. Some were then taken to Dyce Work Camp. On 11 July 1917 Alfred Martlew was found drowned in the River Ouse, reported in a newspaper under the heading "An Objector Drowned". The other men were released unconditionally in April 1919, well after the Armistice. On returning home, they were widely seen as cowards and were spurned by their local communities. They were formally disfranchised for five years, beginning on 1 September 1921, but as there was at the time no mechanism for putting disfranchisement into effect, the procedure had little effect. However, some of the men were unable to get jobs on release.

== Later life ==
Robert Armstrong Lown went to live in Stalham, Norfolk, and died there in 1954.

Ernest Shillito Spencer returned to live at Leeds where he married in 1925 and died in 1957.

Hubert Brocklesby returned to teaching and moved to Barton-upon-Humber. He died in a Scunthorpe hospital in 1962, leaving a widow, Olive.

== Commemorations ==
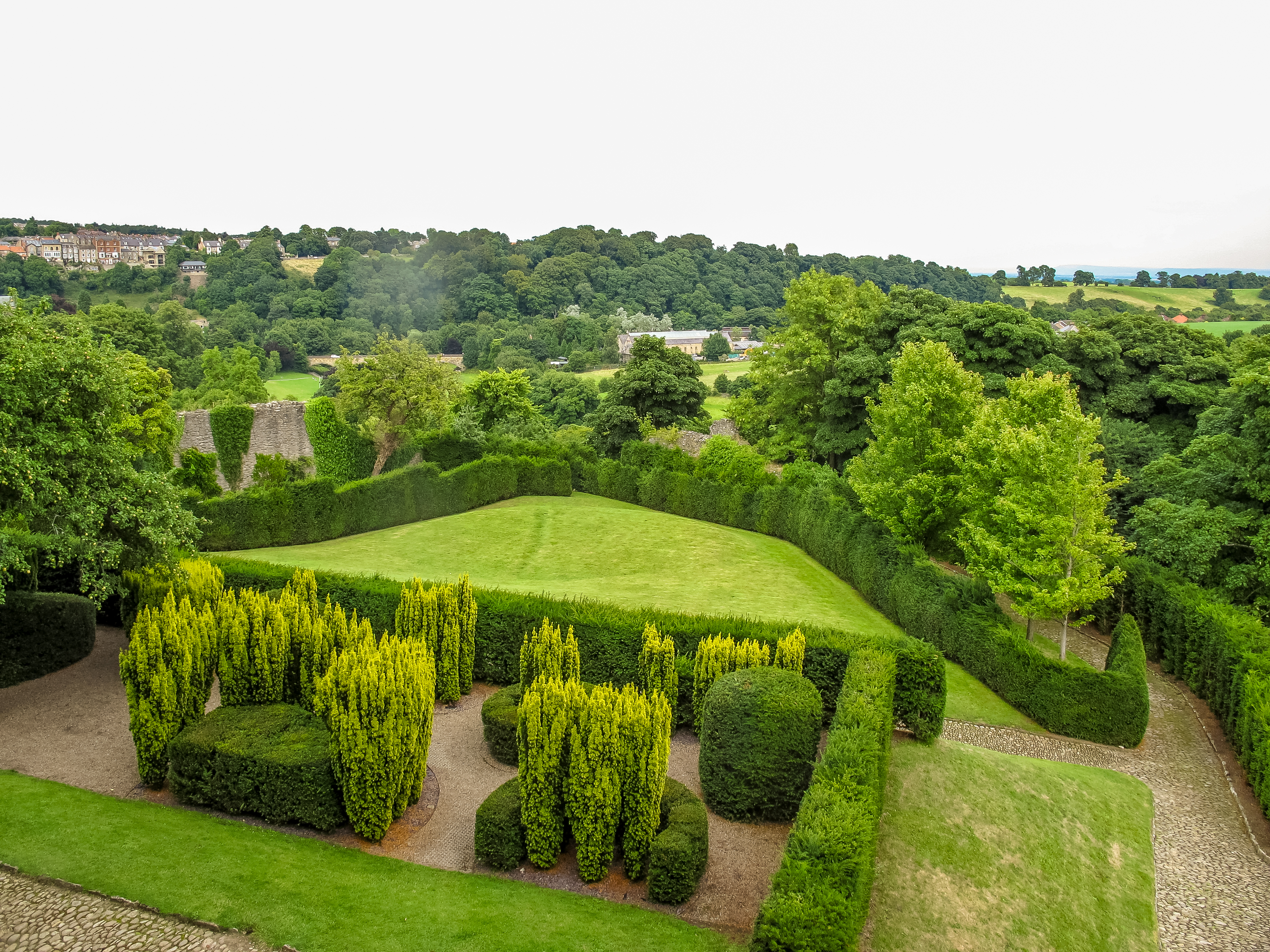
The Cockpit Garden, Richmond Castle

In 1995, the men's story was turned into a Tyne Tees Television documentary called The Richmond Sixteen, and, in 2007, they were one of the subjects of a book by Will Ellsworth-Jones. At Richmond Castle, early in the 21st century English Heritage laid out an area called the Cockpit Garden as a memorial to the men known as the Richmond Sixteen. However, the decision was controversial in Richmond, as the town's economy depends heavily on business from the nearby British army garrison at Catterick. In June 2013 the Teesdale and Cleveland Area Quaker Meeting organized a silent event at Richmond Castle in honour of the sixteen men. In May 2016 English Heritage announced plans to conserve the copious amounts of graffiti that the men had left on the walls of Richmond Castle. Most of this is in pencil and is deteriorating.

External audio
- Voices from the Walls – Richmond Castle's Conscientious Objectors, Speaking with Shadows, published by English Heritage, retrieved 2 December 2019

Norman Gaudie's story is depicted in the film Asunder, directed by Esther Johnson and funded by 14-18 NOW, a First World War centenary arts commission.

== See also ==
- Opposition to World War I
