= Richmond Castle (painting) =

Painting by Philip Wilson Steer

- Artist: Philip Wilson Steer
- Year: 1903
- Type: Oil on canvas, landscape painting
- Dimensions: 80.6 cm × 64.8 cm (31.7 in × 25.5 in)
- Location: Tate Britain, London

Richmond Castle is a 1903 landscape painting by the British artist Philip Wilson Steer. It features a distant view of the Norman era Richmond Castle in the North Yorkshire town of Richmond. Steer was a noted figure in the British Impressionist movement. He produced this work during his second visit to the town, and his vantage point looks across the River Swale. The painting was originally exhibited at the New English Art Club in 1903 where it was purchased by the newspaper magnate Alfred Harmsworth. The picture was given to the Tate Gallery in Pimlico in 1917 by Michael Sadler via the Art Fund.

== Bibliography ==
- Holt, Ysanne. Philip Wilson Steer Seren Books, 1992.
- Laughton, Bruce. Philip Wilson Steer, 1860-1942. Clarendon Press, 1971.
