= Seated Nude, The Black Hat =

Painting by Philip Wilson Steer

Seated Nude, Black Hat
- Artist: Philip Wilson Steer
- Year: c.1900
- Type: Oil on canvas, nude art
- Dimensions: 50.8 cm × 40.6 cm (20.0 in × 16.0 in)
- Location: Tate Britain, London

Seated Nude, The Black Hat is a 1900 oil painting by the British artist Philip Wilson Steer. A nude, it depicts a life model, Miss Geary, trying on a hat in the artist's studio. Steer was persuaded not to exhibit the work by friends who considered it "indecent". Given the prevalence of nude paintings in the late Victorian era, it is unclear what they objected to, although Steer himself later suggested it was the hat. Steer had been one of the leading British impressionists. Today the painting is in the collection of the Tate Britain in London, having been presented by the Contemporary Art Society in 1941.

== Bibliography ==
- Laughton, Bruce. Philip Wilson Steer, 1860-1942. Clarendon Press, 1971.
- Maas, Jeremy. Victorian Painters. Barrie & Jenkins, 1978.
