= Theodore Roussel =

French-born English painter and graphic artist (1847–1926)

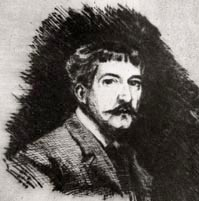
- Self-portrait (1901)
- Born: 23 March 1847; Lorient, Brittany, France
- Died: 23 April 1926 (aged 79); Hastings, East Sussex, England
- Education: self-taught
- Known for: landscapes and genre paintings

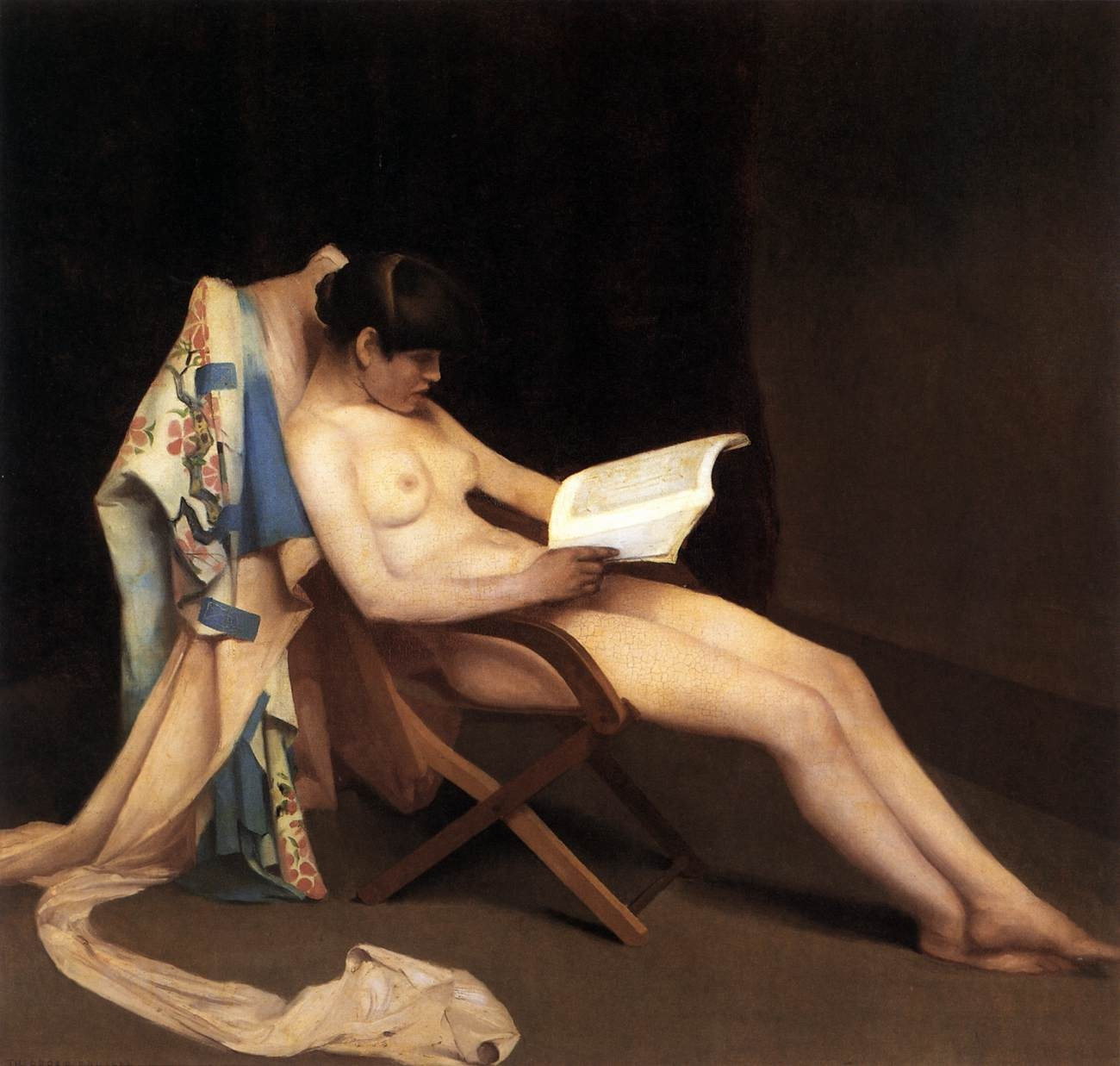
The Reading Girl (1886)

Theodore Casimir Roussel (1847–1926) was a French-born English painter and graphic artist, best known for his landscapes and genre scenes.

== Life and work ==
He came to painting late, in 1872, after his military service had ended, and he was entirely self-taught. His earliest works were scenes of daily life, rendered in the style of the Old Masters. In 1878, he moved to London and, two years later, married the widow Frances Amelia Smithson Bull (1844–1909), a distant collateral relative of James Smithson. In 1885, he met James McNeill Whistler, who became a lifelong friend and mentor.

Two years later, he made a sensational début at an exhibition held by the New English Art Club when he presented The Reading Girl, a life-size nude. The public response was expressed by a reviewer from The Spectator, who wrote: "...it is Realism of the worst kind: The eye of the artist sees only the vulgar appearance of his model, making it blunt and crude...". In career terms, however, the notoriety was more beneficial than otherwise. Later, Sir William Orpen would declare it to be the best nude of the period.

His model was Hetty Pettigrew (1867–1953). She and her sisters Rose (1872–1958) and Lily (1870–1920) were popular and well-paid models who worked for Whistler, William Holman Hunt, John Everett Millais and others. Hetty became Roussel's mistress and gave him a child but, when his wife died, he married Arthur Melville's widow, Ethel, instead.

Not long after the notorious exhibition, he acquired a home in Parsons Green and spent most of his time painting atmospheric landscapes, usually featuring the Thames. At this time, he also learned the techniques of etching and drypoint from Whistler, and he is considered one of the pioneers of color etching in England. He often took part in the exhibitions of the "Royal Society of British Artists" and the "Royal Scottish Academy". In 1908, he was a founding member of the "Allied Artists' Association".
