= An Idyll of 1745 =

Painting by John Everett Millais

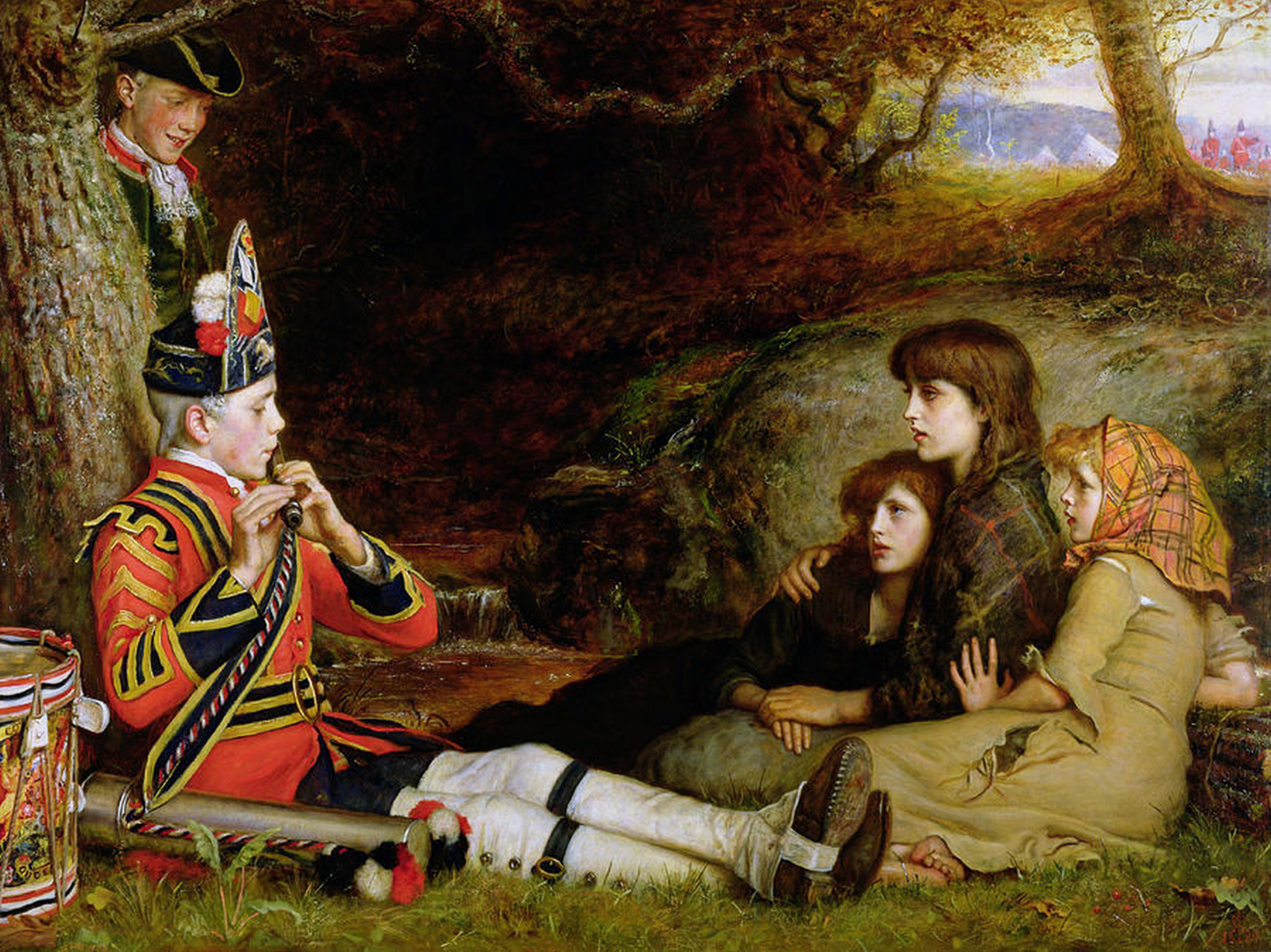
- Artist: John Everett Millais
- Year: 1884
- Type: Oil on canvas, genre painting
- Dimensions: 140 cm × 191 cm (55 in × 75 in)
- Location: Lady Lever Art Gallery; Merseyside

An Idyll of 1745 is an 1884 oil painting by the English artist John Everett Millais. It depicts a fictional scene from the Jacobite rising of 1745. During an interlude in the conflict, a drummer boy from an infantry regiment of the British Army plays a fife, watched by three Scottish girls. A number of paintings of Jacobite-themed paintings were produced in the Victorian era including Charlie Is My Darling by Millais.

The three artists models for the girls were the sisters Hetty Pettigrew, Lily and Rose Pettigrew. Today the painting is in the Lady Lever Art Gallery having been acquired in 1922 when the work was transferred to the gallery by Lord Leverhulme from his own private collection.

== See also ==
- List of paintings by John Everett Millais

== Bibliography ==
- Ausoni, Alberto. Music in Art. Getty Publications, 2009.
- Barlow, Paul. Time Present and Time Past: The Art of John Everett Millais. Routledge, 2017.
- Maas, Jeremy. Victorian Painters. Barrie & Jenkins, 1988.
