= Hetty Pettigrew =

British art model (1867–1953)

Harriet Selina Pettigrew
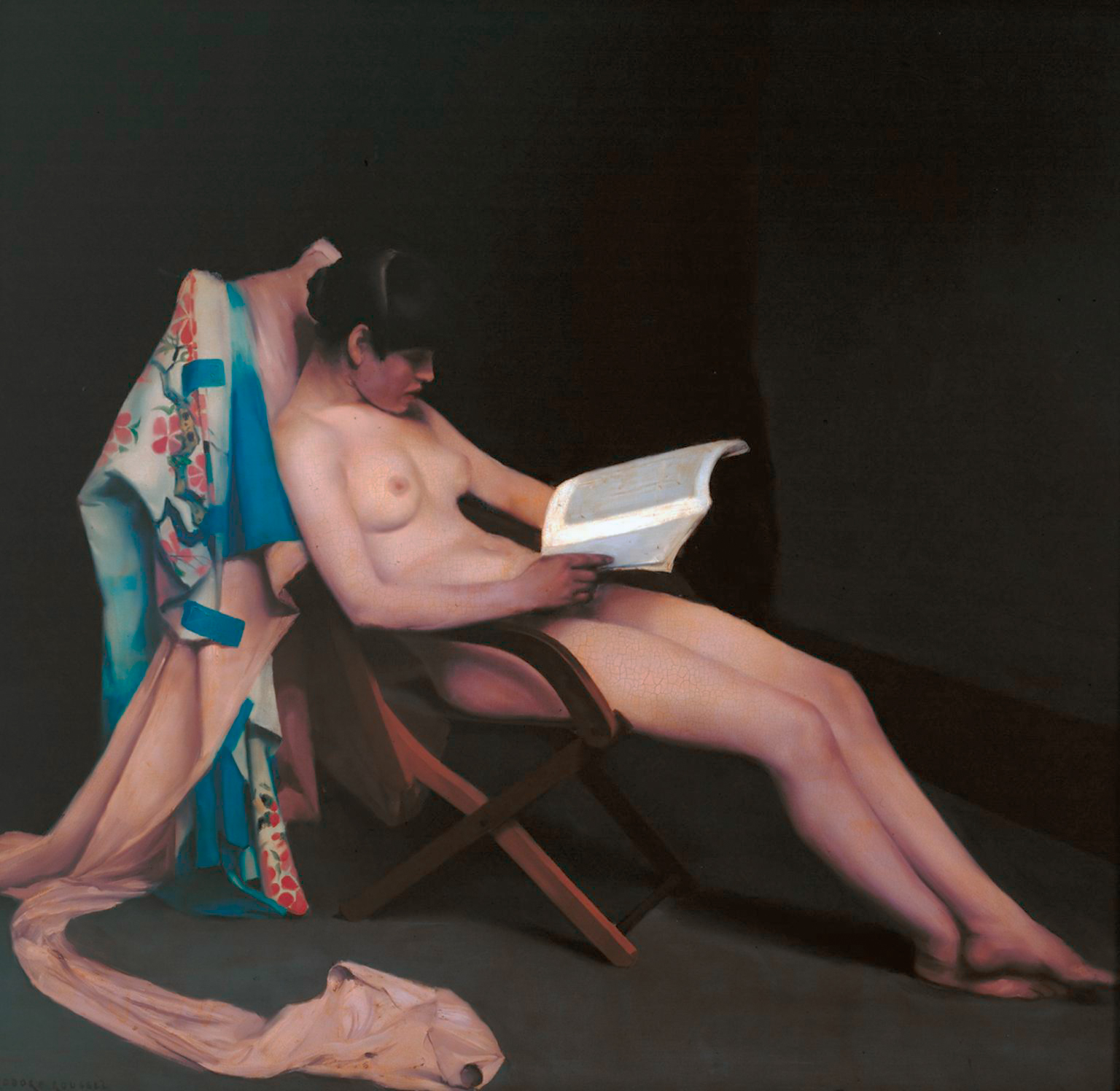
- Hetty Pettigrew in The Reading Girl oil on canvas (1887) by Theodore Roussel
- Born: Harriet Selina Pettigrew; 9 October 1867; Portsmouth, England
- Died: 1953; London, England
- Known for: Artists' model, sculptor
- Notable work: Modeling for Whistler, Millais, Godward, Roussel

Harriet Selina Pettigrew (9 October 1867 – 1953), commonly known as Bessie or Hetty Pettigrew, was a British artists' model and sculptor from Portsmouth. She was one of three sisters, along with Rose and Lily Pettigrew, who achieved prominence as models in the London art world in the late 19th century.

== Early life and family ==
Born in Portsmouth in 1867, Hetty was one of twelve children (nine boys and three girls) of William Joseph Pettigrew, a cork cutter, and Harriet Davis, a seamstress. After the sudden death of their father when Hetty was around 15 years old in 1882, she moved with her mother and two younger sisters to London to pursue artistic opportunities at the suggestion of an art teacher of her brother Charles because of their Pre-Raphaelite looks, and the poverty of the family.

== Modeling career ==
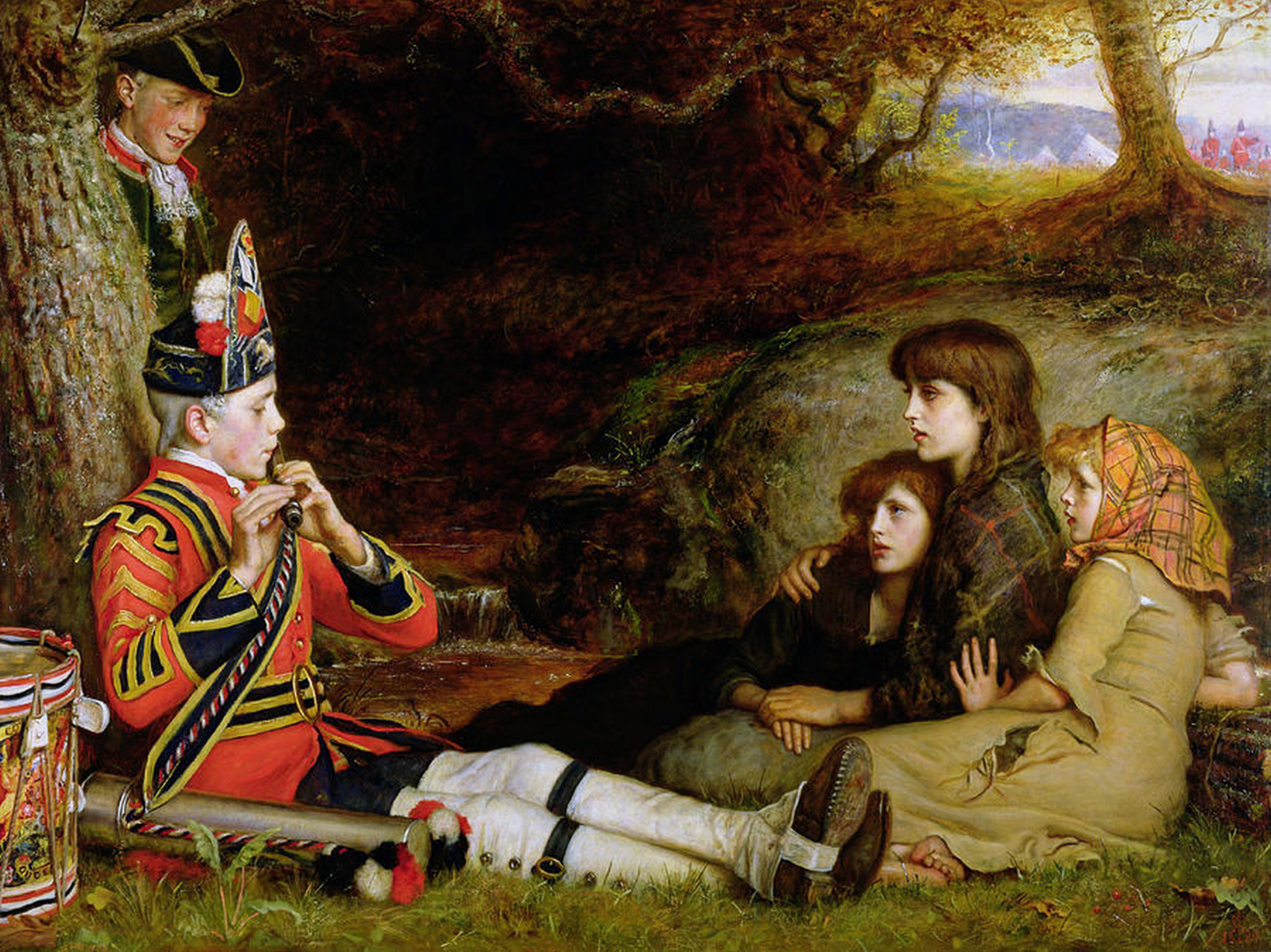
An Idyll of 1745 by John Everett Millais, 1884. The three female artists models on the right were Lily, Hetty and Rose

In London, the three Pettigrew sisters established themselves as sought-after artists' models, posing for renowned painters including James McNeill Whistler, William Holman Hunt, John Everett Millais (who described them as "three little gypsy girls"), John William Godward, and others. As her sister Rose recalled, "We became fashionable among the artists. Many even tried to bribe us to make us sit for them; but we were too proud to fall for those kinds of tricks. Rarely was there an exhibition that did not have some portrait of 'the beautiful Misses Pettigrew,' as they called us. We never posed for less than half a guinea a day, which, in those straitened times, was a lot of money."

Rose described Hetty's appearance as "Smooth, glossy chestnut hair, glorious complexion and large hazel eyes."

== Relationship with Theodore Roussel ==
Hetty Pettigrew had a particularly close association with the French painter Theodore Roussel, whom she met in 1884. She frequently modeled for Roussel from the 1880s until the early 1910s, acted as his studio assistant, and may also have been his pupil. Their relationship became romantic, and around 1900 Hetty gave birth to their daughter Iris. When Roussel's wife died in 1909, he married Ethel Melville, widow of Scottish watercolorist Arthur Melville, in 1914 and Hetty refused all further contact with him.

== Sculpting career ==
In addition to her modeling work, Hetty Pettigrew pursued a career as a sculptor later in life. Her works were exhibited at venues such as the Royal Glasgow Institute of the Fine Arts. She associated with prominent sculptors of the era, including Hamo Thornycroft and John Tweed.

== Death ==
Harriet Selina "Hetty" Pettigrew died in London in 1953 at the age of 86.
