= Dorothy Annan =

British painter

- Born: Dorothy Ward; 20 January 1900; Pará, Brazil
- Died: 28 June 1983 (aged 83); Snettisham, Norfolk
- Known for: Painting, Mural, Pottery
- Movement: Modernism, Cubism

Dorothy Annan (20 January 1900 – 28 June 1983) was an English painter, potter and muralist who was born in Brazil to British parents and was educated in France and Germany. Her works were frequently shown at the Leicester Galleries in London and she had her first solo show there in 1945.

== Biography ==
Born in 1900, Annan exhibited with the Artists' International Association, and once featured in an art show in an air-raid shelter beside work by Augustus John during World War II. Annan also exhibited works at the Royal Academy, with the London Group and with the New English Art Club. In 1949 she taught at the Bath College of Art. Annan was married to sculptor Trevor Tennant (1900–80). For a time they lived in a single-decker bus. She died in 1983 at the Sue Ryder Home in Snettisham, Norfolk.

Examples of Annan's paintings are held in many national collections and she is also known for her many mosaics and tile murals, several of which have been destroyed in recent decades. The largest single example, the Expanding Universe at the Bank of England, was destroyed in 1997. Only three of her major public murals are believed to survive.

== Fleet Building telecom murals ==
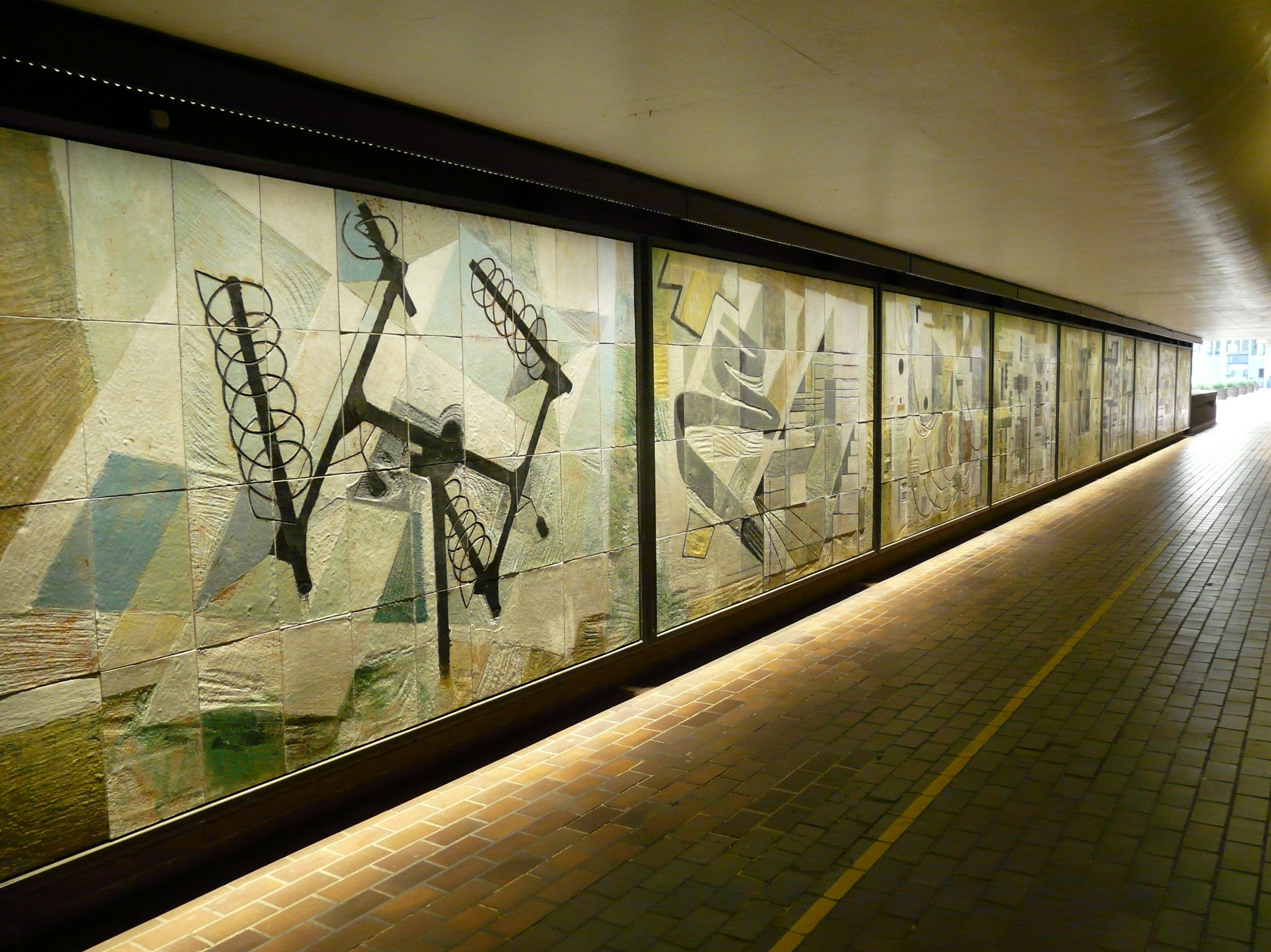
Fleet Building murals, now relocated to the Barbican

In November 2011 the Department for Culture, Media and Sport, DCMS, granted Grade II listed status to Annan's murals on the front of the Fleet Building, 70 Farringdon Street, formerly the largest telephone exchange in London. The murals were commissioned at a cost of £300 per panel in 1960. Annan visited the Hathernware pottery in Loughborough and hand-scored her designs onto each wet clay tile, her brush marks can also be seen in the fired panels. English Heritage advised the DCMS that the nine ceramic tile murals, which depict pylons, cables, telegraph poles and generators, were of "historic interest" to the telecoms industry and had "relative rarity as surviving works of 1960s mural art". The listing was supported by the Twentieth Century Society and the Tiles & Architectural Ceramics Society, artist Frank Auerbach and Penelope Curtis, Director of Tate Britain. The building is owned by Goldman Sachs, who wished to redevelop the site and opposed the listing of the murals.

In January 2013, the City of London Corporation agreed to take ownership of the murals, and in September 2013 these were moved to a permanent location in a publicly accessible part of the Barbican Estate. They are displayed in their original sequence within an enclosed section of the Barbican Highwalk between Speed House and the Barbican Centre.

The family of Annan and Tennant donated their archive to the Archive of Sculptors' Papers at the Henry Moore Foundation.
