= Francesco Di Cocco =

Italian painter

Francesco Di Cocco (1900 – 1989) was an Italian painter belonging to the modern movement.

== Biography ==
He was born in Rome to Florentine parents. After a brief spell in the Army while in Albania in 1919, he returned to Rome, where he was influenced by Giacomo Balla, and spent time in the studio of Leonardo Castellani. He exhibited at the 3rd Biennale Romano in 1925, the next year in Milan at the first exhibition of the Novecento Italiano. He would travel to Paris. He continued to exhibit throughout the following decades in Italy and abroad.

In 1938, he accompanied a personal exhibition at the Comet Art Gallery in New York City. He was recruited to paint murals for Italian pavilion designed by Andrea Busiri Vici at the 1939 World's Fair. In 1938, a letter from the Quadriennale board inquired as to his race prior to exhibiting, he refrained from returning to Italy under fascism. He moved to New Mexico and California, where he remained until 1953, exhibiting at various museums on the West Coast.

His style changed from a depiction of languorous figures in the 1930s, to Surrealist paintings of imaginary amusement parks in the 1940s, to abstractions after the mid-1950s.

He returned to Rome in 1969. with major exhibitions Macerata in 1984, and retrospectives in 1991 and 1996.
