= Philip Wilson Steer =

English painter

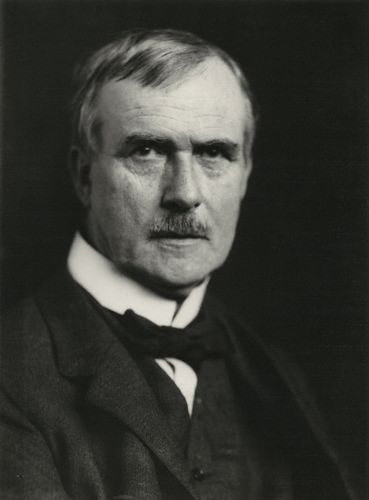
- Philip Wilson Steer, photograph by George Charles Beresford, 1922.
- Born: 28 December 1860; Birkenhead, Cheshire, England
- Died: 18 March 1942 (aged 81); London, England
- Education: Gloucester School of Art, South Kensington Drawing Schools, Académie Julian, École des Beaux Arts
- Known for: Painting

Philip Wilson Steer OM (28 December 1860 – 18 March 1942) was a British painter of landscapes, seascapes plus portraits and figure studies. He was also an influential art teacher. His sea and landscape paintings made him a leading figure in the Impressionist movement in Britain but in time he turned to a more traditional English style, clearly influenced by both John Constable and J. M. W. Turner, and spent more time painting in the countryside rather than on the coast. As a painting tutor at the Slade School of Art for many years he influenced generations of young artists.

== Life and work ==
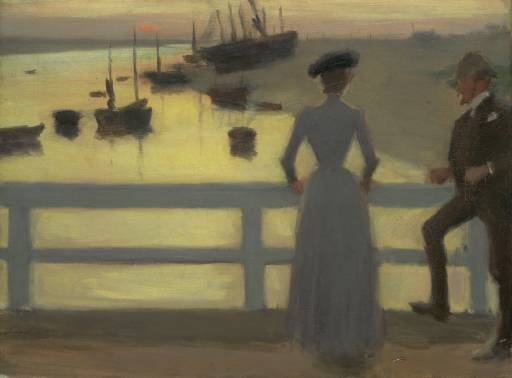
The Bridge (1887) (Tate)

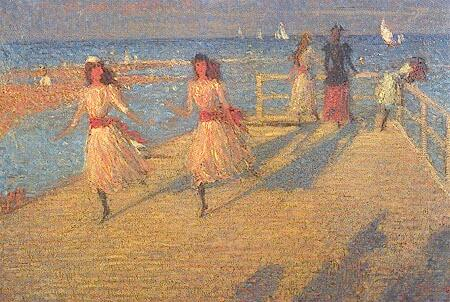
Girls Running: Walberswick Pier (Tate)

Steer was born in Birkenhead, Cheshire, the son of a portrait painter and art teacher, Philip Steer (1810–1871) and his wife, Emma Harrison (1816–1898). When Steer was three years old the family moved to Whitchurch near Monmouth from where, after a period of home schooling, he attended the Hereford Cathedral School. After finding the examinations of the British Civil Service too demanding, he became an artist in 1878. He studied at the Gloucester School of Art, then from 1880 to 1881 at the South Kensington Drawing Schools. He was rejected by the Royal Academy of Art school, and so studied in Paris between 1882 and 1884, firstly at the Académie Julian, and then in the École des Beaux Arts under Alexandre Cabanel, where he became a follower of the Impressionist school. In Paris he was greatly influenced by seeing works by Édouard Manet and James McNeill Whistler and the French impressionists.

When he returned to England, Steer established a studio in London and began to develop an impressionist style in which he depicted beach scenes and seascapes in a silvery translucent light. His painting of Poole Harbour, completed in 1890, is an example of the outstanding atmospheric effects he was able to capture. Steer often stayed at the Suffolk coastal town of Walberswick and the works he painted there are remarkable for their freshness and depiction of light and shade. Works such as The Bridge, The Beach at Walberswick (1890) and Girls Running: Walberswick Pier (1894) show Steer at the peak of his abilities. His misty Impressionist style is striking in such paintings as The Beach and Fisher Children. Steer also painted scenes at nearby Southwold.

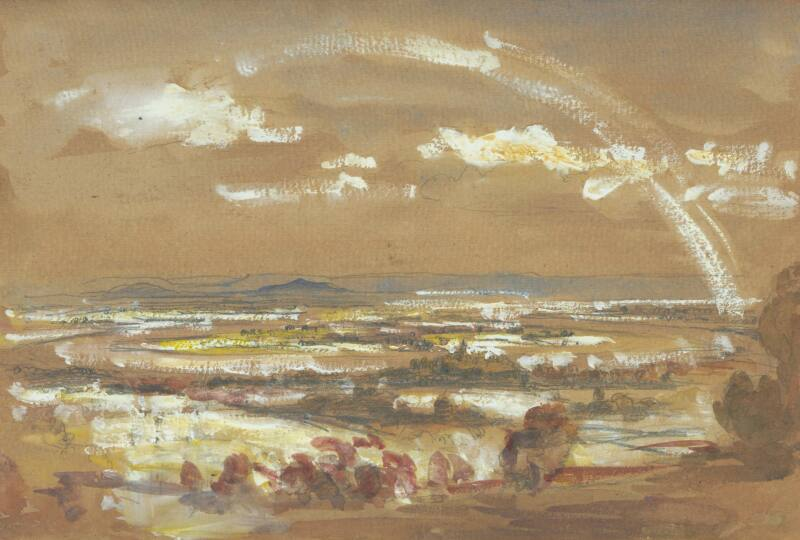
The Horseshoe Bend of The Severn - ABDAG003034

Between 1883 and 1885 Steer exhibited at the Royal Academy and in 1886 he became a founder of the New English Art Club, with whom he continued to exhibit regularly. With Walter Sickert he became a leading British Impressionist, showing works at the London Impressionist exhibition held at the Goupil Gallery in 1889. Besides the French Impressionists he was influenced by Whistler and, later, such old masters as François Boucher, Thomas Gainsborough, John Constable and J. M. W. Turner. Steer was frequently criticised by conservative British critics for his impressionist works such as Boulogne Sands, so much so that for a period he stopped showing his more adventurous works. In the 1890s as he moved away from French Impressionism, Steer's work received greater appreciation. Portraits, such as Girl Reading A Book from 1895, a portrait of Rose Pettigrew, his model and girlfriend, and Portrait of Mrs Raynes (1922) were well received. In 1887 Steer spent some time at the Etaples art colony. In the early 1890s he began to paint more in watercolours than he had previously. Between 1893 and 1911 he visited several sites associated with the 18th century picturesque tour.

In 1893 Frederick Brown, the newly appointed Slade Professor of Art, appointed Steer as Professor of Painting at the Slade School of Fine Art in London. Steer would teach there, alongside Brown, Henry Tonks and Walter Russell until 1930. This group would continue the Slade tradition of realism in painting and drawing and would influence generations of young artists including Augustus John, William Orpen, Stanley Spencer, Paul Nash and Anna Airy. Based in Chelsea, in the summers he painted in Yorkshire, the Cotswolds and the West Country and on the south and east coasts of Britain.

During World War I Steer was recruited by Lord Beaverbrook, the chairman of the British War Memorials Committee, to paint pictures of the Royal Navy and he spent some time painting naval formations at Dover.

In 1927 Steer began to lose the sight in one eye but he continued to paint, although mostly in watercolours rather than in oils, and his compositions became much looser, at times almost abstract but by 1940 he had stopped painting. In 1931 he was awarded the Order of Merit and died in London, 18 March 1942. His self-portrait is in the collection in the Uffizi Gallery, Florence. Steer never married and throughout his life was a hypochondriac but was also benign, modest, amusing and held in great regard by those who knew him.

== Gallery ==
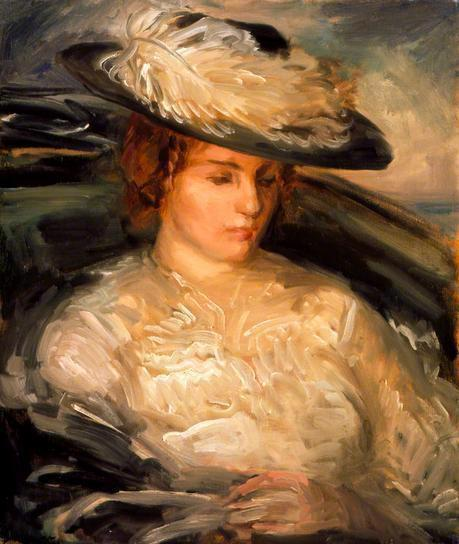
Convalescent, 1900

Seated Nude, The Black Hat, 1900

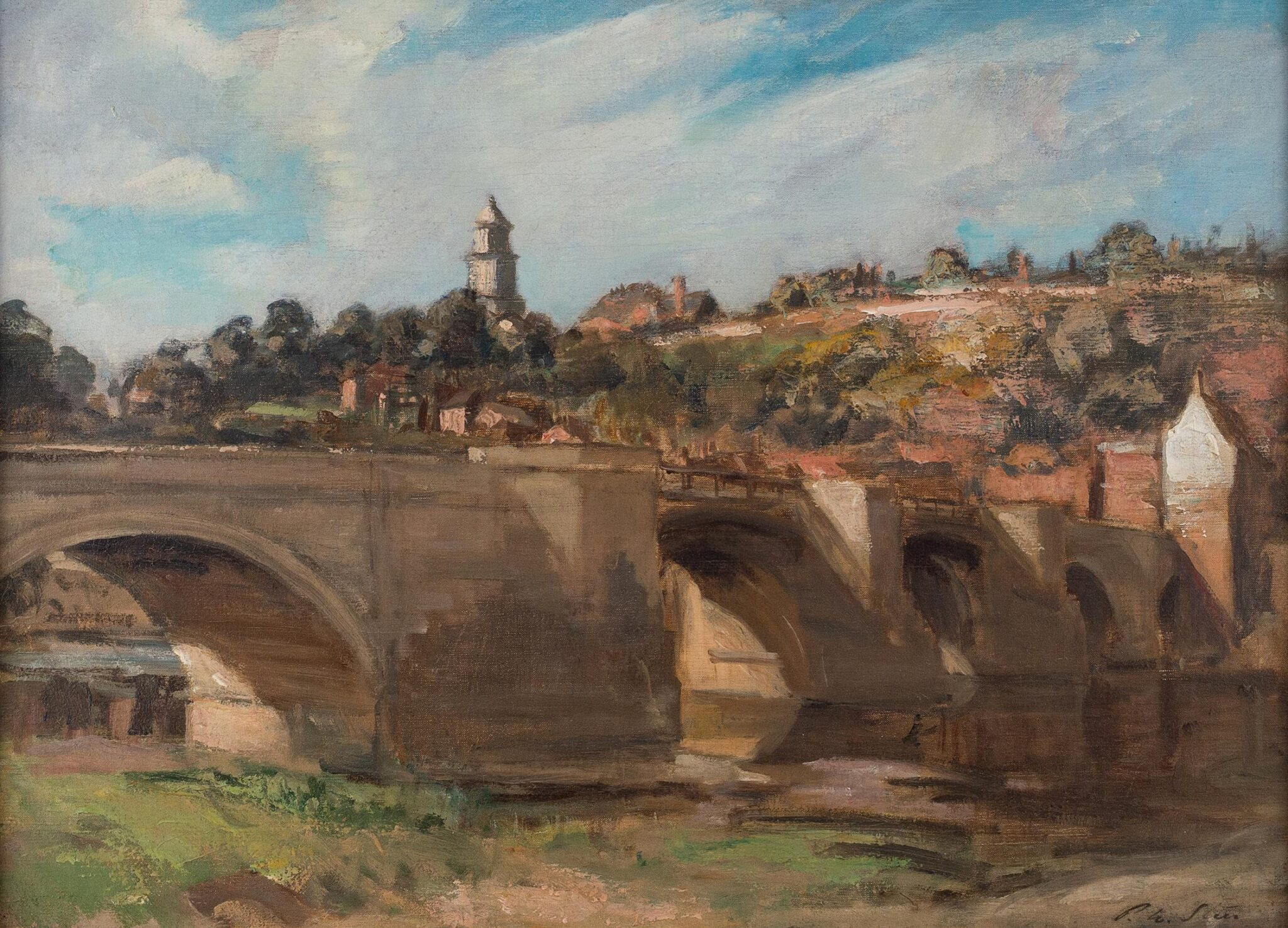
The Bridge, Bridgnorth, 1901

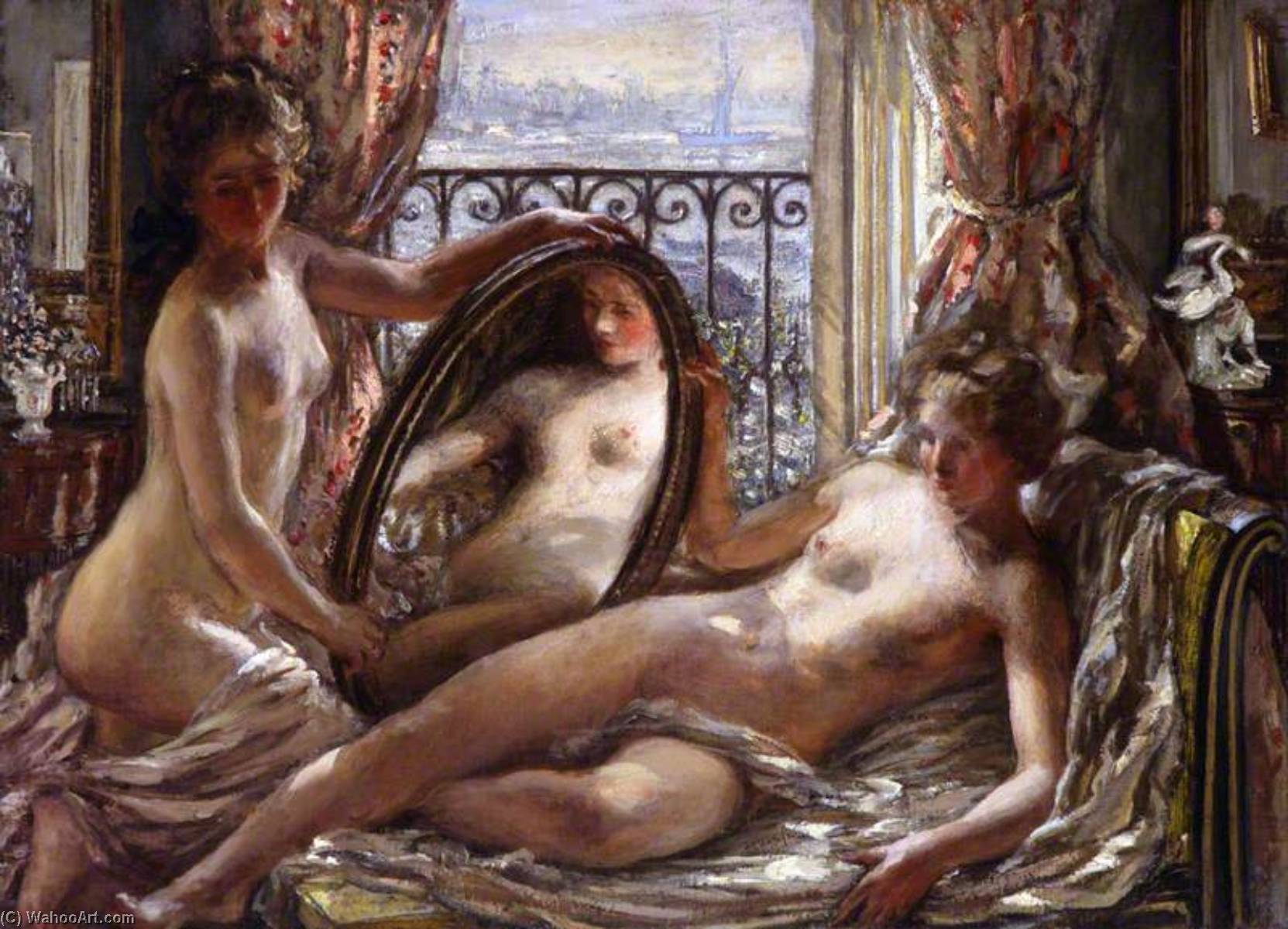
The Mirror, 1901

Richmond Castle, 1903

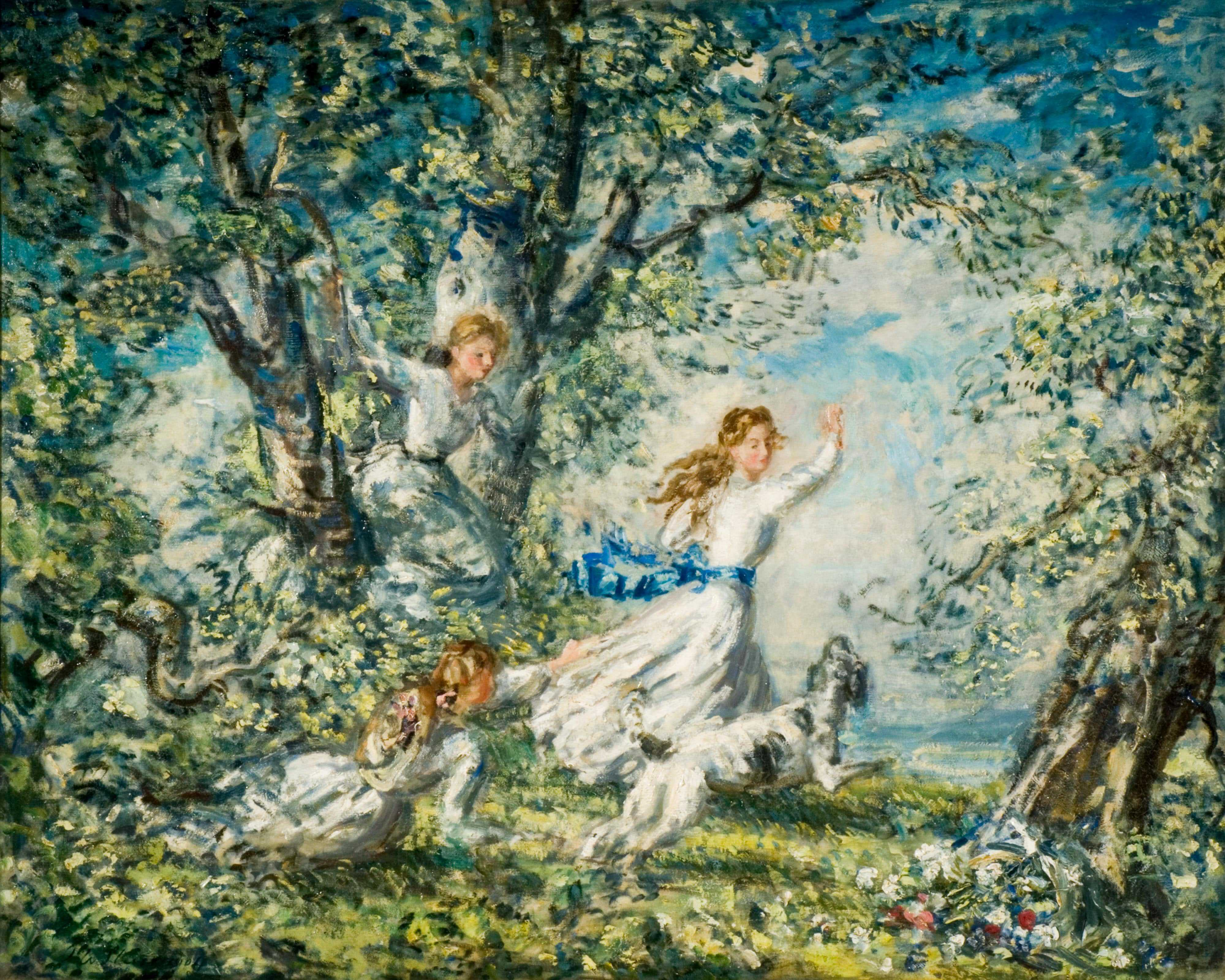
Springtime, 1904

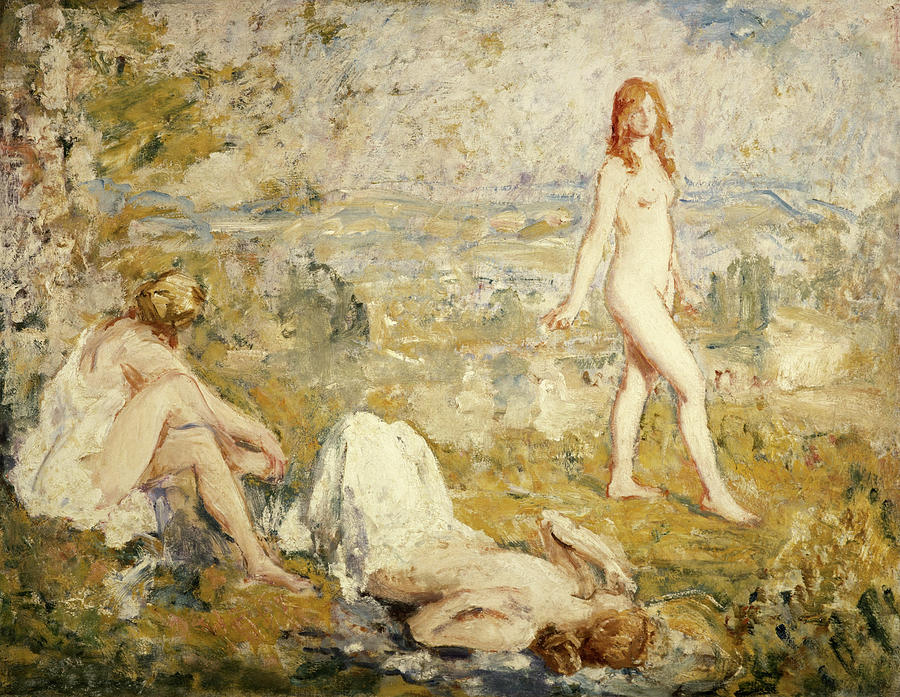
Three Girls Bathing, 1911

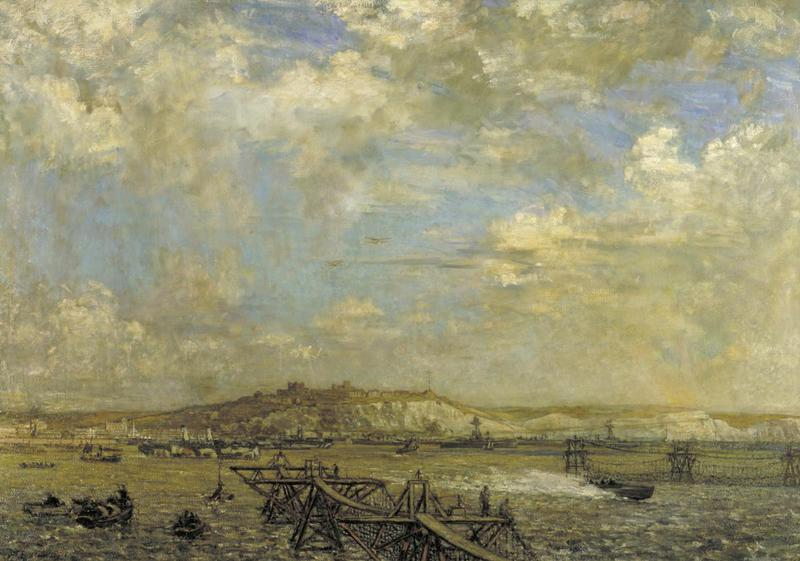
Dover Harbour, 1918

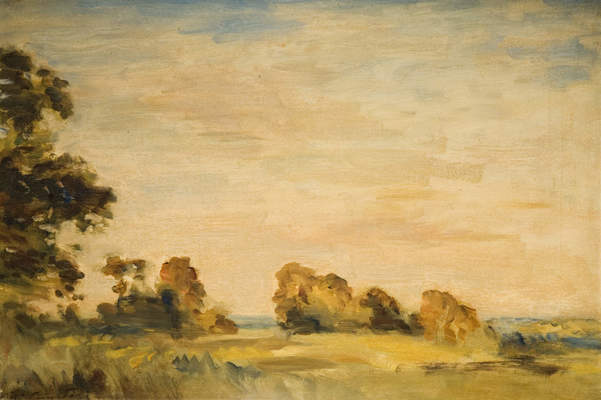
Brill, Buckinghamshire, 1923

== Note ==
Note: Encyclopædia Britannica Eleventh Edition of 1911 incorrectly refers to Philip Wilson Steer as Paul Wilson Steer.
