= Northern Mannerism =

Art movement

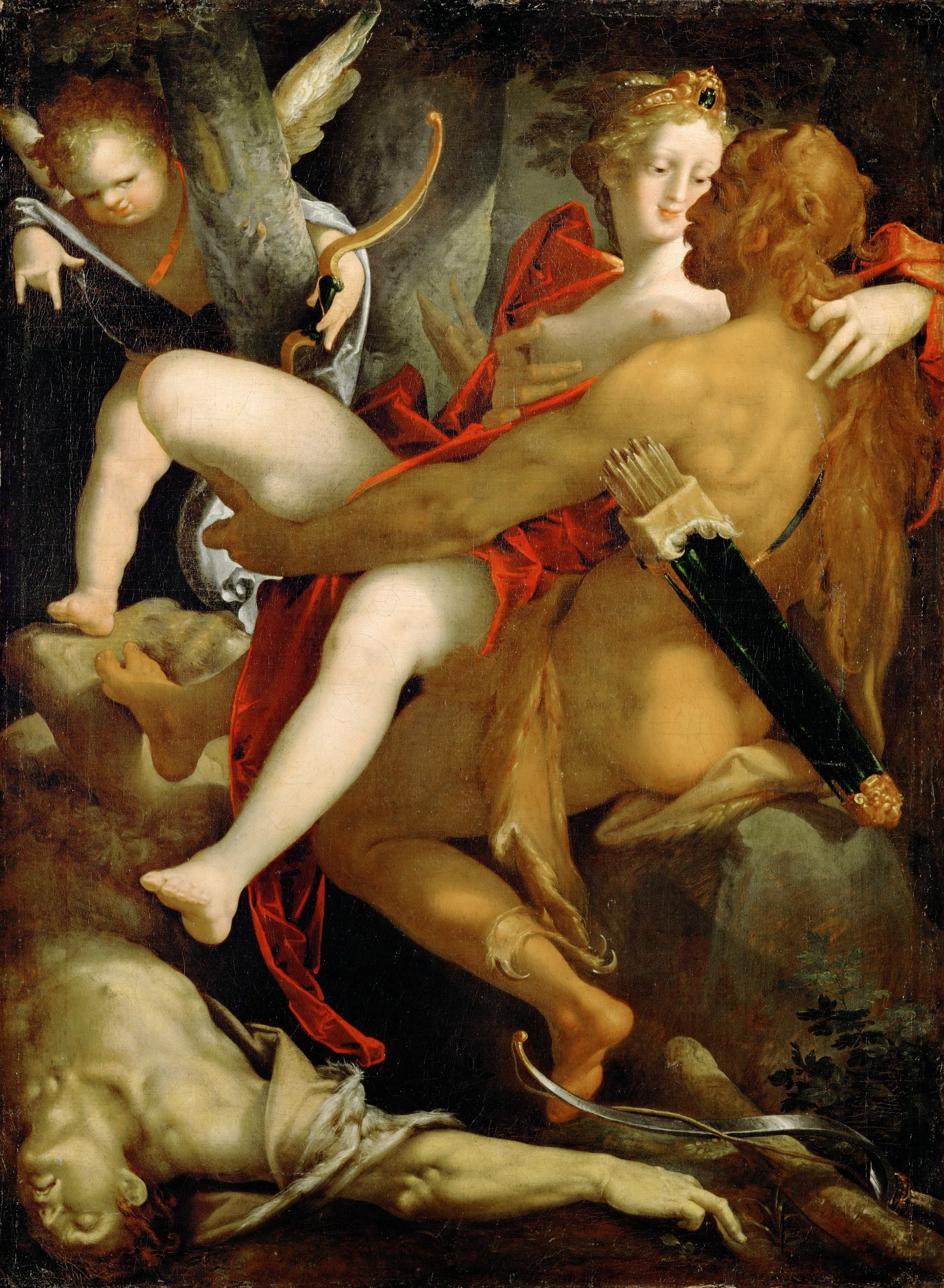
Bartholomeus Spranger, Hercules, Deianira and Nessus, 1580–85

Northern Mannerism is the form of Mannerism found in the visual arts north of the Alps in the 16th and early 17th centuries. Styles largely derived from Italian Mannerism were found in the Netherlands and elsewhere from around the mid-century, especially Mannerist ornament in architecture; this article concentrates on those times and places where Northern Mannerism generated its most original and distinctive work.

The three main centres of the style were in France, especially in the period 1530–1550, in Prague from 1576, and in the Netherlands from the 1580s—the first two phases very much led by royal patronage. In the last 15 years of the century, the style, by then becoming outdated in Italy, was widespread across northern Europe, spread in large part through prints. In painting, it tended to recede rapidly in the new century, under the new influence of Caravaggio and the early Baroque, but in architecture and the decorative arts, its influence was more sustained.

== Background ==
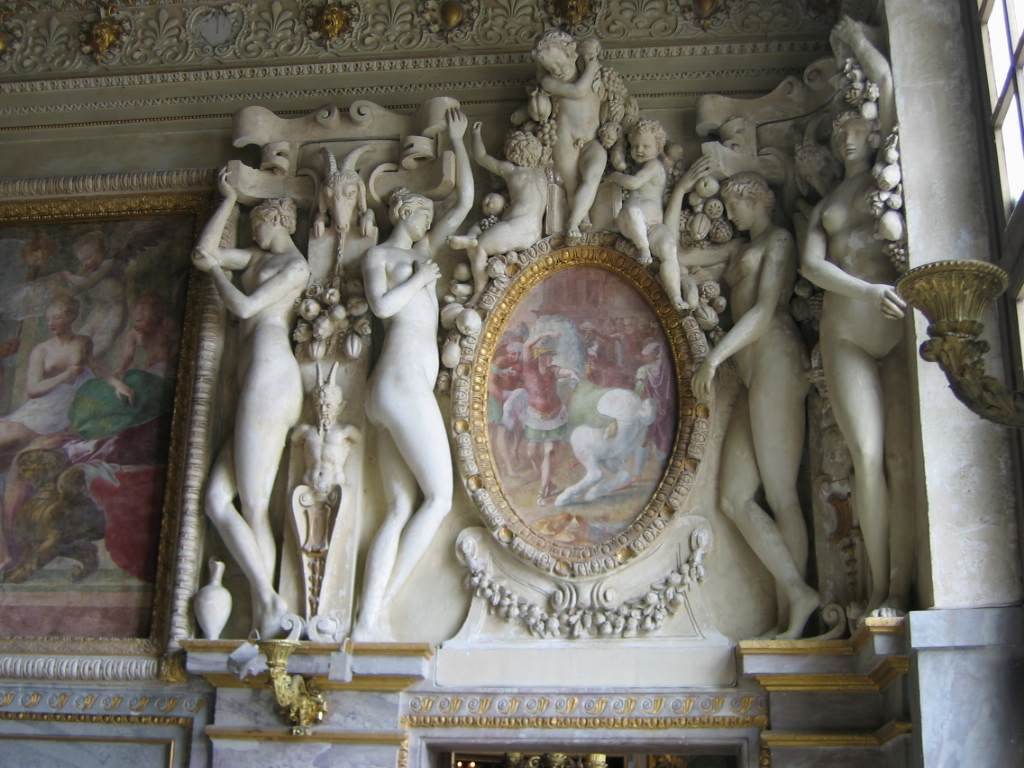
Stucco overdoor at Fontainebleau, probably designed by Primaticcio, who painted the oval inset

The sophisticated art of Italian Mannerism begins during the High Renaissance of the 1520s as a development of, a reaction against, and an attempt to excel, the serenely balanced triumphs of that style. As art historian Henri Zerner explains: "The concept of Mannerism—so important to modern criticism and notably to the renewed taste for Fontainebleau art—designates a style in opposition to the classicism of the Italian Renaissance embodied above all by Andrea del Sarto in Florence and Raphael in Rome".

The High Renaissance was a purely Italian phenomenon, and Italian Mannerism required both artists and an audience highly trained in the preceding Renaissance styles, whose conventions were often flouted in a knowing fashion. In Northern Europe, however, such artists, and such an audience, could hardly be found. The prevailing style remained Gothic, and different syntheses of this and Italian styles were made in the first decades of the 16th century by more internationally aware artists such as Albrecht Dürer, Hans Burgkmair and others in Germany, and the misleadingly named school of Antwerp Mannerism, in fact unrelated to, and preceding, Italian Mannerism. Romanism was more thoroughly influenced by Italian art of the High Renaissance, and aspects of Mannerism, and many of its leading exponents had travelled to Italy. Netherlandish painting had been generally the most advanced in northern Europe since before 1400, and the best Netherlandish artists were better able than those of other regions to keep up with Italian developments, though lagging at a distance.

For each succeeding generations of artists, the problem became more acute, as much Northern work continued to gradually assimilate aspects of Renaissance style, while the most advanced Italian art had spiralled into an atmosphere of self-conscious sophistication and complexity that must have seemed a world apart to Northern patrons and artists, but enjoyed a reputation and prestige that could not be ignored.

== France ==
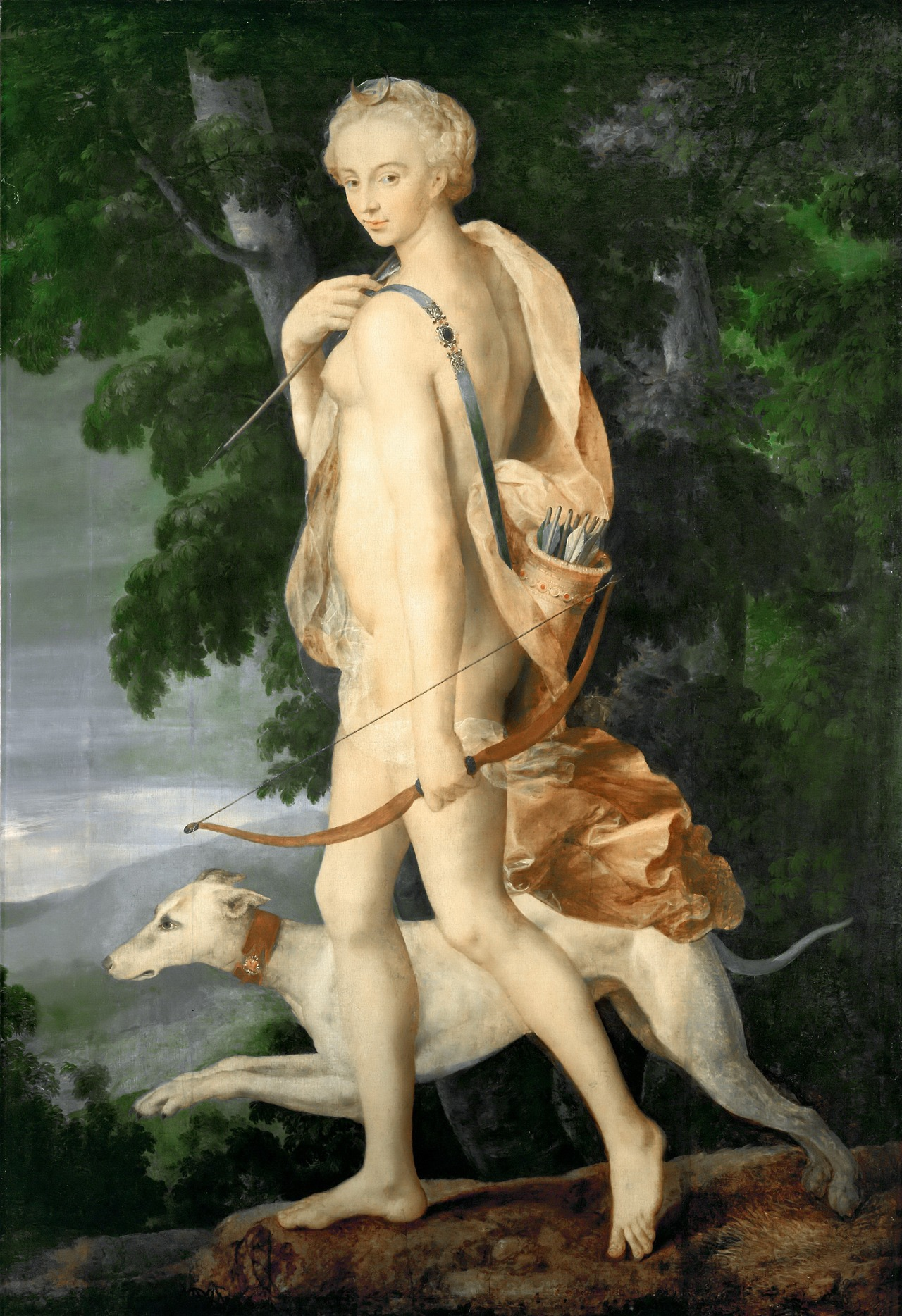
Diana the Huntress, School of Fontainebleau, 1550s

France received a direct injection of Italian style in the form of the first School of Fontainebleau, where from 1530 several Florentine artists of quality were hired to decorate the royal Palace of Fontainebleau, with some French assistants being taken on. The most notable imports were Rosso Fiorentino (Giovanni Battista di Jacopo di Gaspare, 1494–1540), Francesco Primaticcio (c. 1505–1570), Niccolò dell'Abbate (c. 1509–1571), all of whom remained in France until their deaths. This conjunction succeeded in generating a native French style with strong Mannerist elements that was then able to develop largely on its own. Jean Cousin the Elder, for example, produced paintings, such as Eva Prima Pandora and Charity, that, with their sinuous, elongated nudes, drew palpably upon the artistic principles of the Fontainebleau school.

Cousin's son Jean the Younger, most of whose works have not survived, and Antoine Caron both followed in this tradition, producing an agitated version of the Mannerist aesthetic in the context of the French Wars of Religion. The iconography of figurative works was mostly mythological, with a strong emphasis on Diana, goddess of the hunting that was the original function of Fontainebleau, and namesake of Diane de Poitiers, mistress and muse of Henry II, and keen huntress herself. Her slim, long-legged and athletic figure "became fixed in the erotic imaginary".

Other parts of Northern Europe did not have the advantage of such intense contact with Italian artists, but the Mannerist style made its presence felt through prints and illustrated books, the purchases of Italian works by rulers and others, artists' travels to Italy, and the example of individual Italian artists working in the North.

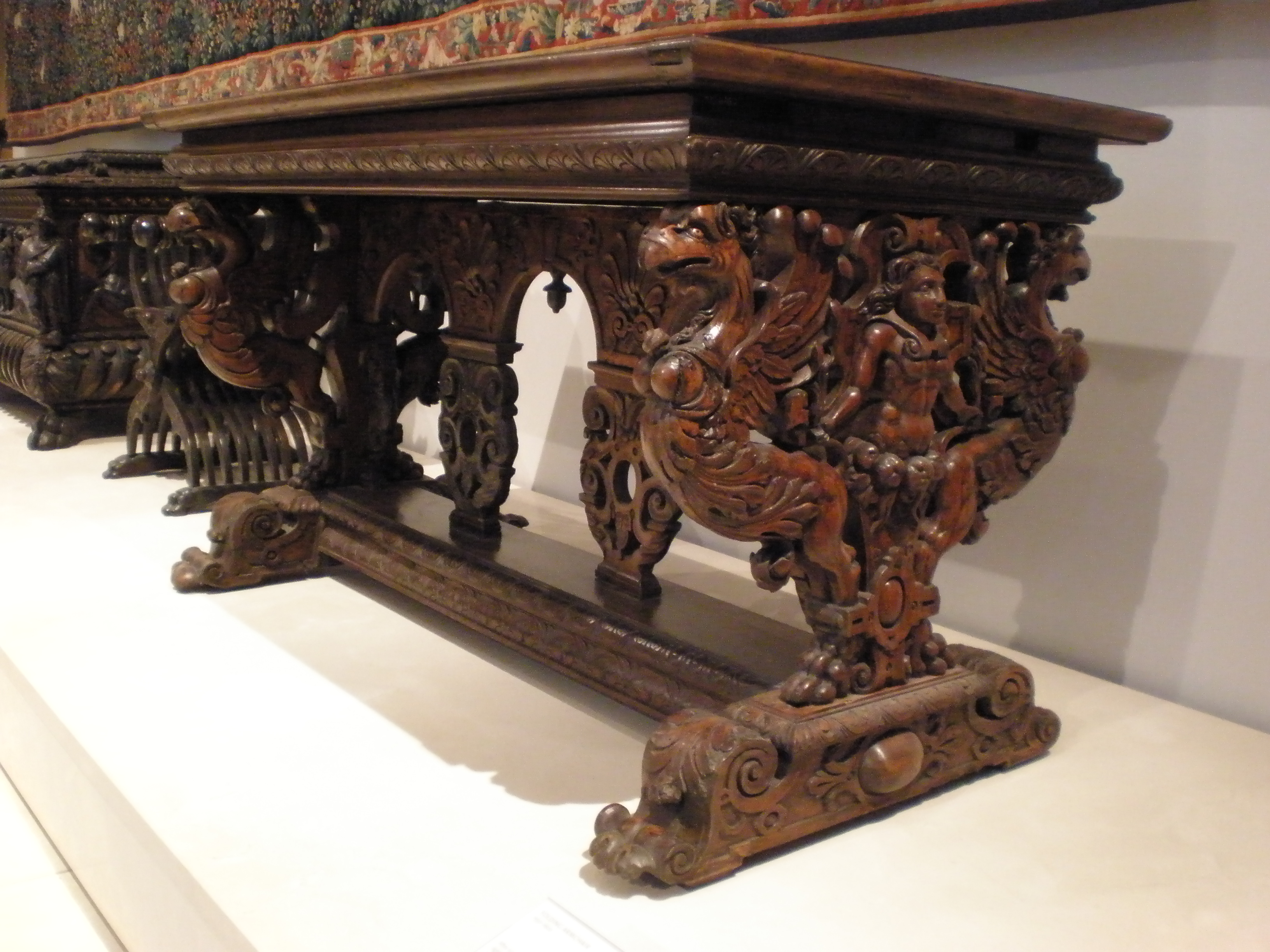
French or Burgundian table in walnut, 2nd half of the 16th century

Much of the most important work at Fontainebleau was in the form of stucco reliefs, often executed by French artists to drawings by the Italians (and then reproduced in prints), and the Fontainebleau style affected French sculpture more strongly than French painting. The huge stucco frames which dominate their inset paintings with bold high-relief strapwork, swags of fruit, and generous staffage of naked nymph-like figures, were very influential on the vocabulary of Mannerist ornament all over Europe, spread by ornament books and prints by Androuet du Cerceau and others—Rosso seems to have been the originator of the style.

A number of areas in the decorative arts joined in the style, especially where there were customers from the court. High-style walnut furniture made in metropolitan centers like Paris and Dijon, employed strapwork framing and sculptural supports in dressoirs and buffets. The mysterious and sophisticated Saint-Porchaire ware, of which only about sixty pieces survive, brought a similar aesthetic into pottery, and much of it carries royal cyphers. This was followed by the "rustic" pottery of Bernard Palissy, with vessels covered in elaborately modelled relief animals and plants. Painted Limoges enamel adopted the style with enthusiasm around 1540, and many workshops produced highly detailed painting until about the 1580s.

Apart from the Palace of Fontainebleau itself, other important buildings decorated in the style were the Château d'Anet (1547–52) for Diane de Poitiers, and parts of the Palais du Louvre. Catherine de' Medici's patronage of the arts promoted the Mannerist style, except in portraiture, and her court festivities were the only regular northern ones to rival the intermedios and entries of the Medici court in Florence; all of which relied heavily on the visual arts. After an interlude when work on Fontainebleau was abandoned at the height of the French Wars of Religion, a "Second School of Fontainebleau" was formed from local artists in the 1590s.

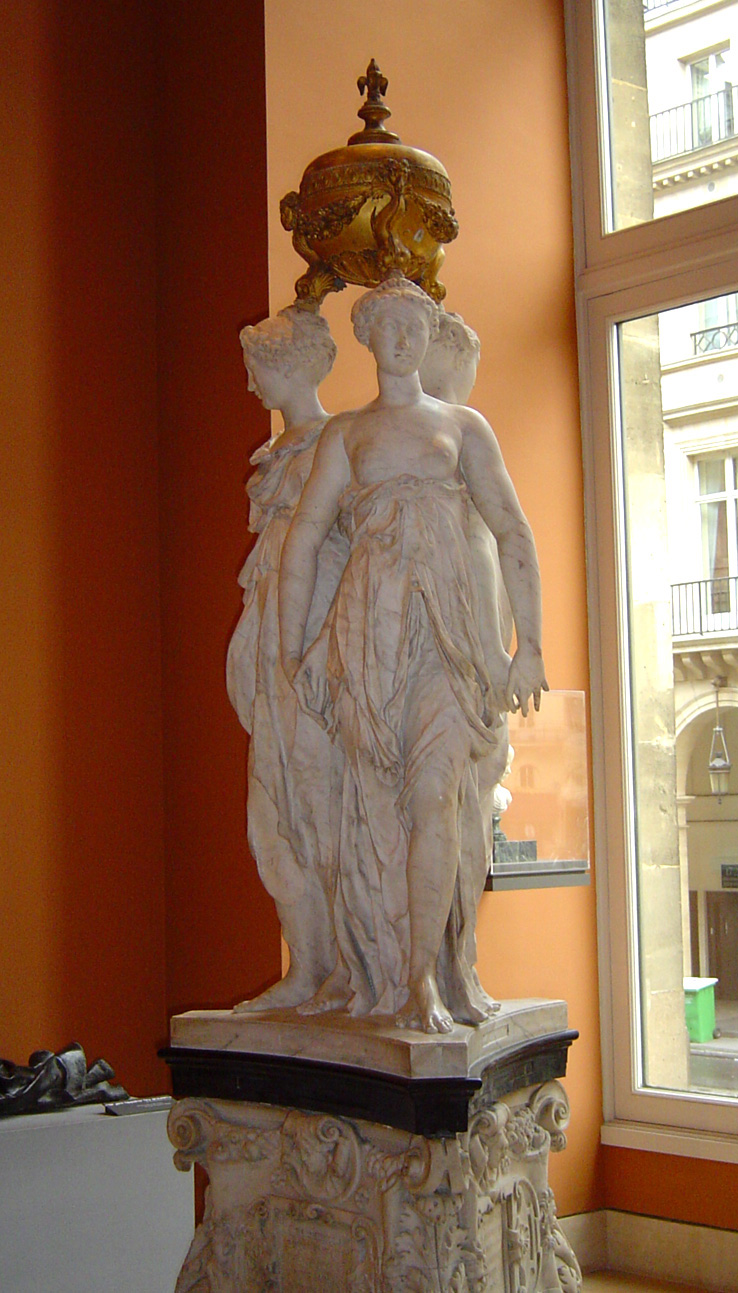
Monument containing the heart of Henry II of France, Germain Pilon

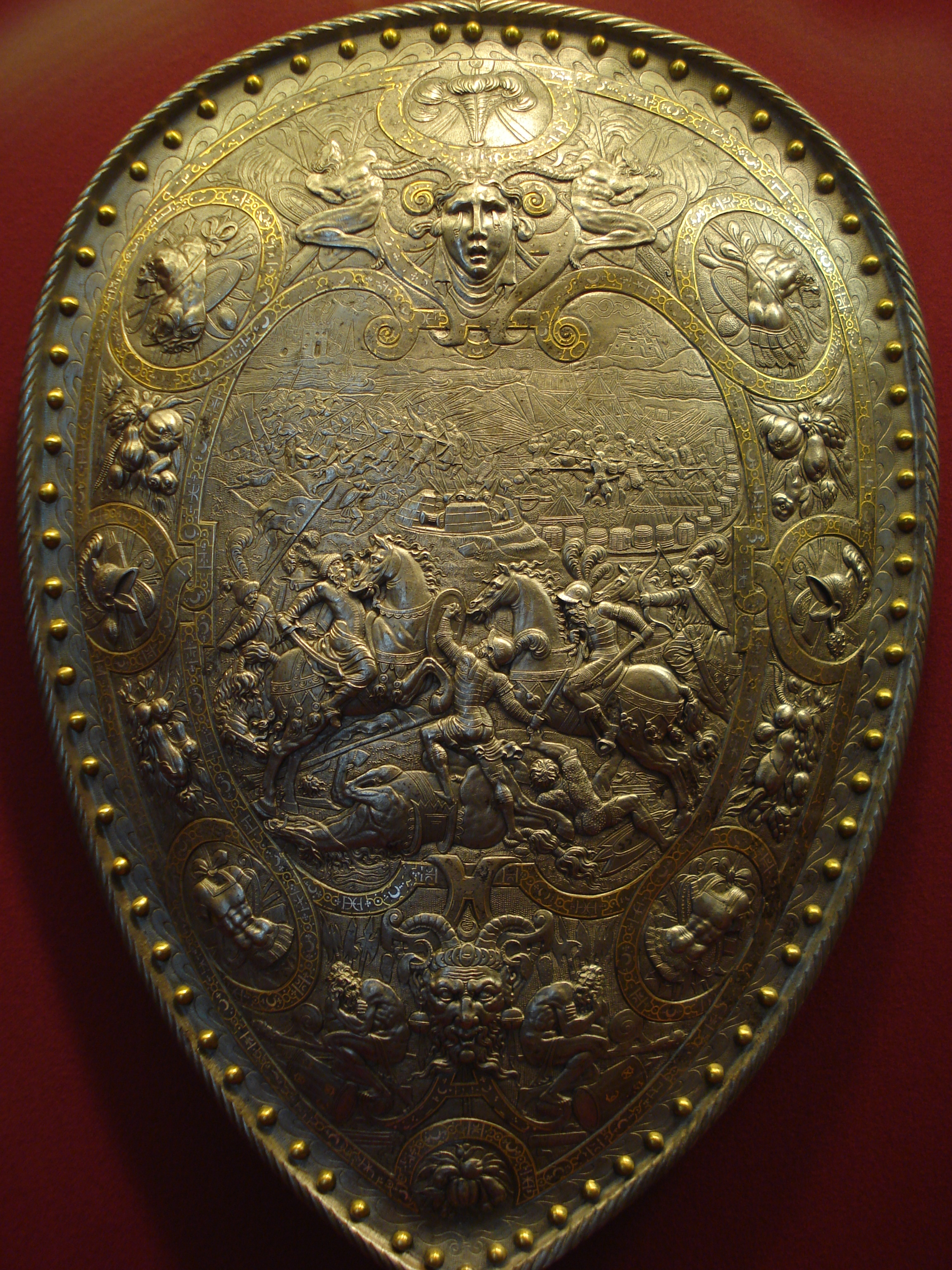
Shield of Henry II of France, steel damascened in silver and gold, design attributed to Etienne Delaune

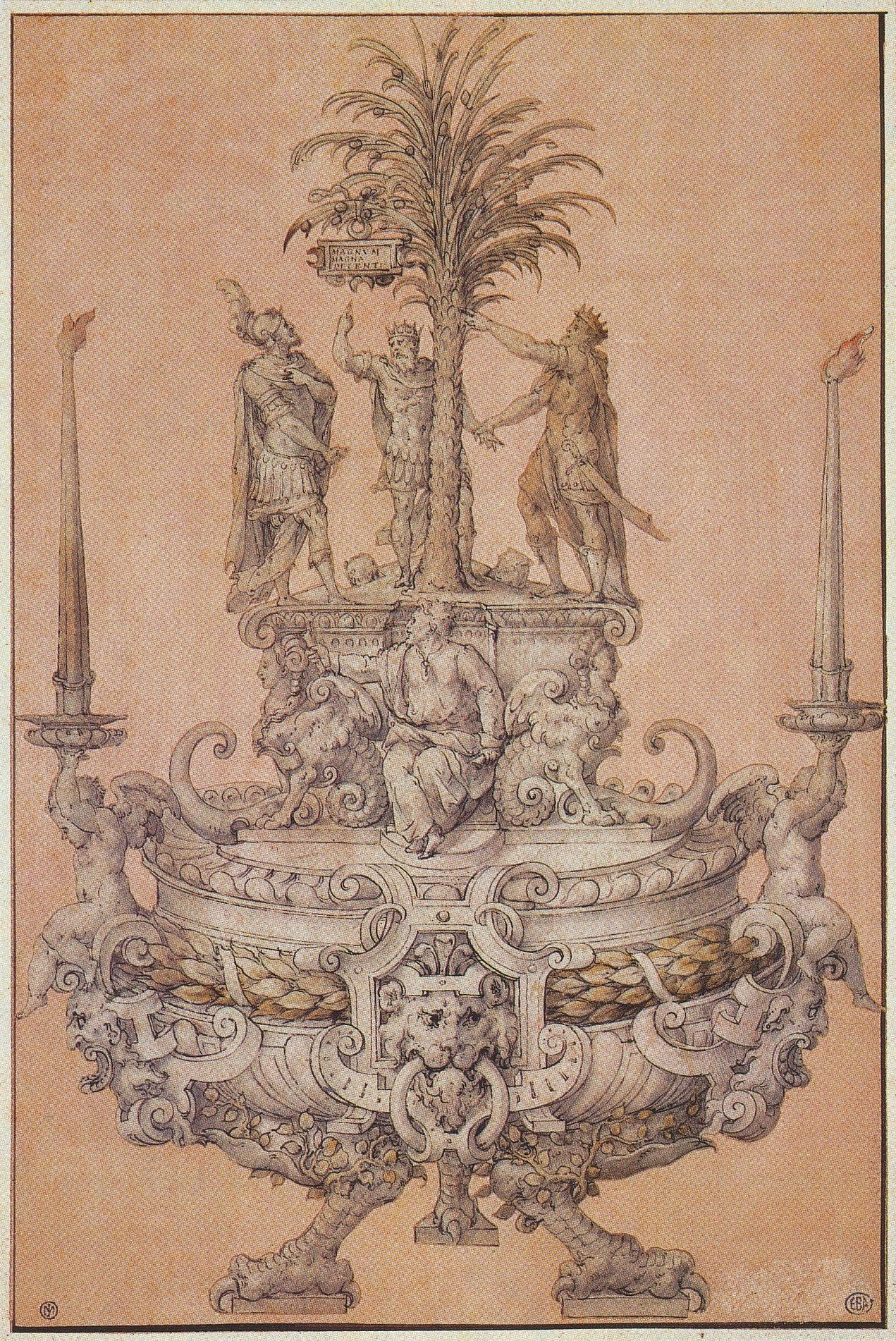
"Design for a Vessel Presented to Henry II", Jean Cousin the Elder, 1549

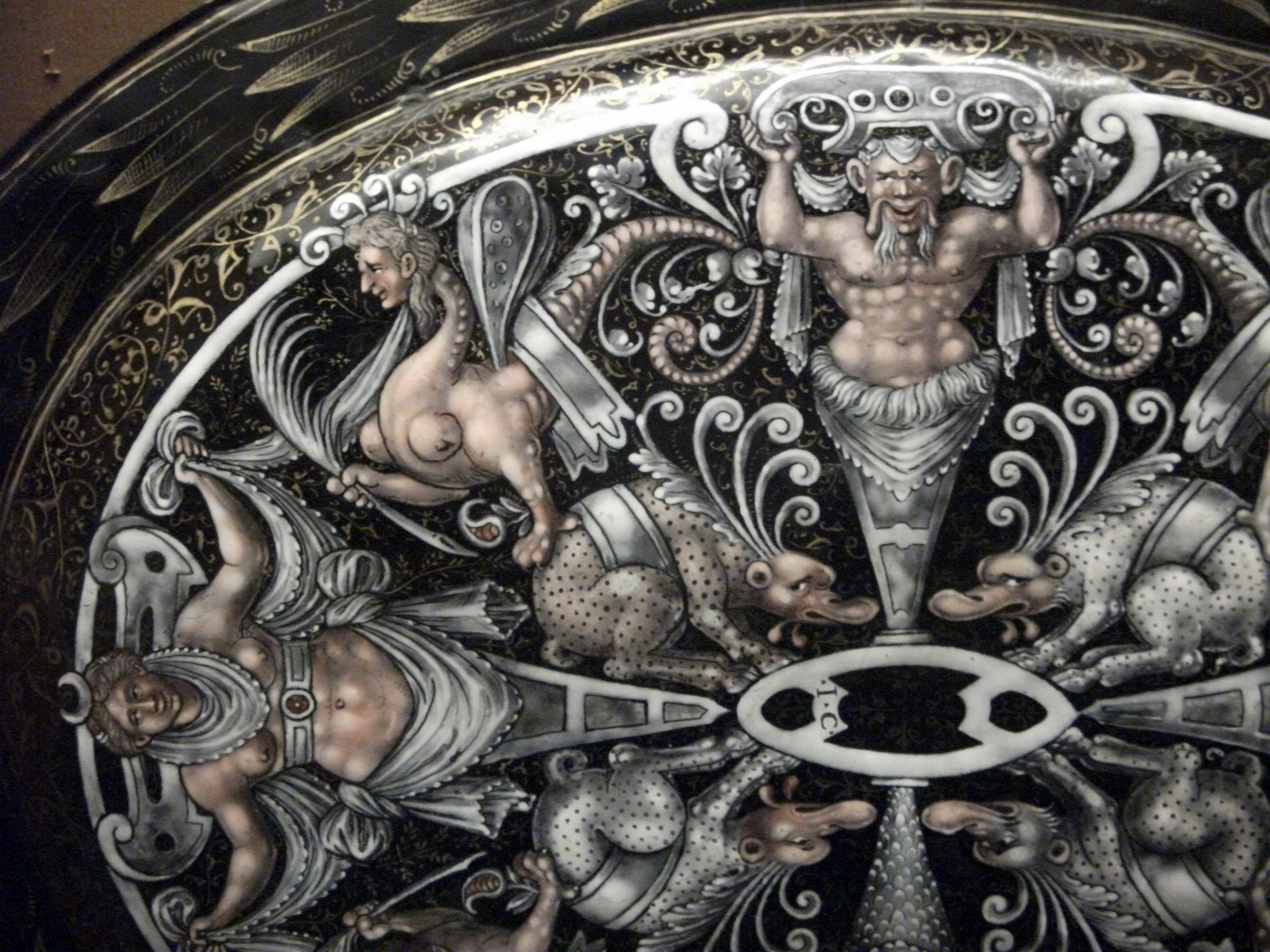
Detail of dish in Limoges enamel, mid-16th century, attributed to Jean de Court

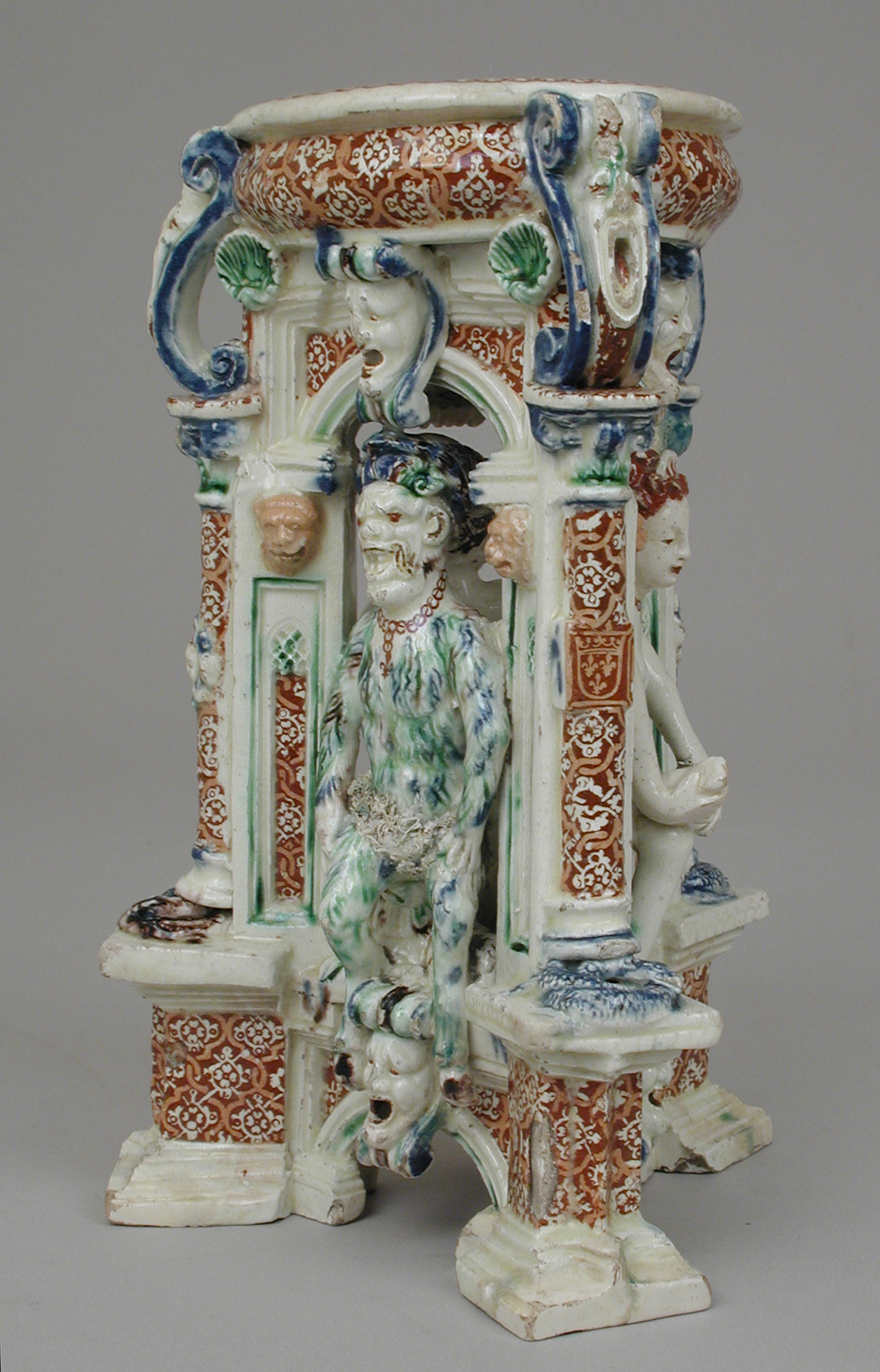
Saint-Porchaire ware, triangular salt, 1540s?, 6 7/8 in. (17.5 cm) high, with a (?) satyr, and (?) Venus at right

== Prague under Rudolf II ==
Vertumnus by Giuseppe Arcimboldo, a portrait depicting Rudolf II, Holy Roman Emperor painted as Vertumnus, the Roman God of the seasons, c. 1590–91. Skokloster Castle, Sweden

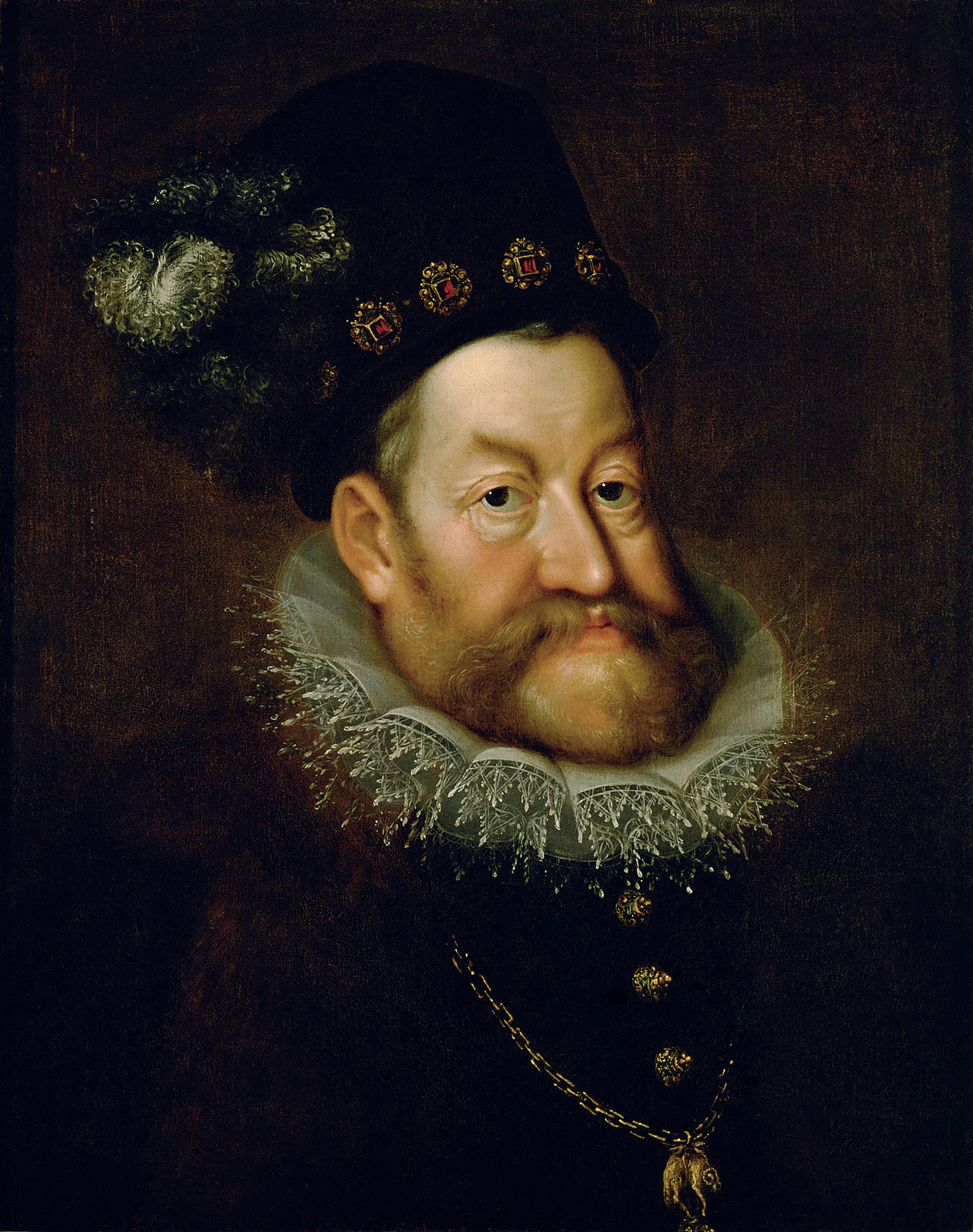
Portrait of Emperor Rudolf II, c. 1607, by Hans von Aachen

Maximilian II, Holy Roman Emperor (reigned 1564–1576), who made his base in Vienna, had humanist and artistic tastes, and patronised a number of artists, mostly famously Giambologna and Giuseppe Arcimboldo, whose fantasy portraits made up of objects were slightly more serious in the world of late-Renaissance philosophy than they seem now. At the end of his reign he devised a project for a new palace and just before he died the young Flemish painter Bartholomeus Spranger had been summoned from Rome, where he had made a successful career. Maximilian's son, Rudolf II, Holy Roman Emperor was to prove an even better patron than his father would have been, and Spranger never left his service. The court soon transferred to Prague, safer from the regular Turkish invasions, and during his reign of 1576–1612 Rudolf was to become an obsessive collector of old and new art, his artists mixing with the astronomers, clockmakers, botanists, and "wizards, alchemists and kabbalists" whom Rudolf also gathered around him.

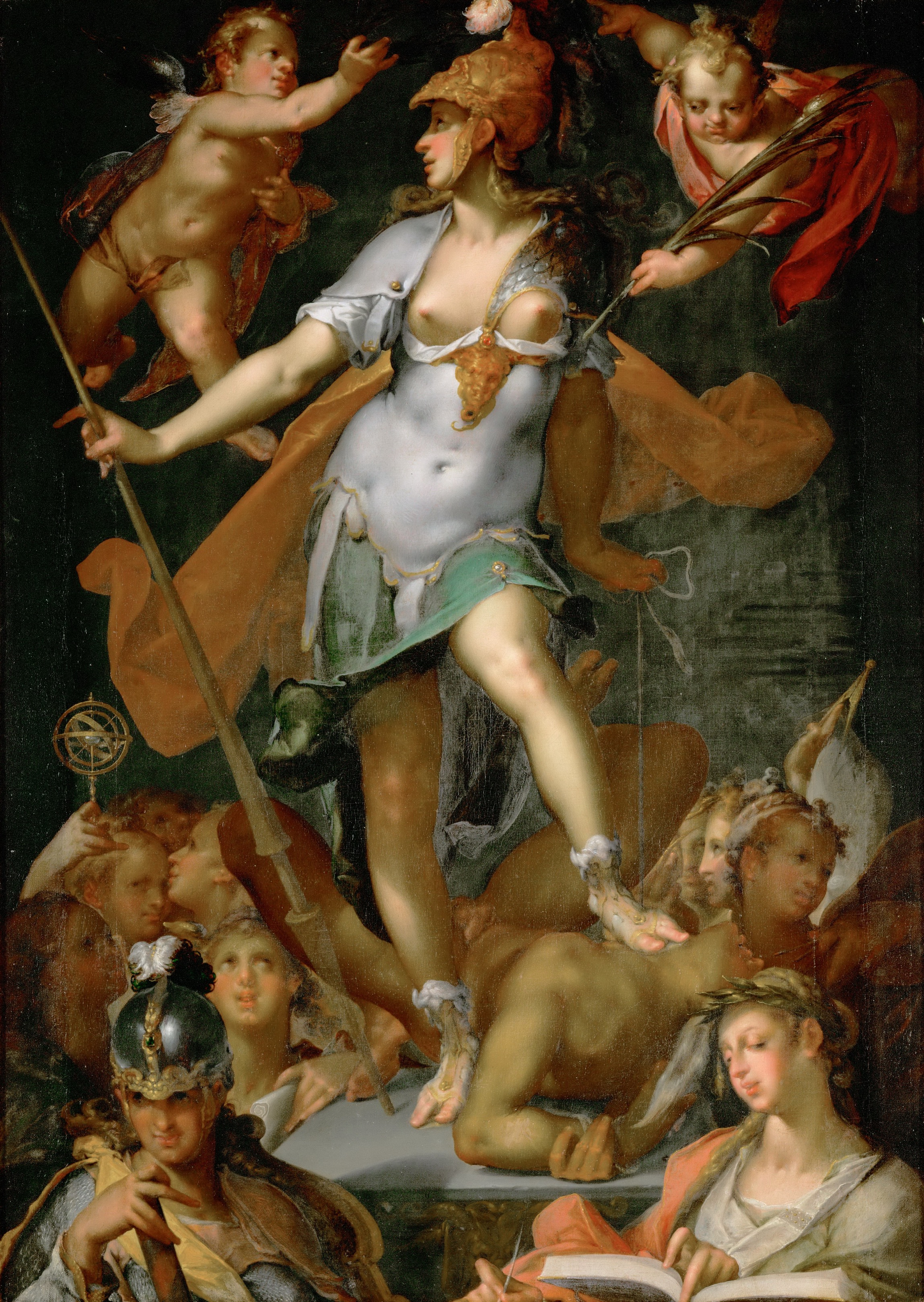
Bartholomeus Spranger, Minerva triumphs over Ignorance, 1591, "an astonishing makeover ... [Minerva] never looks as glamorous anywhere else".

Rudolf's artistic preferences were for mythological scenes with nudes as well as allegorical propaganda pieces which extolled the virtues of himself as ruler. A work combining the elements of eroticism and propaganda is Minerva triumphs over Ignorance (Kunsthistorisches Museum), which shows Minverva (the Roman goddess of war, wisdom, arts and trade) with exposed breasts and a helmet treading down Ignorance, symbolised by a man with the ears of an ass. Bellona, another Roman goddess of war, and the nine Muses surround Minerva. The propaganda message is that the empire is safe with Rudolf at the helm so that the arts and trade can flourish. The Flemish sculptor Hans Mont also worked for Rudolf and designed the triumphal arch for Rudolf II's formal entry into Vienna in 1576.

Works from Rudolf's Prague were highly finished and refined, with most paintings being relatively small. The elongation of figures and strikingly complex poses of the first wave of Italian Mannerism were continued, and the elegant distance of Bronzino's figures was mediated through the works of the absent Giambologna, who represented the ideal of the style.

Prints were essential to disseminate the style to Europe, Germany and the Low Countries in particular, and some printmakers, like the greatest of the period, Hendrick Goltzius, worked from drawings sent from Prague, while others, like Aegidius Sadeler who lived in Spranger's house, had been tempted to the city itself. Rudolf also commissioned work from Italy, above all from Giambologna, who the Medicis would not allow to leave Florence, and four great mythological allegories were sent by Paolo Veronese. The Emperor's influence affected art in other German courts, notably Munich and Dresden, where the goldsmith and artist Johann Kellerthaler was based.

Rudolf was not very interested in religion, and "in the Prague of Rudolf II, an explosion of mythological imagery was produced that had not been seen since Fontainebleau". Goddesses were usually naked, or nearly so, and a more overt atmosphere of eroticism prevails than is found in most Renaissance mythological works, evidently reflecting Rudolf's "special interests".

The dominating figure was Hercules, identified with the emperor, as he had earlier been with earlier Habsburg and Valois monarchs. But the other gods were not neglected; their conjunctions and transformations had significance in Renaissance Neo-Platonism and Hermeticism that were taken more seriously in Rudolf's Prague than any other Renaissance court. It seems, however, that the painted allegories from Prague contain neither very specific complicated meanings, nor hidden recipes for alchemy. Giambologna frequently chose, or let someone else choose, a title for his sculptures after their completion; for him it was only the forms that mattered.

=== Influence of Prague elsewhere ===
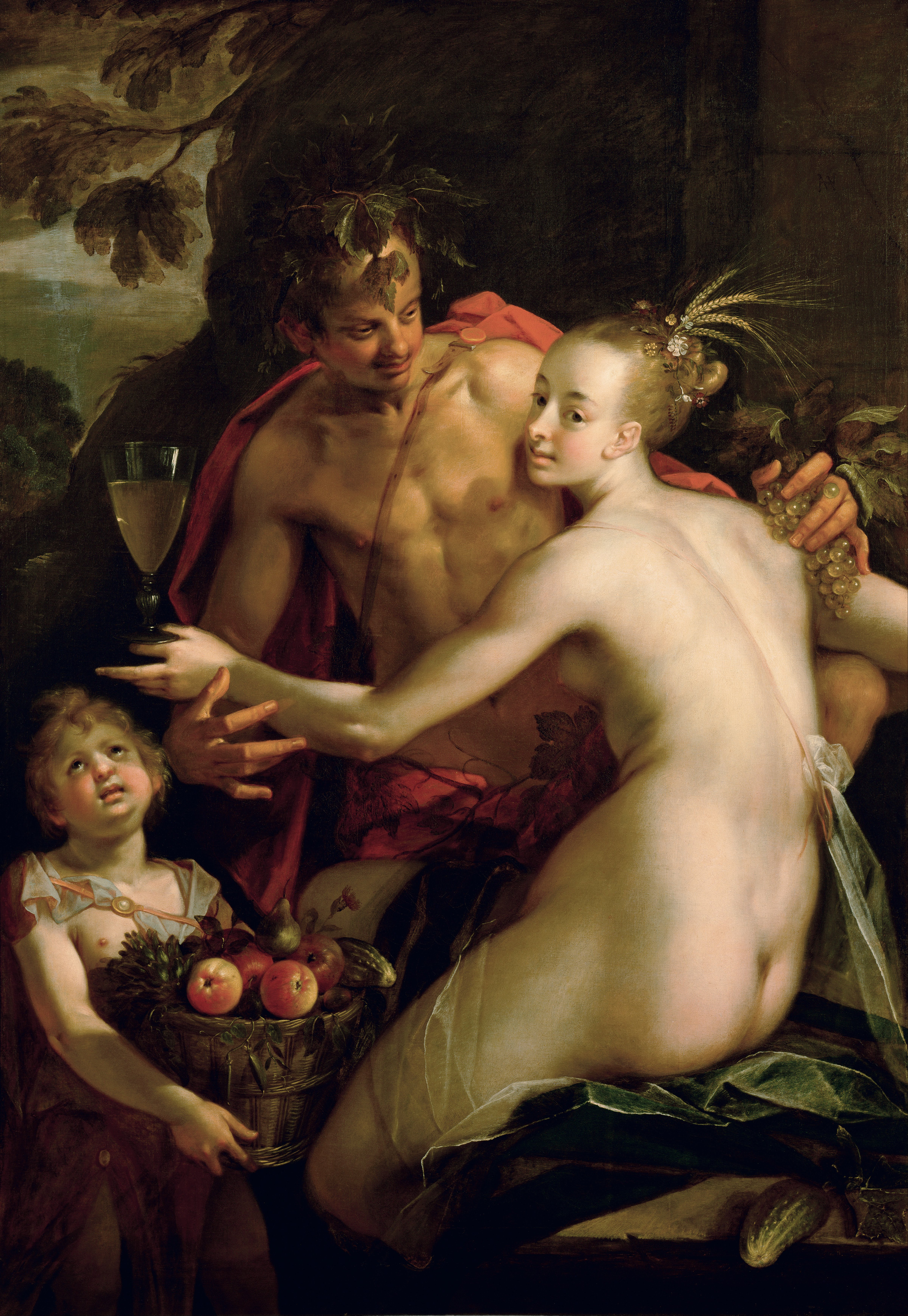
Bacchus, Ceres and Amor (Sine Cerere et Baccho friget Venus), c. 1600, by Hans von Aachen

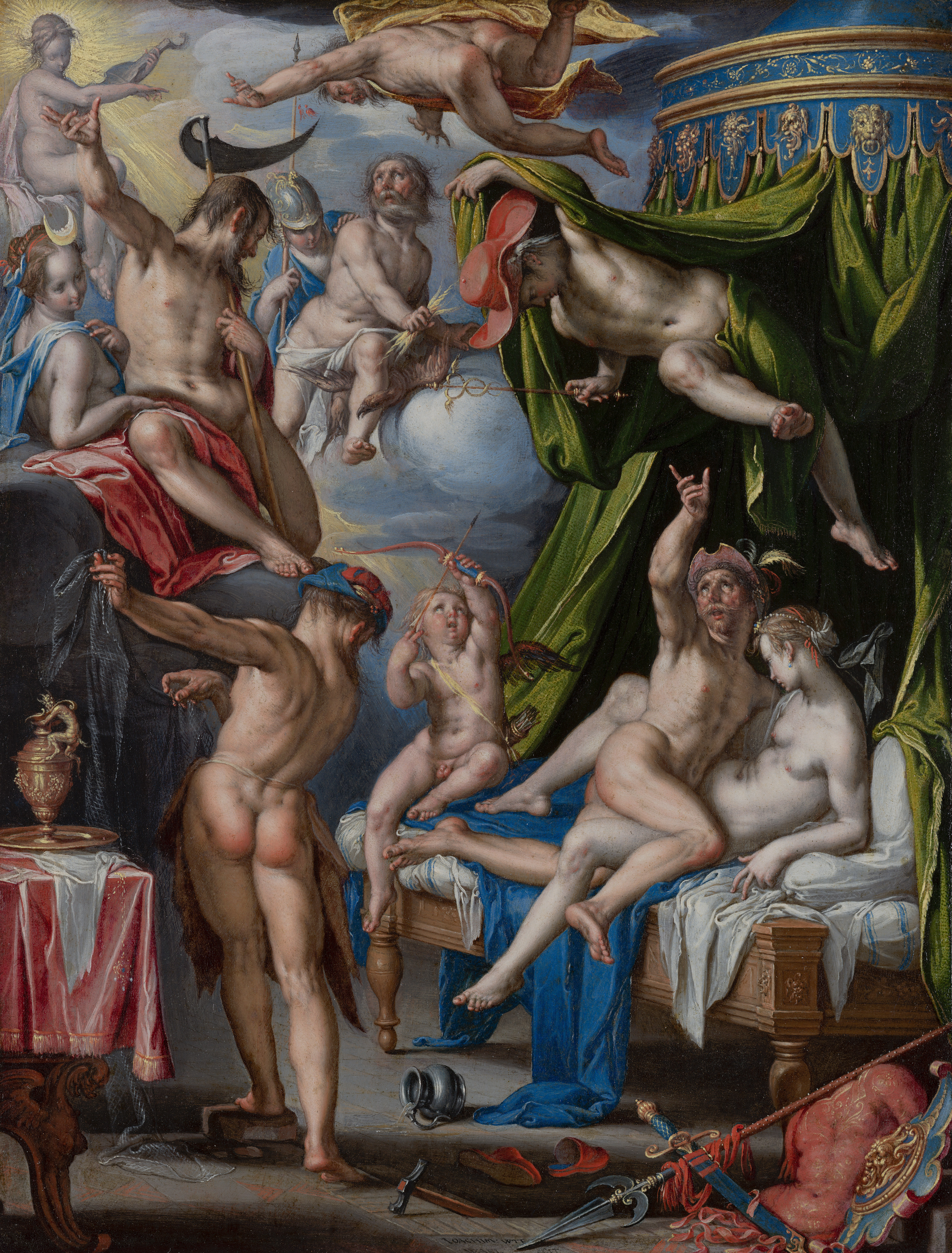
Utrecht – Joachim Wtewael, Venus and Mars surprised by Vulcan, 1601, 21 x 16 cm on copper.

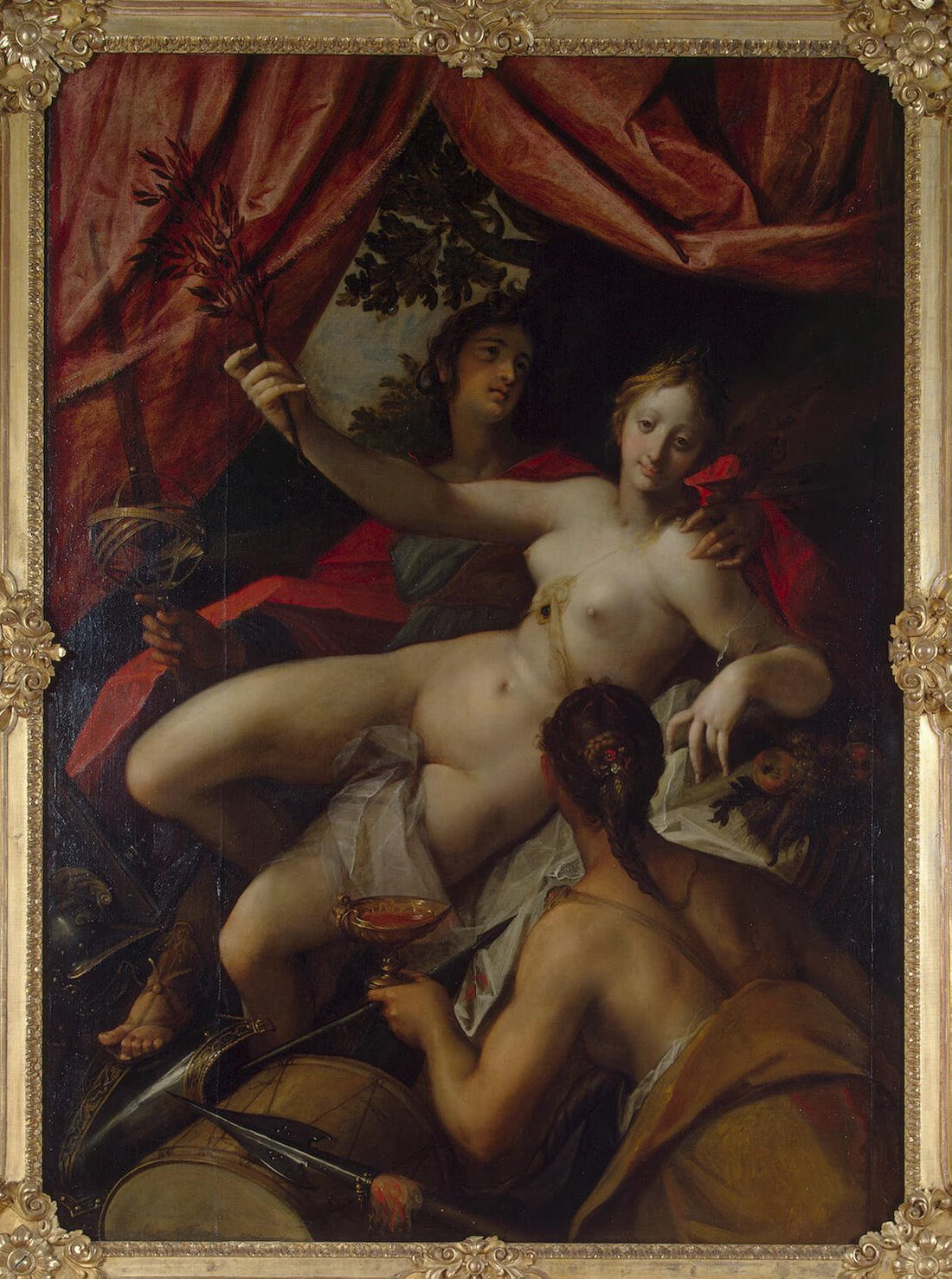
Hans von Aachen, Allegory of Peace and the Arts, 1602.

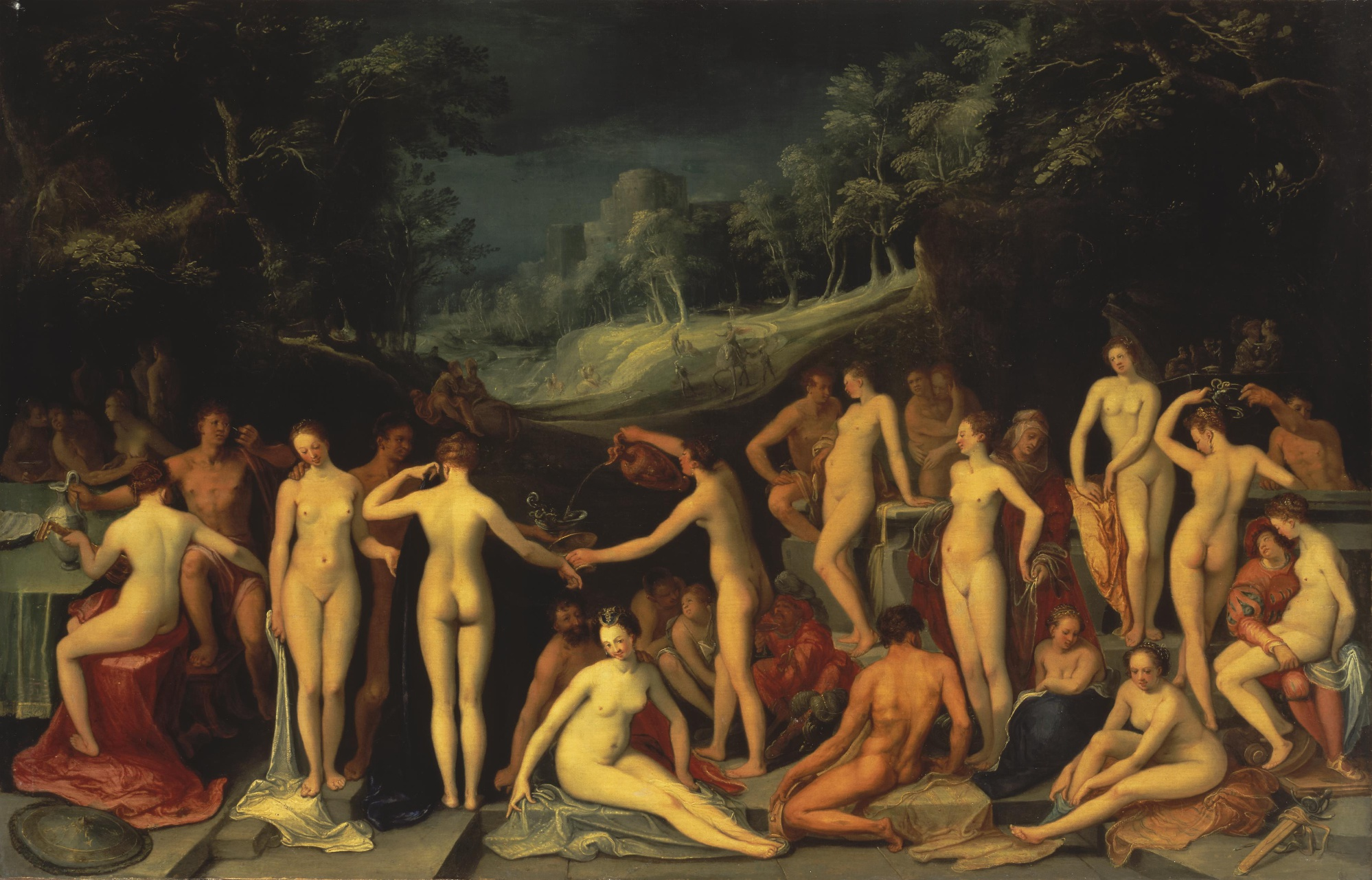
Haarlem – Karel van Mander, Garden of Love, 1602

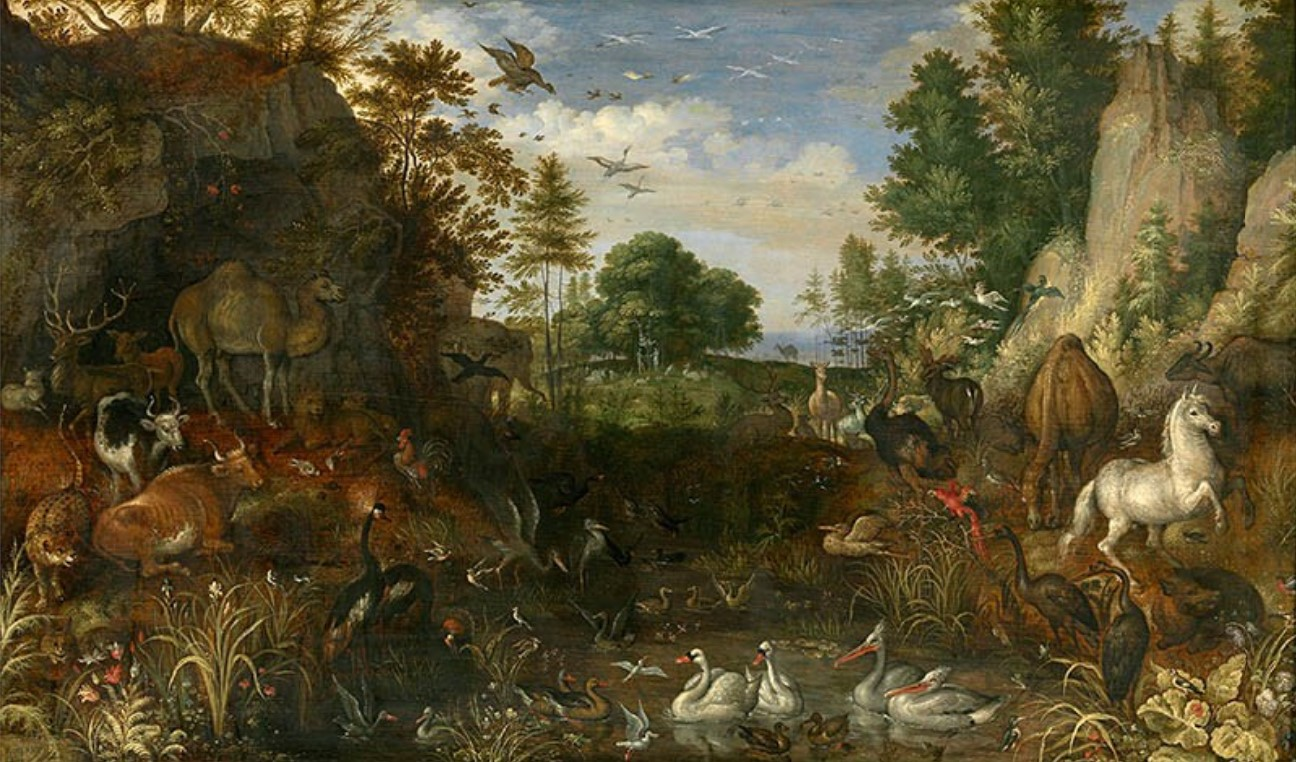
Haarlem – Roelant Savery, Garden of Eden, a typical subject, 1622. Rudolf also had large menageries, including a dodo, seen in many paintings.

== Netherlands Mannerism ==
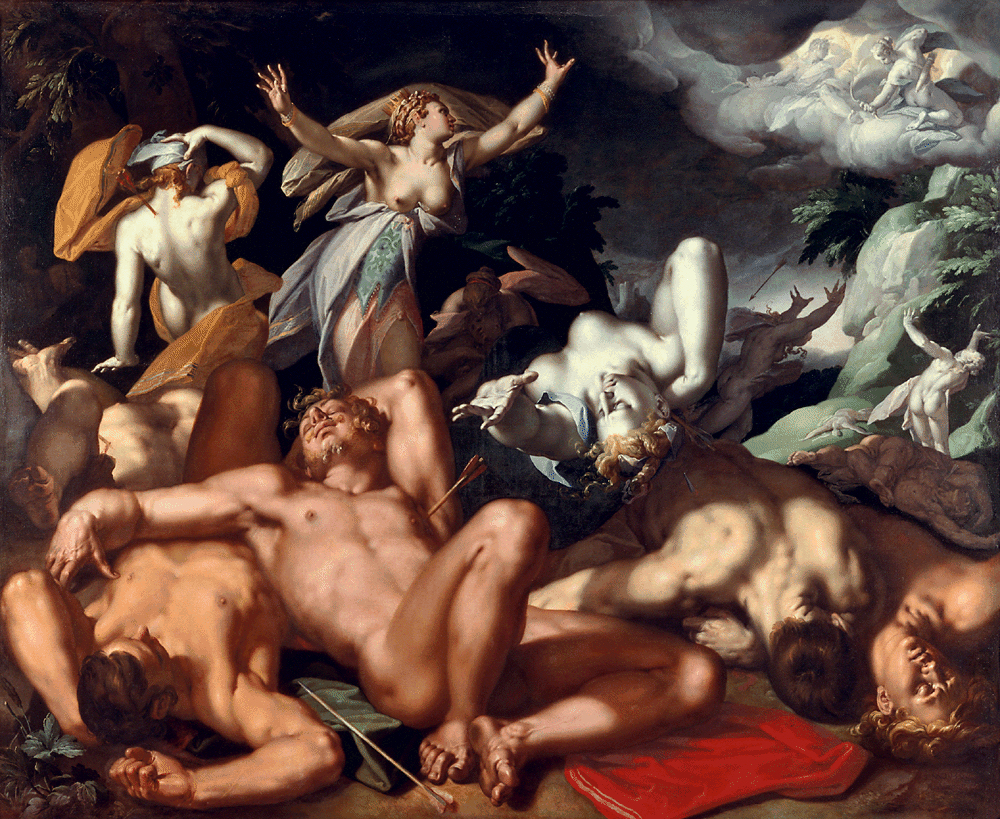
Abraham Bloemaert, Niobe mourning her children, 1591

Whereas the artists of both Fontainebleau and Prague were mostly provided with a home so congenial in both intellectual and physical terms that they stayed to the end of their lives, for artists of the last Netherlandish phase of the movement Mannerism was very often a phase through which they passed before moving on to a style influenced by Caravaggio.

For Hendrick Goltzius, the greatest printmaker of the day, his most Mannerist phase under the influence of Spranger only lasted for the five years between 1585, when he engraved his first print after one of the Spranger drawings brought from Prague by Karel van Mander, to his trip to Rome in 1590, from which he "returned a changed artist. From this time on he no longer made prints after Spranger's extravaganzas. The monstrous muscle-men and over-elongated female nudes with tiny heads ... were replaced by figures with more normal proportions and movements." Spranger's work "had a wide and immediate effect in the Northern Netherlands", and the group known as the "Haarlem Mannerists", principally Goltzius, van Mander, and Cornelis van Haarlem was matched by artists in other cities.

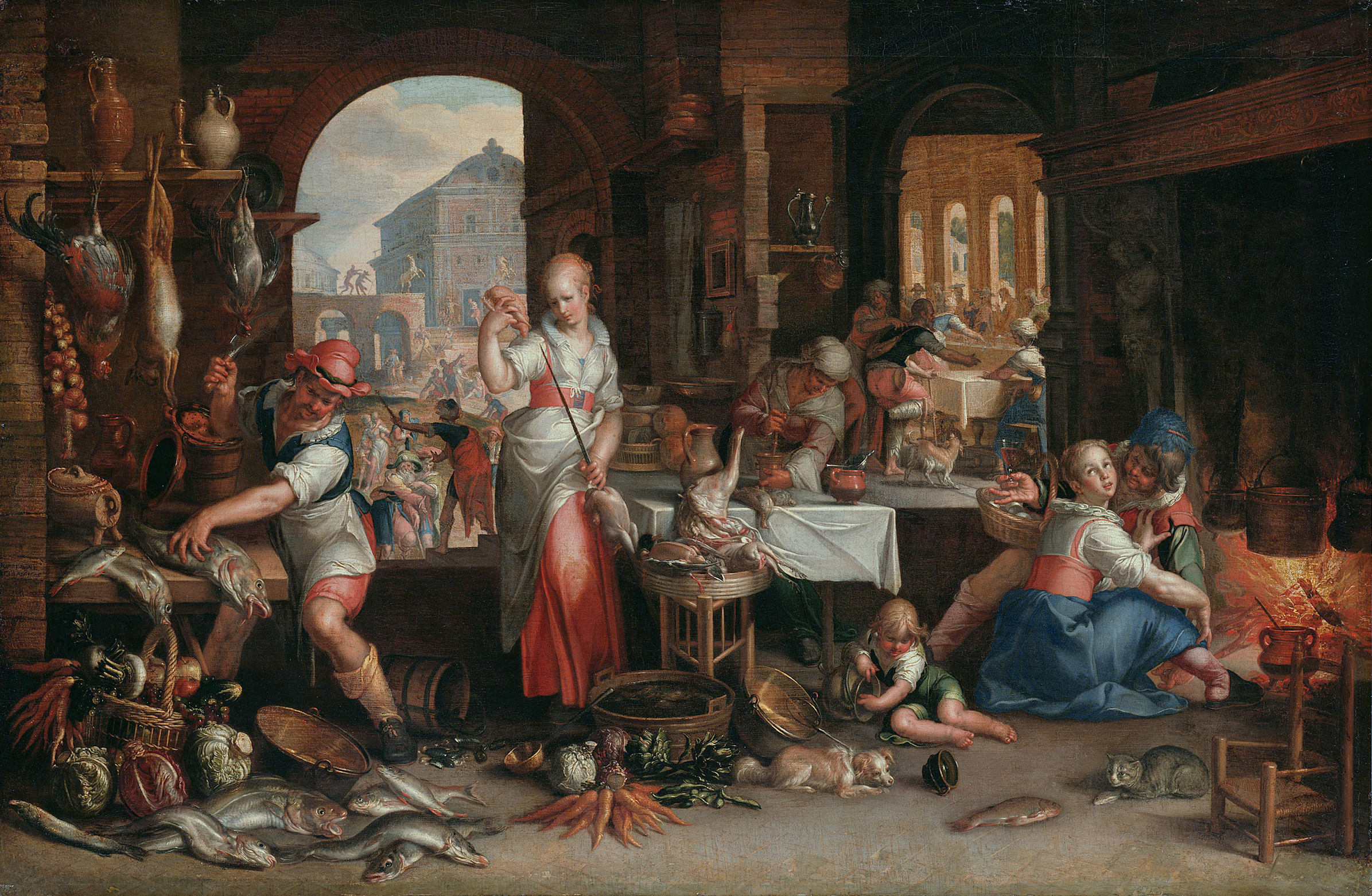
Joachim Wtewael's elaborate allegory presents itself as a Kitchen Scene with virtuoso passages of still life, 1604

Partly because most of his Netherlandish followers had only seen Spranger's work through prints and his mostly very free drawings, his more painterly handling was not adopted, and they retained the tighter and more realistic technique in which they had been trained. Many Dutch mannerist painters could switch styles depending on subject or commission, and continued to produce portraits and genre scenes in styles based on local traditions at the same time they were working on highly Mannerist paintings. After his return from Italy, Goltzius moved to a quieter proto-Baroque classicism, and his work in that style influenced many.

Joachim Wtewael, who settled in Utrecht after returning from Italy in 1590, drew more influence from Italian Mannerists than from Prague, and also continued to produce kitchen scenes and portraits alongside his naked deities. Unlike many, notably his fellow Utrechter Abraham Bloemaert, once Wtewael's repertoire of styles was formed, he never changed it until his death in 1631.

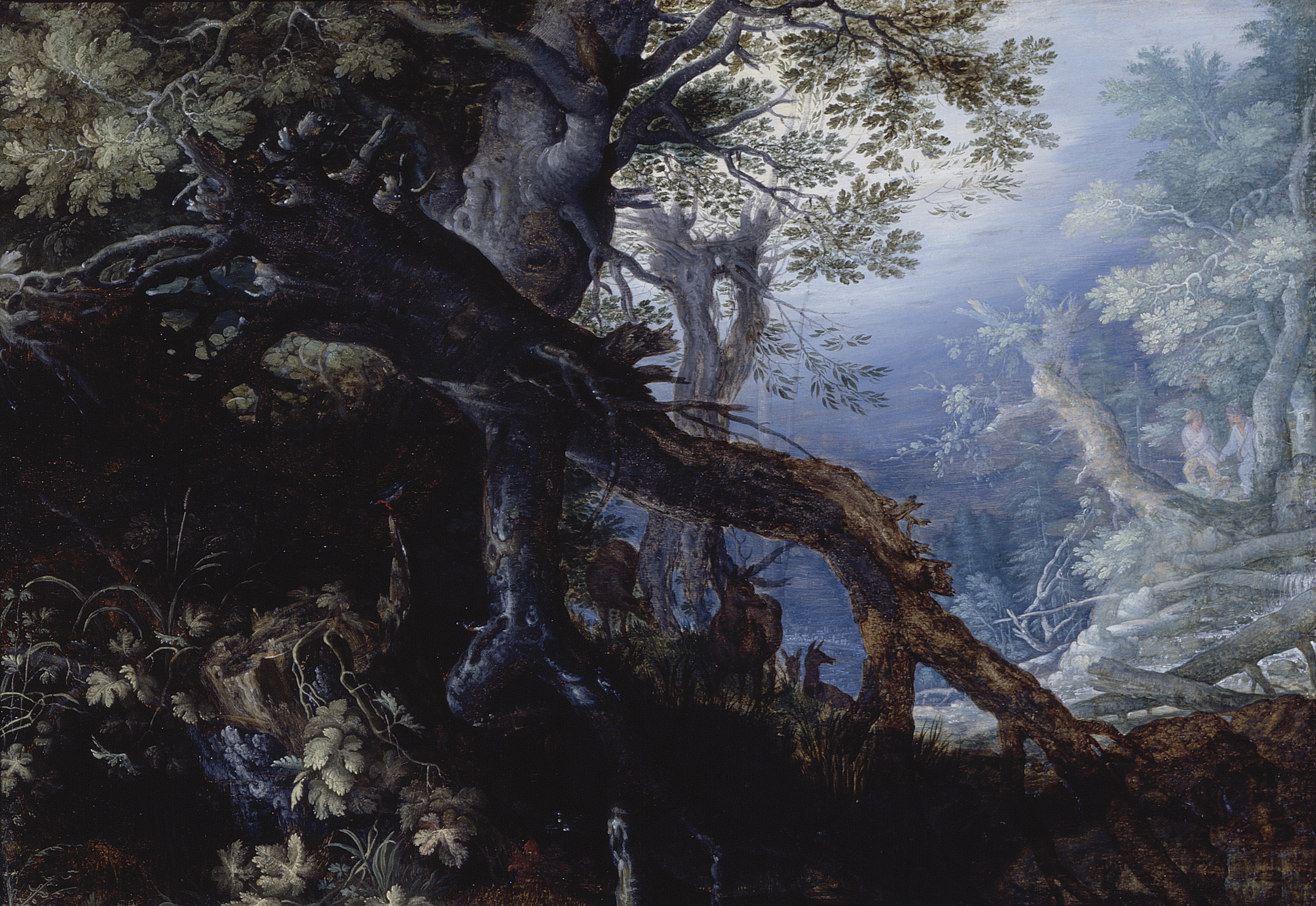
A less typical, but forward-looking, pure landscape by Roelandt Savery, Forest with deer, 1608–1610.

For painters in the Low Countries there was also the alternative of traditional Northern realist styles, which had continued to develop through Pieter Bruegel the Elder (d.1567) and other artists, and in the next century were to dominate the painting of the Dutch Golden Age. Despite his visit to Italy, Bruegel certainly cannot be called a Mannerist, but just as his paintings were keenly collected by Rudolf, Mannerist artists, including Gillis van Coninxloo and Bruegel's son Jan, followed him in developing the landscape as a subject.

Landscape painting was recognised as a Netherlandish speciality in Italy, where several Northern landscapists were based, such as Matthijs and Paul Bril, and the Germans Hans Rottenhammer and Adam Elsheimer, the last an important figure in the Early Baroque. Most still painted Netherlandish panoramas from a high view-point, with small figures forming a specific subject, but Gillis van Coninxloo followed the earlier Danube School and Albrecht Altdorfer in developing the pure and "close-up" forest landscape in his works from about 1600, which was taken up by his pupil Roelandt Savery and others. Bloemaert painted many landscapes reconciling these types by combining close-up trees, with figures, and a small distant view from above to one side (example below). Paul Bril's early landscapes were distinctly Mannerist in their artificiality and crowded decorative effects, but after his brother's death, he gradually evolved a more economical and realistic style, perhaps influenced by Annibale Carracci.

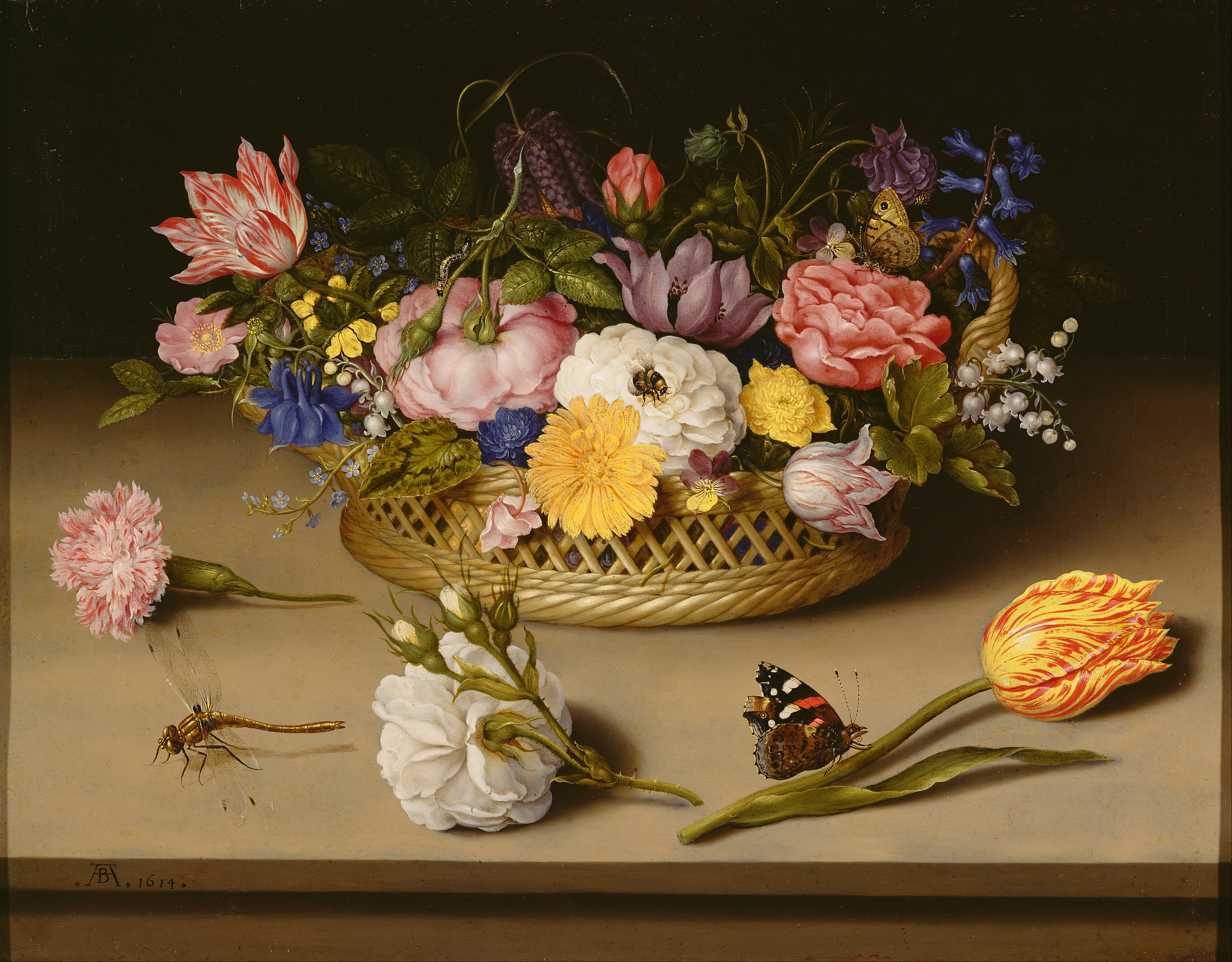
Ambrosius Bosschaert, still-life, 1614

Still-life painting, usually mostly of flowers and insects, also emerged as a genre during the period, re-purposing the inherited tradition of late Netherlandish miniature borders; Jan Brueghel the Elder also painted these. Such subjects appealed to both aristocratic patrons and the bourgeois market, which was far larger in the Netherlands. This was especially so in the Protestant north, after the movement of populations in the Revolt, where the demand for religious works was largely absent.

Joris Hoefnagel, a court painter of Rudolf II, played an important role in the development of the still life as an independent genre, and in particular still lifes of flowers. An undated flower piece executed by Hoefnagel in the form of a miniature is the first known independent still life. Hoefnagel enlivened his flower pieces with insects and attention to detail typical of his nature studies. This can be seen in his 1589 Amoris Monumentum Matri Chariss(imae) (ex-Nicolaas Teeuwisse 2008).

Karel van Mander is now remembered mainly as a writer on art rather than an artist. Though he endorsed the Italian hierarchy of genres, with history painting at the top, he was readier than Vasari and other Italian theorists (above all Michelangelo, who was brusquely dismissive of 'lower' forms of art) to accept the value of other specialized genres of art, and to accept that many artists should specialize in these, if that is where their talent lay. Specialization of many artists in the various genres was well advanced by the end of the century, in both the Netherlands and Prague, exemplified by Bruegel's two sons, Jan and Pieter, though it was also typical of the period that they both had more than one speciality during their careers. Although landscapes, scenes of peasant life, sea-scapes and still lifes could be bought by dealers for stock, and good portraits were always in demand, demand for history painting was not equal to the potential supply, and many artists, like Cornelius Ketel, were forced to specialize in portraiture; "artists travel along this road without delight", according to van Mander.

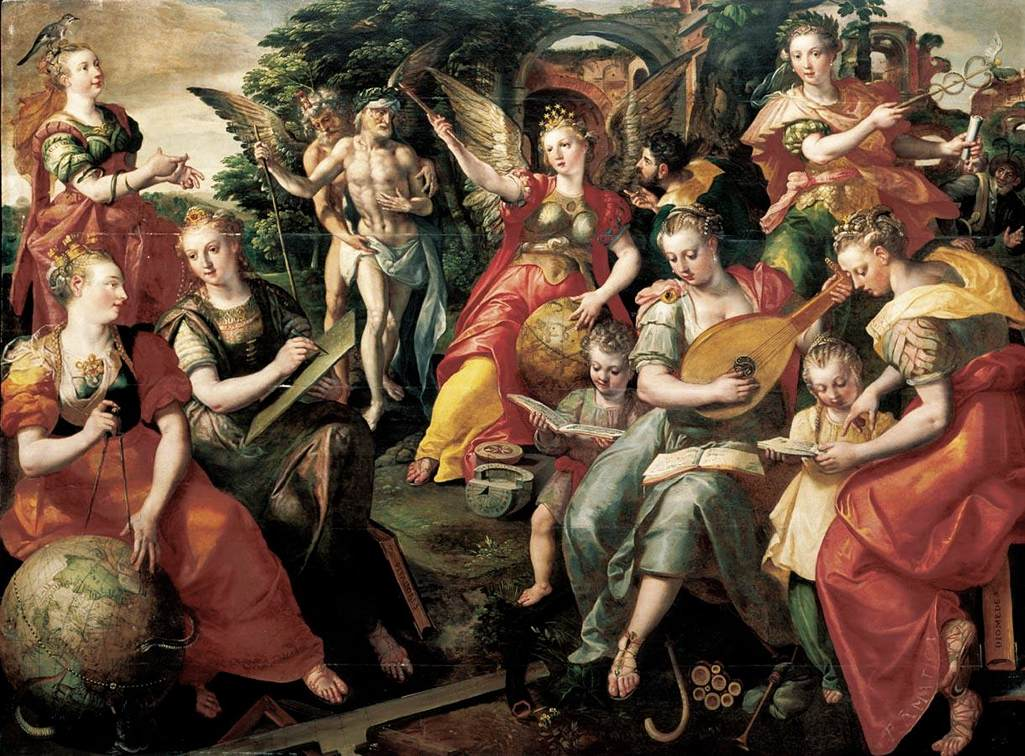
The Seven Liberal Arts by Marten de Vos, 1590

The Mannerist painters in the now permanently separated southern provinces of Habsburg Flanders in fact were less influenced by Prague than those in the United Provinces. They had more easy access to Italy, where Denis Calvaert lived from the age of twenty in Bologna, though selling much of his work back to Flanders. Both Marten de Vos and Otto van Veen had travelled there; Van Veen, who had actually worked in Rudolf's Prague, was the founder of the Guild of Romanists, an Antwerp club for artists who had visited Rome. They were more conscious of recent trends in Italian art, and the emergence of Baroque style, which in the hands of Van Veen's pupil from 1594 to 1598, Rubens, would soon sweep over Flemish art. In religious works, Flemish artists were also subject to the decrees of the Council of Trent, leading to a reaction against the more extreme virtuosities of Mannerism and to a clearer, more monumental style akin to the Italian maniera grande. In the retables of de Vos, for example, "a tempered Mannerism is combined with a preference for narrative that is more in line with Netherlandish tradition".

In Flanders, though not in the United Provinces, the mostly temporary displays for royal entries provided occasional opportunities for lavish public exhibitions of Mannerist style. Festival books recorded the entries into Antwerp of French princes and Habsburg archdukes.

== Poland–Lithuania ==
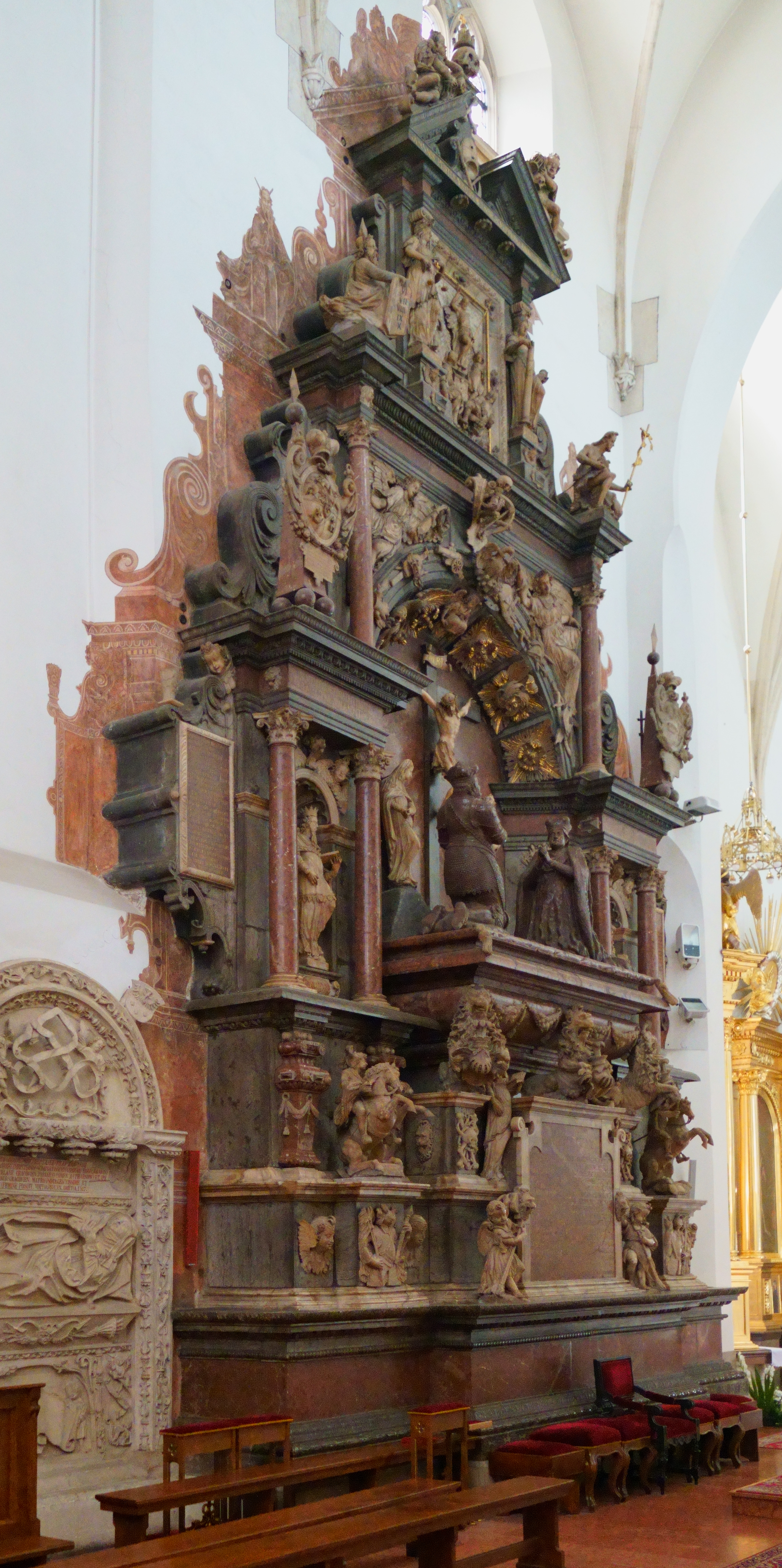
Ostrogski tomb, by Willem van den Blocke, Tarnów Cathedral, 1612

Mannerism was dominant in Poland–Lithuania between 1550 and 1650, when it was finally replaced by the Baroque. The style includes various mannerist traditions, which are closely related with ethnic and religious diversity of the country, as well as with its economic and political situation at that time. The period between 1550 and 1650 was a Golden Age of the Polish–Lithuanian Commonwealth (created in 1569) and a Golden Age of Poland. The first half of the 17th century is marked by strong activity of the Jesuits and Counter-Reformation, which led to banishing of progressive Arians (Polish Brethren) in 1658. See below for the German-Silesian painter Bartholomeus Strobel, Polish court artist from 1639.

== Dissemination in prints and books ==
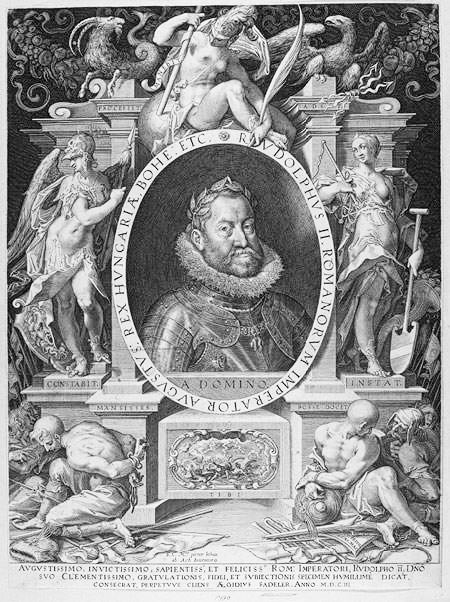
Engraving of Rudolf II by Aegidius Sadeler (1603), based on a drawing (frame) and painted portrait by Bartholomeus Spranger.

The importance of prints as a medium for disseminating Mannerist style has already been mentioned; Northern Mannerism "was a style that lent itself admirably to printmaking, and inspired the production of a succession of masterpieces of the printmaker's art". Goltzius was already the most celebrated engraver in the Netherlands when the Mannerist virus struck, and despite the disruptions of war he and other Netherlandish printmakers were connected with the well-oiled machinery of distribution across Europe that had been built up over the preceding fifty years, originally centred on Antwerp.

The same had not been true for the printmaking at Fontainebleau, and the prints made there (unusually for the period, all in etching) were technically rather rough, produced in smaller numbers, and mainly influential in France. They were made in an intense period of activity approximately from 1542 to 1548. Those made in Paris were engravings and of a higher quality; produced from about 1540 to about 1580, they had a wider distribution.

Many of the Fontainebleau prints were apparently made directly from drawn designs for the decorations of the palace, and consisted largely or entirely of ornamental frames or cartouches, although such was the scale of Fontainebleau that these might contain several full-length figures. Variations on the elaborate framings, as if made of cut, pierced and rolled parchment, played out in decorative framing schemes, engraved title pages and carved and inlaid furniture into the seventeenth century.

Printed Mannerist ornament, in a somewhat broader sense of the word, was a good deal easier to produce than the risky application of an extreme Mannerist style to large figure compositions, and had been spreading across Europe well in advance of painting in the form of frames to portrait prints, book frontispieces, so like the elaborate doorways and fireplaces of Mannerist architecture, ornament books for artists and craftsmen, and emblem books. From these and works in their own medium, goldsmiths, frame and furniture makers, and workers in many other crafts developed the vocabulary of Mannerist ornament.

The pattern illustrations shown in Wendel Dietterlin's book Architectura of 1593–94, produced in the relative backwater of Strasbourg, were some of the most extreme application of the style to architectural ornament. The Northern Mannerist style was especially influential in the prodigy houses built in England by Elizabethan courtiers.

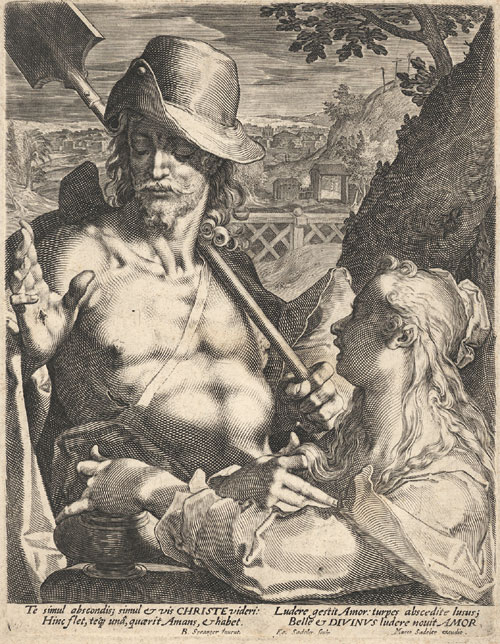
Christ and Mary Magdalene in the garden. Sadeler engraving after Bartholomeus Spranger

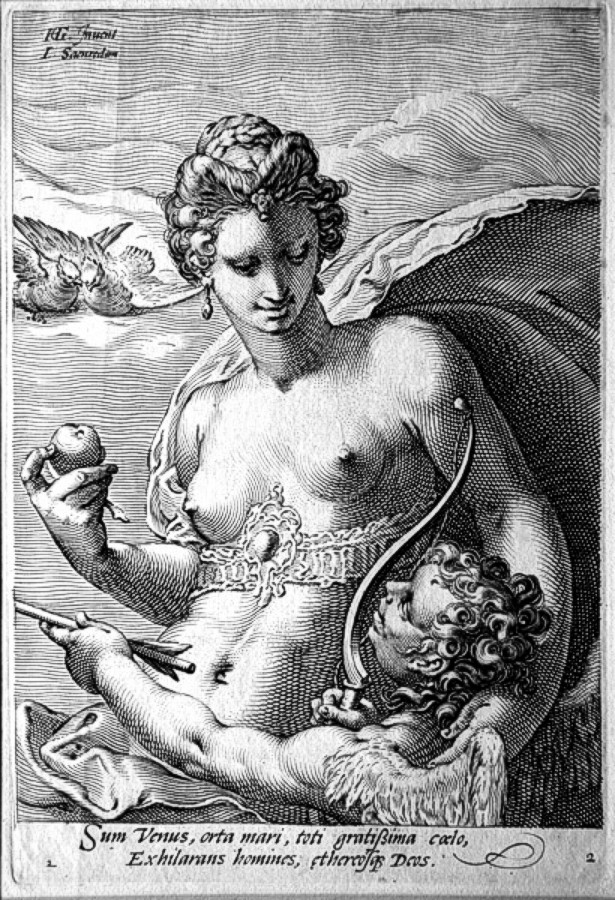
Jan Saenredam, Venus and Cupid, after Hendrick Goltzius

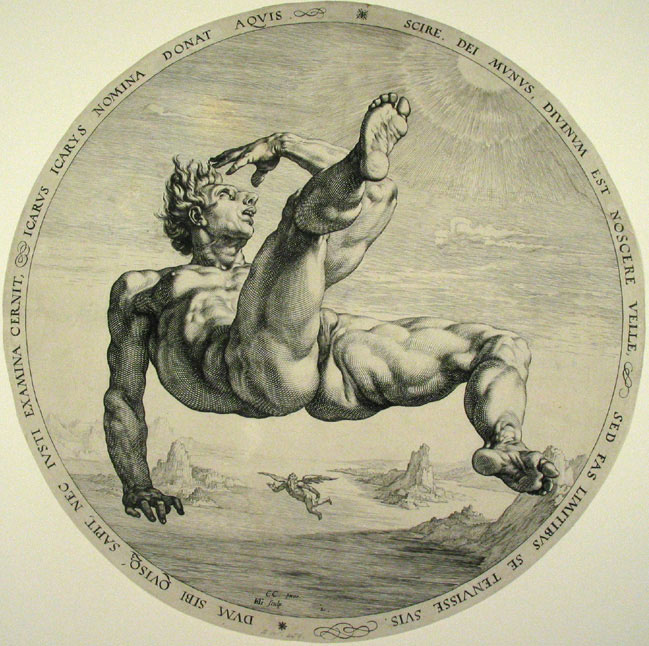
Icarus by Goltzius

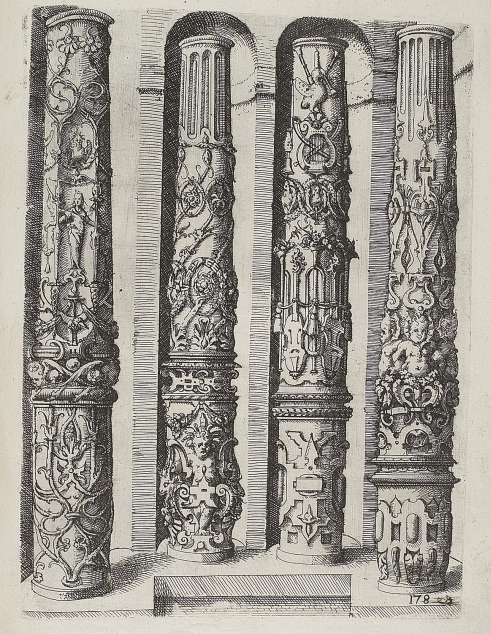
Composite order columns from Wendel Dietterlin's Architectura (1593–94).

== In the decorative arts ==
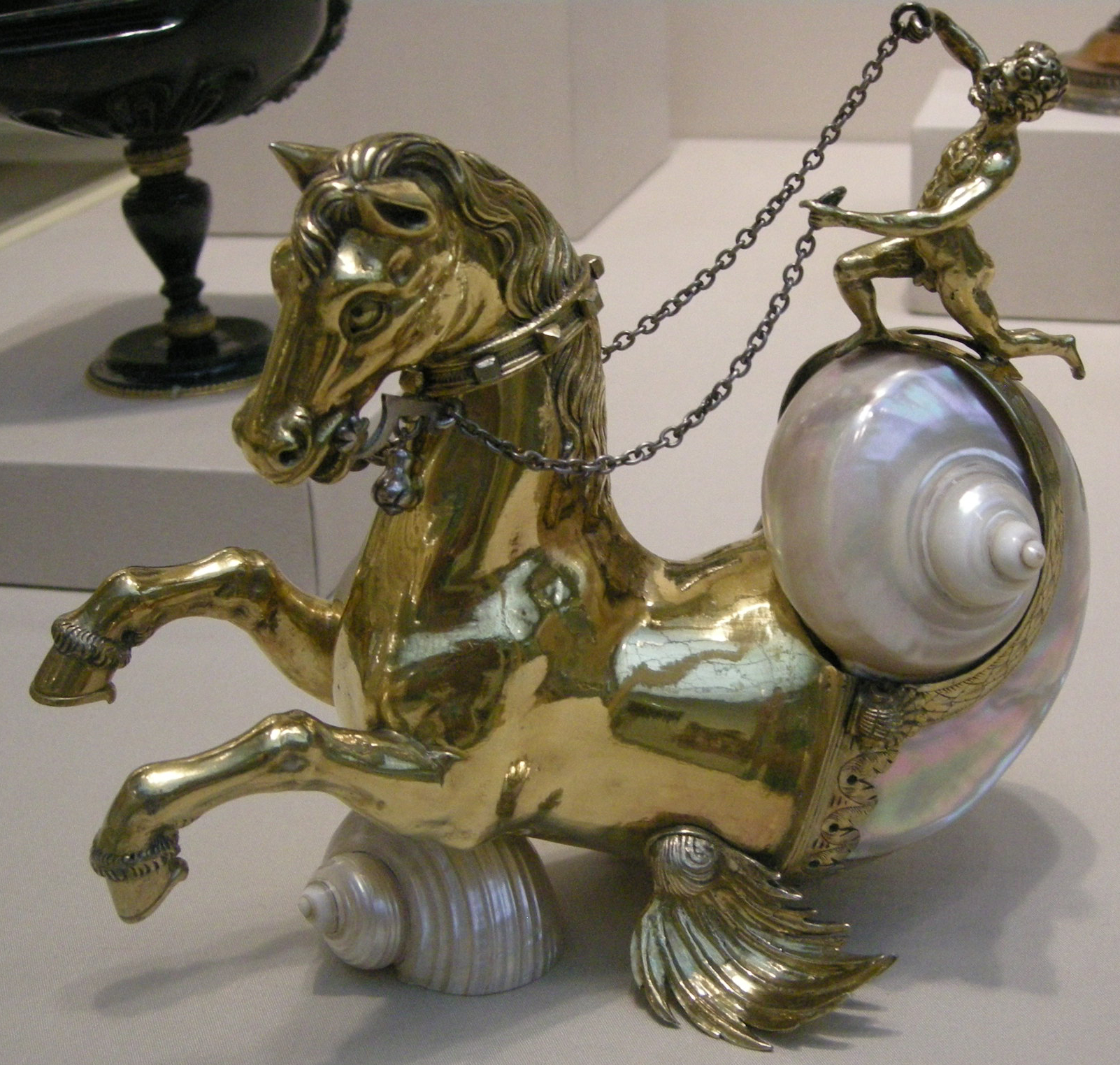
Impractical cup in form of a seahorse (presumably the head comes off), Leipzig 1590

The visual wit and sophistication of Mannerism in northern hands, which made it pre-eminently a court style, found natural vehicles in the work of goldsmiths, set off by gems and coloured enamels, in which the misshaped pearls we call "baroque" might form human and animal torsos, both as jewellery for personal adornment and in objects made for the Wunderkammer. Ewers and vases took fantastic shapes, as did standing cups with onyx or agate bowls, and elaborate saltcellars like the Saliera of Benvenuto Cellini, the apex of Mannerist goldsmithing, completed in 1543 for Francis I and later given to Rudolf's uncle, another great collector. Wenzel Jamnitzer and his son Hans, goldsmiths to a succession of Holy Roman Emperors, including Rudolf, were unexcelled in the north. Silversmiths made covered cups and richly wrought ewers and platters, strictly for display, perhaps incorporating the large sea-shells now being brought back from the tropics, which were "cherished as Art produced by Nature". In the Netherlands a uniquely anamorphic "auricular style", employing writhing and anti-architectural cartilaginous motifs was developed by the van Vianen family of silversmiths.

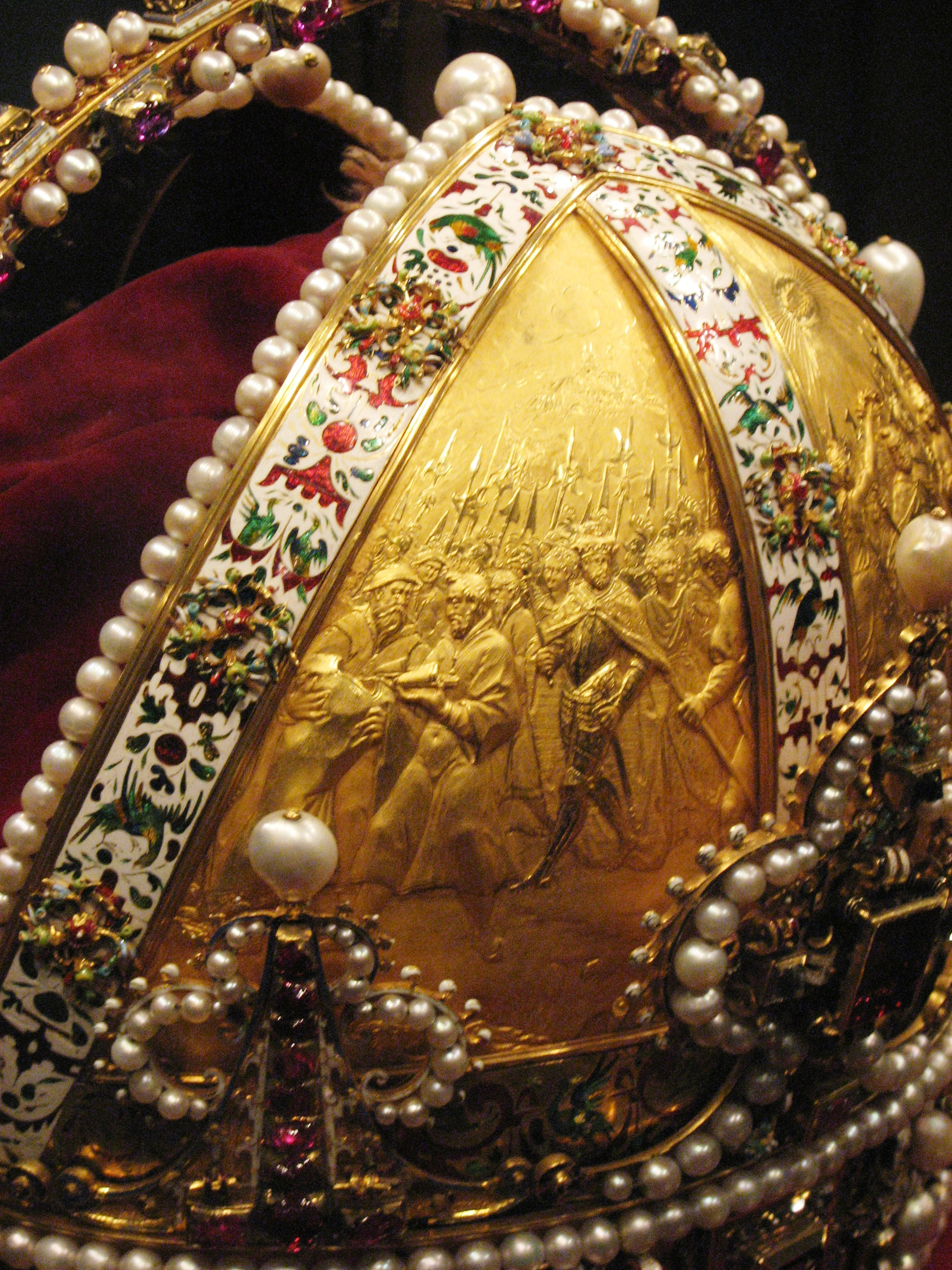
Detail of Rudolf's Imperial crown, gold, enamel and jewels. Prague, 1602

Though Mannerist sculptors produced life-size bronzes, the bulk of their output by unit was of editions of small bronzes, often reduced versions of the large compositions, which were intended to be appreciated by holding and turning in the hands, when the best "give an aesthetic stimulus of that involuntary kind that sometimes comes from listening to music". Plaquettes, small low relief panels in bronze, often gilded, were used in various settings, as on Rudolph's crown.

Female sphinxes with extravagantly elongated necks and prominent breasts support a Burgundian cabinet of walnut in the Frick Collection, New York; soon Antwerp made a specialty of richly carved and veneered cabinets inlaid with tortoiseshell, ebony, and ivory, with architectural interiors, mirrored to multiply reflections in feigned spaces. In England the Mannerist excesses of Jacobean furniture were expressed in extreme legs turned to imitate stacked covered standing cups, and a proliferation of enlaced strapwork covered plane surfaces. Following the success of Brussels tapestries woven after the Raphael Cartoons, Mannerist painters like Bernard van Orley and Perino del Vaga were called upon to design cartoons in Mannerist style for the tapestry workshops of Brussels and Fontainebleau. Painterly compositions in Mannerist taste appeared in Limoges enamels too, adapting their compositions and ornamented borders from prints. Moresques, swags and festoons of fruit inspired by rediscovered Ancient Roman grotesque ornament, first displayed in the Raphael school Vatican Stanze, were disseminated through ornament prints. This ornamental vocabulary was expressed in the North less in such frescoes and more in tapestry and illuminated manuscript borders.

In France, Saint-Porchaire ware of Mannerist forms and decor was produced in limited quantities for a restricted fashion-conscious clientele from the 1520s to the 1540s, while the crowded, disconcertingly lifelike compositions of snakes and toads characterize the Mannerist painted earthenware platters of Bernard Palissy. Like the Jamnitzers on occasion, Palissy made moulds from real small creatures and plants to apply to his creations.

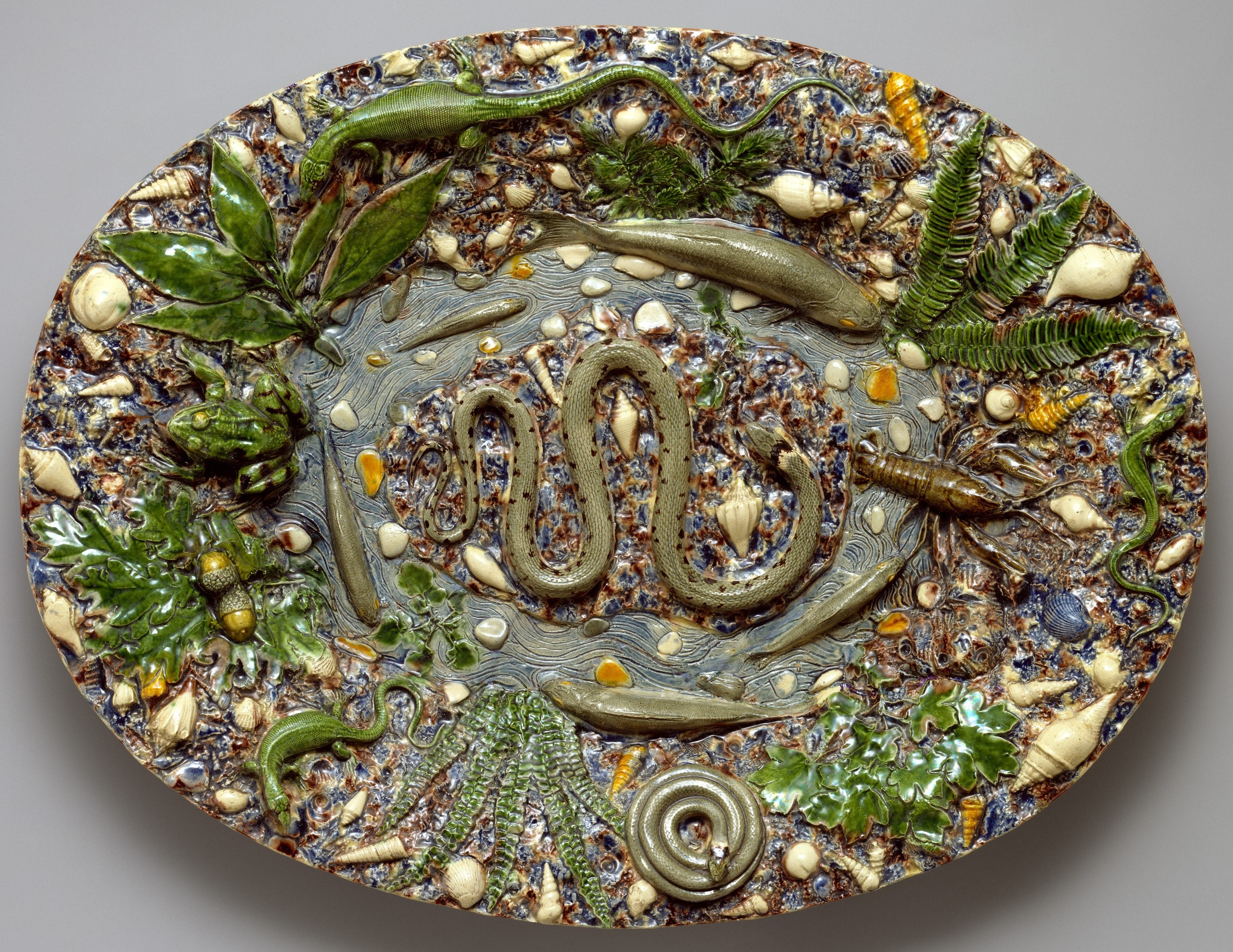
"Rustic" glazed earthenware platter attributed to Bernard Palissy, Paris

== Northern Mannerism, politics and religion ==
Northern Europe in the 16th century, and especially those areas where Mannerism was at its strongest, was affected by massive upheavals including the Protestant Reformation, Counter-Reformation, French Wars of Religion and Dutch Revolt. The relationship between Mannerism, religion and politics was very complex. Although religious works were produced, Northern Mannerist art de-emphasized religious subjects, and when it did treat them was usually against the spirit both of the Counter-Reformation attempt to control Catholic art and Protestant views on religious imagery.

In the case of Rudolf's Prague and French art after the mid-century, secular and mythological Mannerist art seems to have been partly a deliberate attempt to produce an art that appealed across religious and political divides. At the same time, Mannerism at its most extreme was usually a court style, often used to propagandize for the monarchy, and it risked becoming discredited through association with unpopular rulers. While Rudolf's genuine tolerance seems to have avoided this in Germany and Bohemia, by the end of the century Mannerism had become associated by the Calvinist Protestants and other patriots of France and the Netherlands with their unpopular Catholic rulers. But, at least earlier, many of the artists producing extreme Mannerist style were Protestant, and in France Calvinist, for example Bernard Palissy and a high proportion of the masters of Limoges enamel workshops.

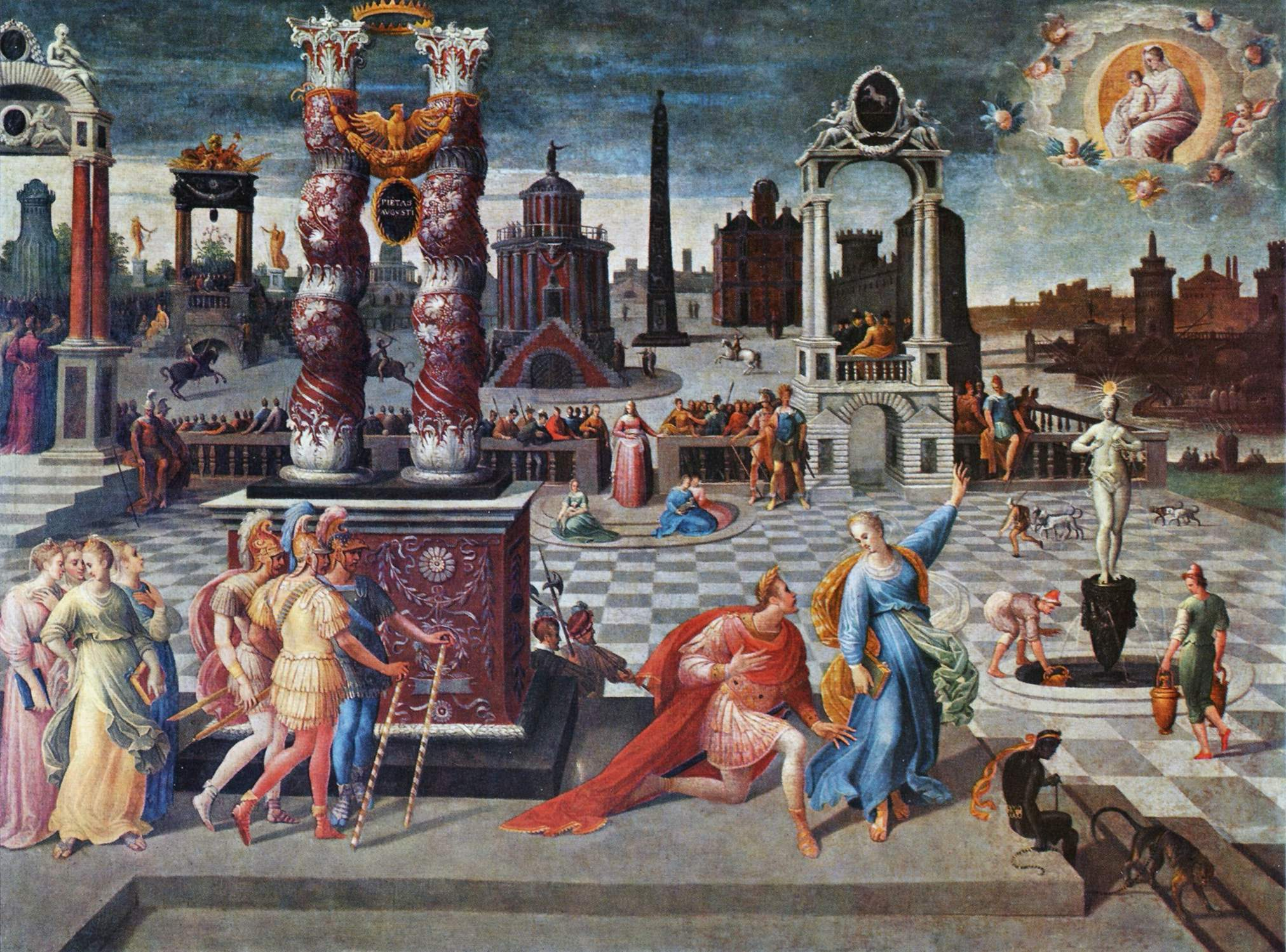
Augustus and the Tiburtine Sibyl, Antoine Caron, c. 1580

Certain Mannerist works seem to echo the violence of the time, but dressed in classical clothing. Antoine Caron painted the unusual subject of Massacres under the Triumvirate (1562, Louvre), during the Wars of Religion, when massacres were a frequent occurrence, above all in the Saint Bartholomew's Day Massacre of 1572, six years after the painting. According to art historian Anthony Blunt, Caron produced "what is perhaps the purest known type of Mannerism in its elegant form, appropriate to an exquisite but neurotic aristocratic society". His cartoons for the Valois Tapestries, which hark back to the triumphalist History of Scipio tapestries designed for Francis I by Giulio Romano, were a propaganda exercise on behalf of the Valois monarchy, emphasizing its courtly splendour at the time of its threatened destruction through civil war. Jean Cousin the Younger's only surviving painting, The Last Judgement, also comments on the civil war, betraying a "typically Mannerist penchant for miniaturization". Tiny, naked human beings "swarm over the earth like worms", while God looks down in judgement from above.

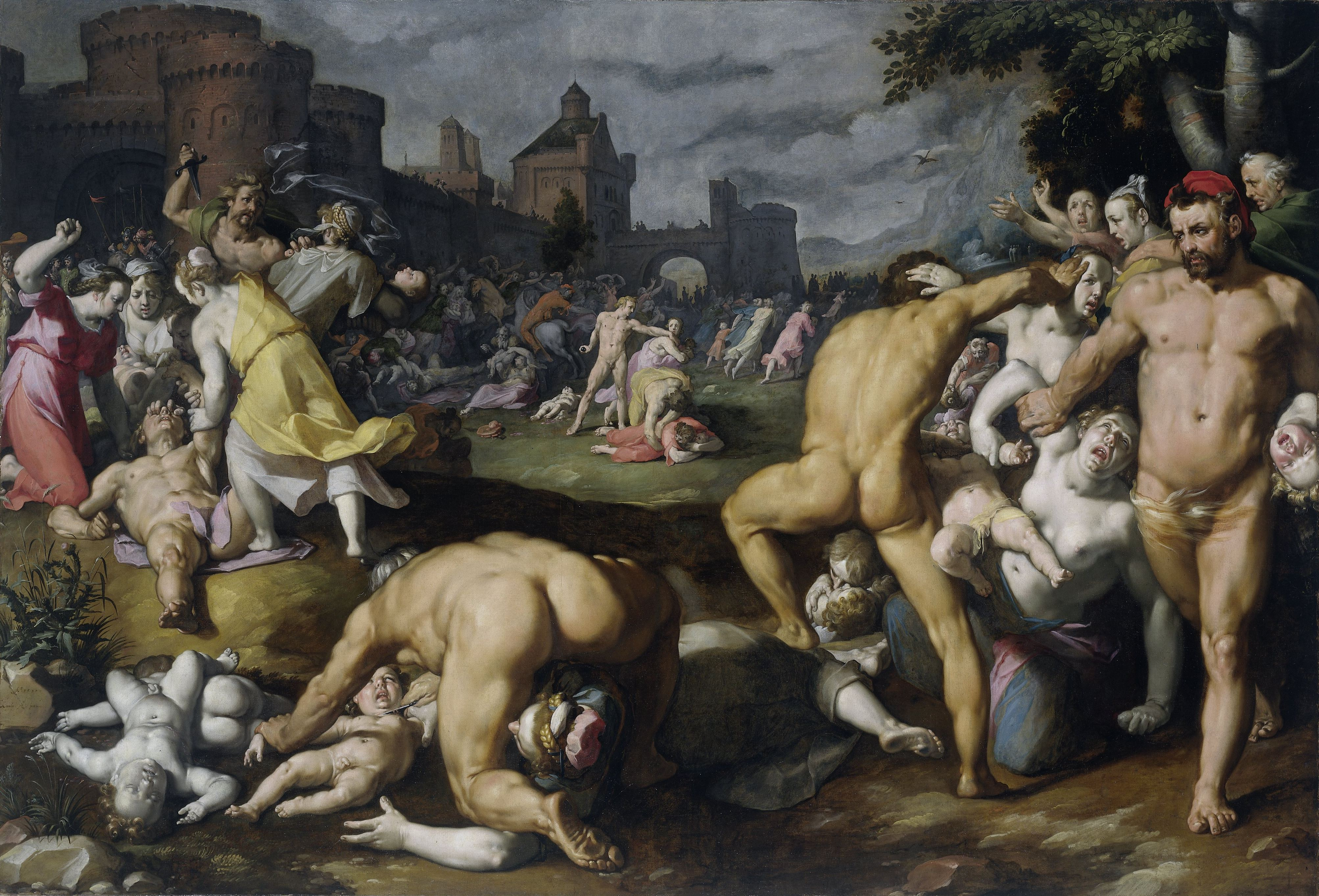
Cornelis van Haarlem, Massacre of the Innocents, 1590

Cornelis van Haarlem's Massacre of the Innocents (1590, Rijksmuseum), more Baroque than Mannerist, may involve his childhood memories of the killings (in fact only of the garrison) after the Siege of Haarlem in 1572–3, which he lived through. Bruegel's completely un-mannerist version of the same subject was bought by Rudolf, who had someone turn many of the massacred children into geese, calves, cheeses, and other less disturbing spoils. In general, Mannerist painting emphasizes peace and harmony, and less often chooses battle subjects than either the High Renaissance or the Baroque.

Another subject popularized by Bruegel, Saint John Preaching in the Wilderness, was given Mannerist treatments by several artists, as a lush landscape subject. But for Dutch Protestants the subject recalled the years before and during their Revolt, when they were forced to congregate for services in the open countryside outside towns controlled by the Spanish.

== Other outcrops ==
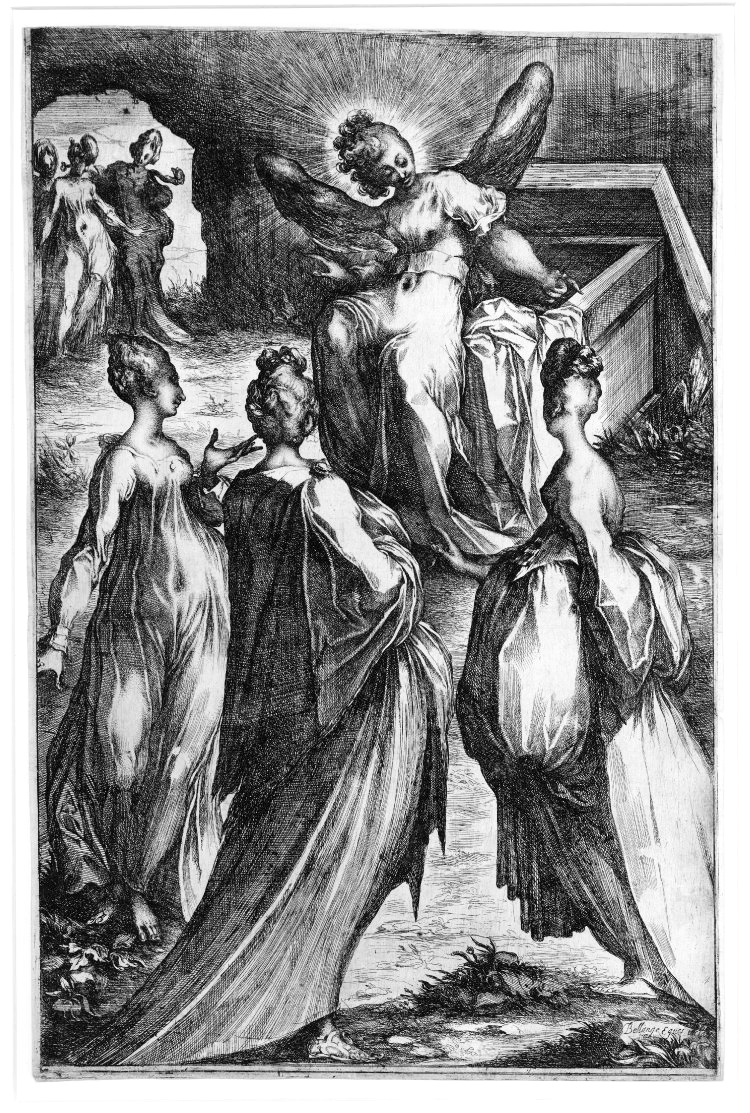
Etching by Jacques Bellange, The Three Marys at the Tomb 1610s

Henry VIII of England had been spurred in emulation of Fontainebleau to import his own, rather less stellar, team of Italian and French artists to work on his new Nonsuch Palace, which also relied heavily on stuccoes, and was decorated from about 1541. But Henry died before it was completed and a decade later it was sold by his daughter Mary without ever having seen major use by the court. The palace was destroyed before 1700 and only small fragments of work associated with it have survived, as well as a faint ripple of influence detectable in later English art, for example in the grand but unsophisticated stuccoes at Hardwick Hall.

Some (but not all) of the prodigy houses of Elizabethan architecture made use of ornament derived from the books of Wendel Dietterlin and Hans Vredeman de Vries within a distinctive overall style derived from many sources.

The portrait miniaturist Isaac Oliver shows tentative Late Mannerist influence, which also appears in some immigrant portrait painters, such as William Scrots, but generally England was one of the countries least affected by the movement except in the area of ornament.

Though Northern Mannerism achieved a landscape style, portrait-painting remained without Northern equivalents of Bronzino or Parmigianino, unless the remarkable but somewhat naive Portraiture of Elizabeth I is considered as such.

One of the last flowerings of Northern Mannerism came in Lorraine, whose court painter Jacques Bellange (c.1575–1616) is now known only from his extraordinary etchings, though he was also a painter. His style derives from Netherlandish Mannerism, though his technique from Italian etchers, especially Barocci and Ventura Salimbeni. Unusually, his subjects were mainly religious, and though the costumes are often extravagant, suggest intense religious feelings on his part.

Even later, the German-Silesian painter Bartholomeus Strobel, who had spent the last years of Rudolf's reign as a young artist in Prague, continued the Rudolfine style into the 1640s, despite the horrors visited on Silesia by the Thirty Years War, in works such as his enormous Feast of Herod with the Beheading of St John the Baptist in the Prado. From 1634 he retreated to the safety of Poland as court artist.

== Artists ==
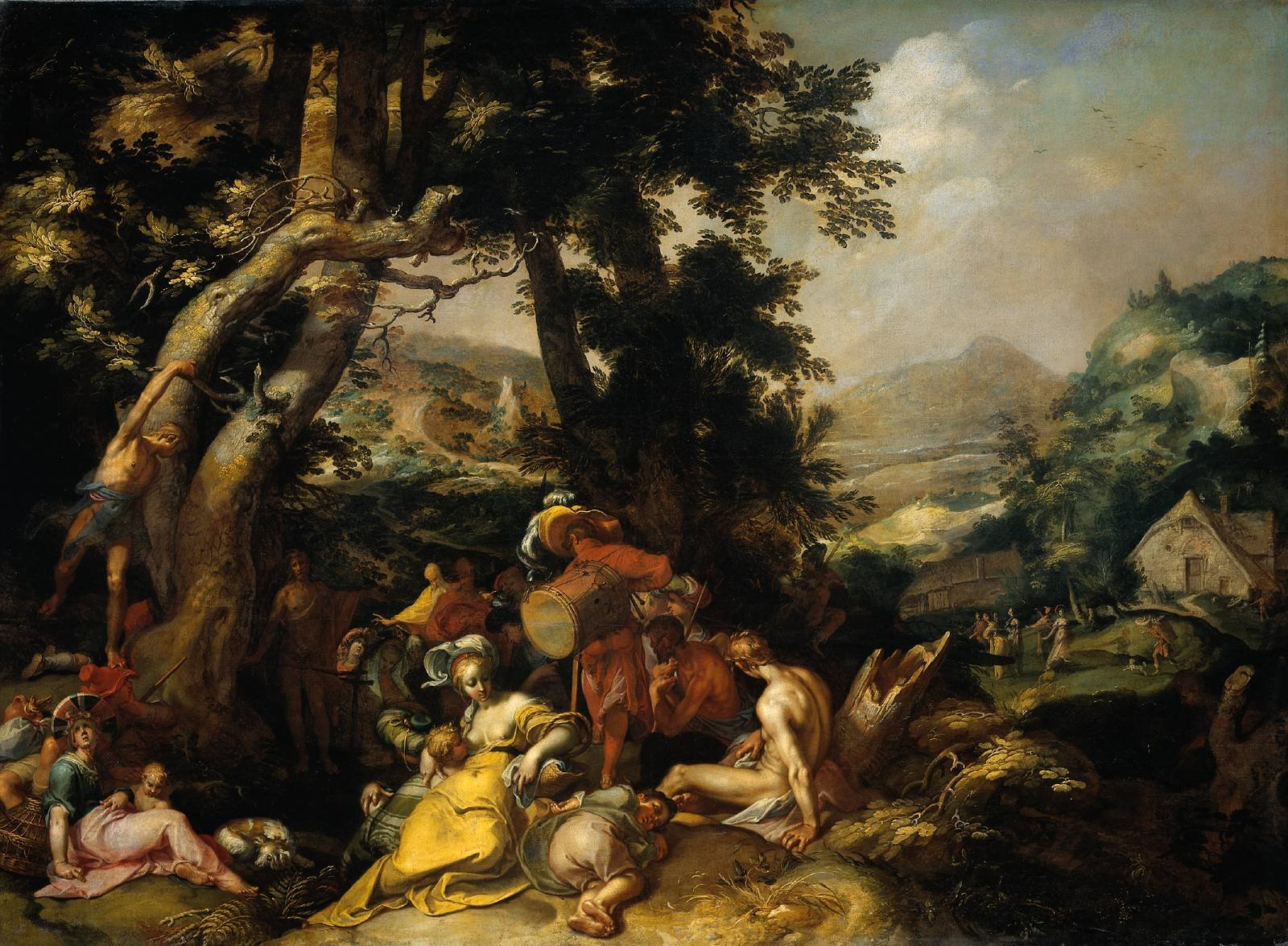
Abraham Bloemaert, Landscape with St John Preaching in the Wilderness, c. 1600

French artists influenced by the first School of Fontainebleau:

Jean Cousin the Elder (1500–c. 1590)
Jean Goujon (c. 1510–after 1572) sculptor and architect
Juste de Juste (c. 1505 – c. 1559) – sculptor and etcher
Antoine Caron (1521–1599)

The continuing French tradition:

Germain Pilon (c. 1537–1590), sculptor
Androuet du Cerceau, family of architects; Jacques I introducing Mannerist ornament
Jean Cousin the Younger (ca. 1522–1595), painter
Toussaint Dubreuil (c. 1561–1602), second School of Fontainebleau:

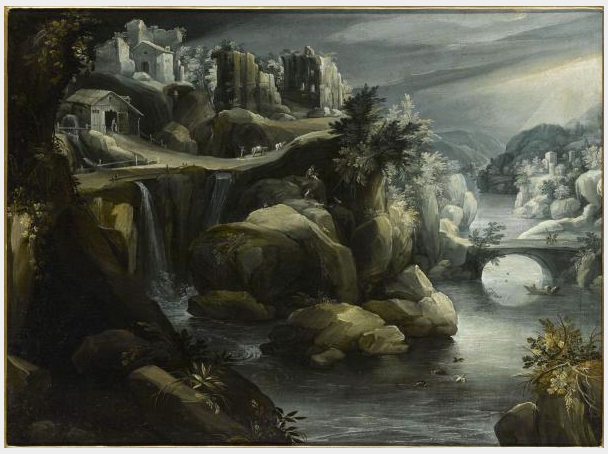
Landscape (oil on canvas, 63.5 x 87 cm, Musée Fesch), attributed to Matthijs Bril

Working for Rudolf:

Giambologna (1529–1608), Flemish sculptor based in Florence
Adriaen de Vries (1556–1626), Dutch sculptor, pupil of Giambologna, who went to Prague
Bartholomeus Spranger (1546–1611) – Flemish painter, Rudolf's main painter
Hans von Aachen (1552–1615) – German, mythological subjects and portraits for Rudolf
Joseph Heintz the Elder (1564–1609) – Swiss pupil of Hans von Aachen
Paul van Vianen, Dutch silversmith and artist
Aegidius Sadeler – mainly a printmaker
Wenzel Jamnitzer (1507/8–1585), and his son Hans II and grandson Christof, German goldsmiths
Joris Hoefnagel, especially for miniatures of natural history
Roelandt Savery, landscapes with animals and still-lifes

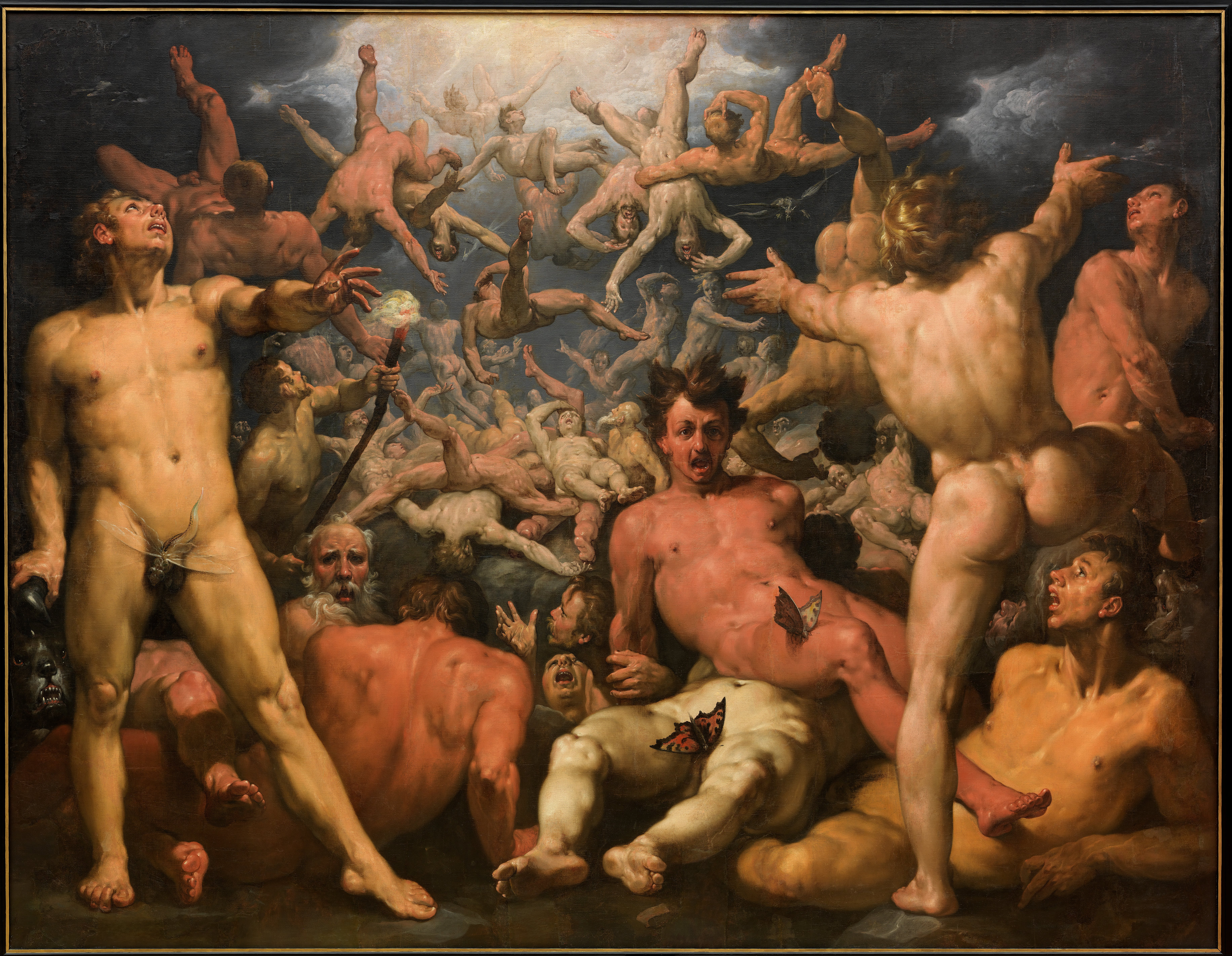
The Fall of the Titans (1588–1590) by Cornelis van Haarlem

In the Netherlands:

Herri met de Bles, (1510–1555/60), landscape artist, earlier than the others
Karel van Mander – now best known as a biographer of Netherlandish artists
Hendrick Goltzius (1558–1617) – the leading engraver of the period, and later a painter in a less Mannerist style.
Cornelis van Haarlem (1562–1638)
Hubert Gerhard Dutch, (c. 1540/1550-1620)
Joachim Wtewael (1566–1638)
Jan Saenredam – mainly a printmaker
Jacob de Gheyn II – mainly a printmaker
Abraham Bloemaert (1566–1651), in the early part of his career
Hans Vredeman de Vries (1527–c. 1607), architect, ornament designer, who wrote on garden design.

Flemish:

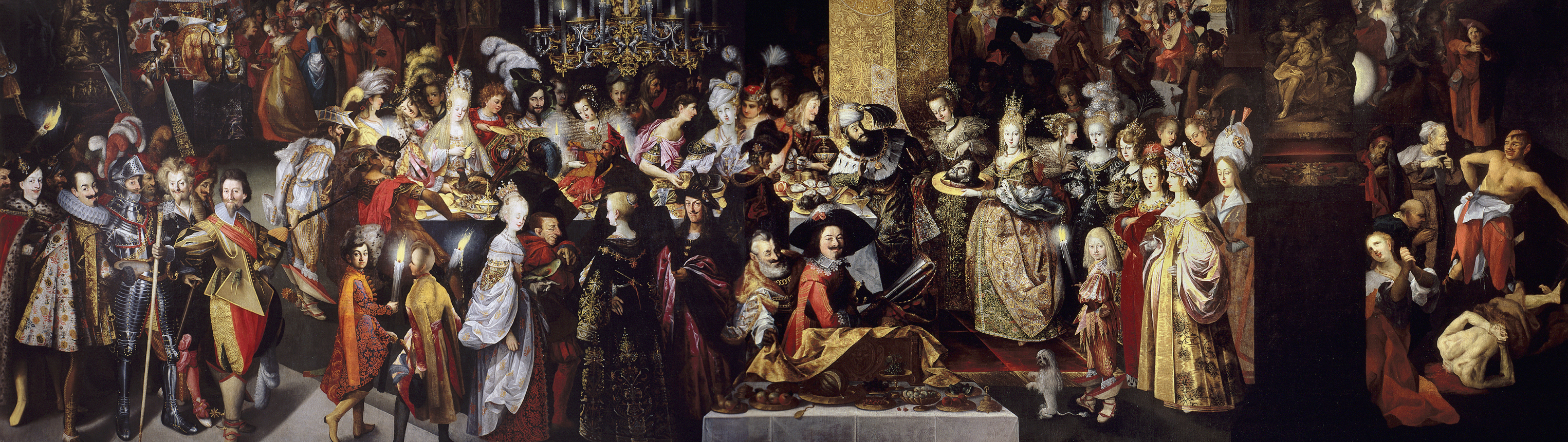
Feast of Herod with the Beheading of St John the Baptist, c. 1630s, Prado; almost 10 metres wide, Bartholomeus Strobel's masterpiece, and an allegory of the Thirty Years War

Denis Calvaert – worked mostly in Italy, in a largely Italian style, as did
Paul and Matthijs Bril, mostly painting landscapes
Marten de Vos, founder of the Guild of Romanists
Otto van Veen (1556–1629), painter and draughtsman active in Antwerp and Brussels

German:

Hans von Aachen (1552–1615) – German, mythological subjects and portraits for Rudolf II
Wenzel Jamnitzer (1507/8–1585), and his son Hans II and grandson Christof, German goldsmiths
Hans Rottenhammer (1564–1625) landscapist from Munich, spent several years in Italy
Wendel Dietterlin (c. 1550–1599), German painter, best known for his book on architectural decoration
Bartholomeus Strobel (1591–c. 1550), court portraitist, also religious scenes, in Silesia and then Poland.

Elsewhere:

Jacques Bellange (c. 1575–1616), court painter of Lorraine, whose work only survives in etching.

== See also ==
- Northern Renaissance
- Renaissance humanism in Northern Europe
- Renaissance in the Low Countries
- Renaissance in Poland
