= Jean Cousin the Younger =

French artist (c.1522–1595)

Jean Cousin the Younger's Livre de Portraiture (Paris, 1608)

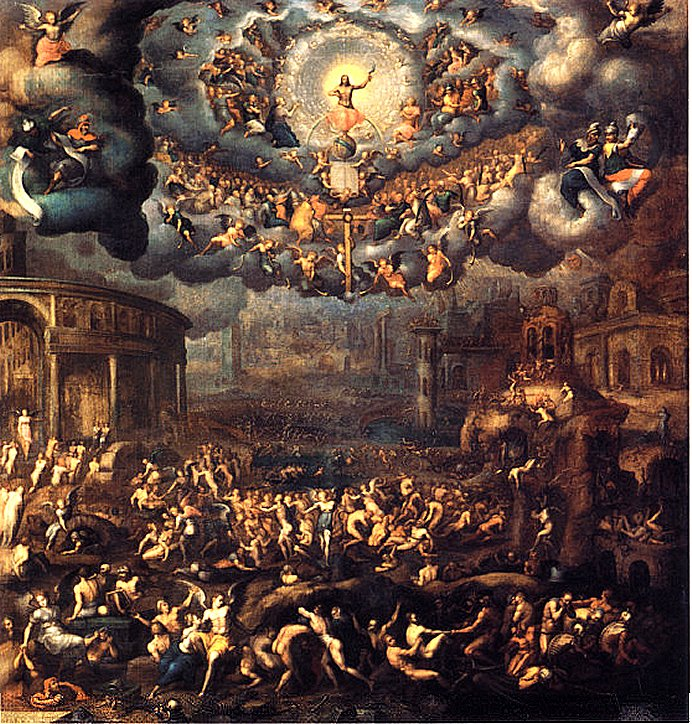
Jean Cousin the Younger's The Last Judgement, Louvre

Jean Cousin the Younger ("le jeune", sometimes given as Jehan in the old style instead of Jean) (ca. 1522–1595) was born in Sens, France around 1522, the son of the famous painter and sculptor Jean Cousin the Elder ca. 1490–ca. 1560) who was often compared to his noted contemporary, Albrecht Dürer. Having trained to become an artist under his father, Jean the Younger showed as much talent as his father, and their work is nearly indistinguishable even to the expert. Just before his death, Jean the Elder published his noted work Livre de Perspective in 1560 in which he noted that his son would soon be publishing a companion entitled, Livre de Pourtraicture.

While there have been some reports that an edition of Livre de Pourtraicture was first printed in 1571 and again in 1589, no copies appear to exist. Instead, the most likely first printing of the work was 1595 in Paris by David Leclerc, with woodcuts engraved by Jean Leclerc, just after Jean the Younger's death. The book is one of the most famous on the subject of artistic anatomy and was printed again and again into the late 17th century.

== Sources ==
- Adapted from public domain text at Jehan Cousin le jeune Biography. Historical Anatomies on the Web. US National Library of Medicine.
