= Beheading of John the Baptist =

Biblical event and Christian holy day

Beheading of Saint John the Baptist
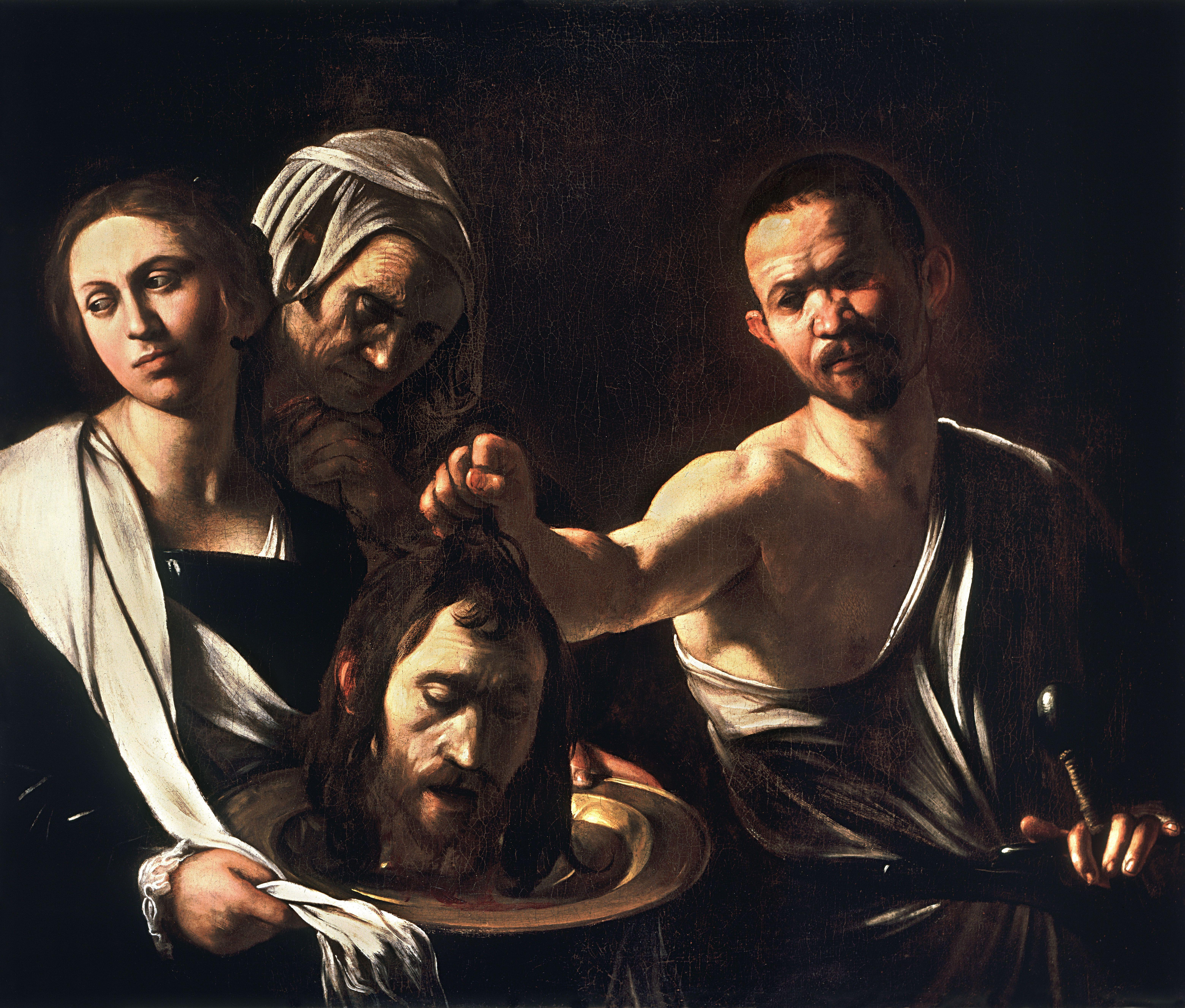
- Salome with the Head of John the Baptist by Caravaggio, National Gallery, London, c. 1607–1610

Decollation of Saint John the Baptist; Beheading of the Forerunner
- Venerated in: Catholic Church; Eastern Orthodox Church; Oriental Orthodox Church; Anglican Communion
- Feast: 29 August (Catholic), 11 September (Eastern Orthodox) (Translation of Relic)
- Attributes: The severed head of Saint John the Baptist on a round silver platter, often held by Salome or Herod Antipas

The beheading of John the Baptist, also known as the decollation of Saint John the Baptist or the beheading of the Forerunner, is a biblical event commemorated as a holy day by various Christian churches. According to the New Testament, Herod Antipas, ruler of Galilee under the Roman Empire, had imprisoned John the Baptist because he had publicly reproved Herod for divorcing his first wife and unlawfully taking his sister-in-law (his brother's wife) Herodias as his second wife. He then ordered him to be killed by beheading, which occurred at the hilltop fortress of Machaerus overlooking the Dead Sea in modern-day Jordan.

As a non-Biblical source, Jewish historian Josephus also recounts that Herod had John imprisoned and killed due to "the great influence John had over the people", which might persuade John "to raise a rebellion". Josephus also writes that many of the Jews believed that Herod's later military disaster was God's punishment for his treatment of John.

== Traditional accounts ==
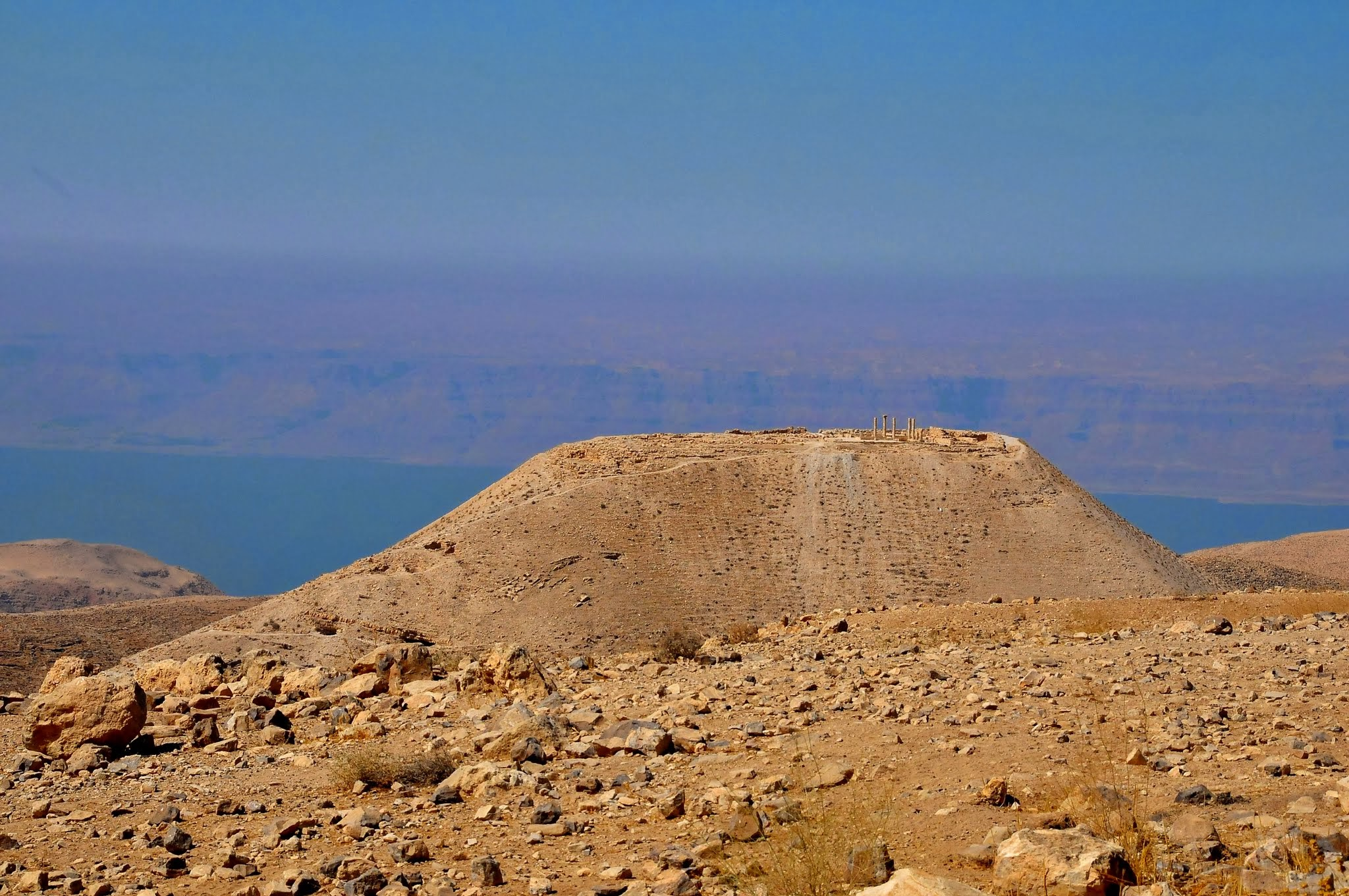
The ruins of Machaerus, a hilltop fortress overlooking the Dead Sea in modern-day Jordan, where John's decapitation reportedly took place around 32 AD.

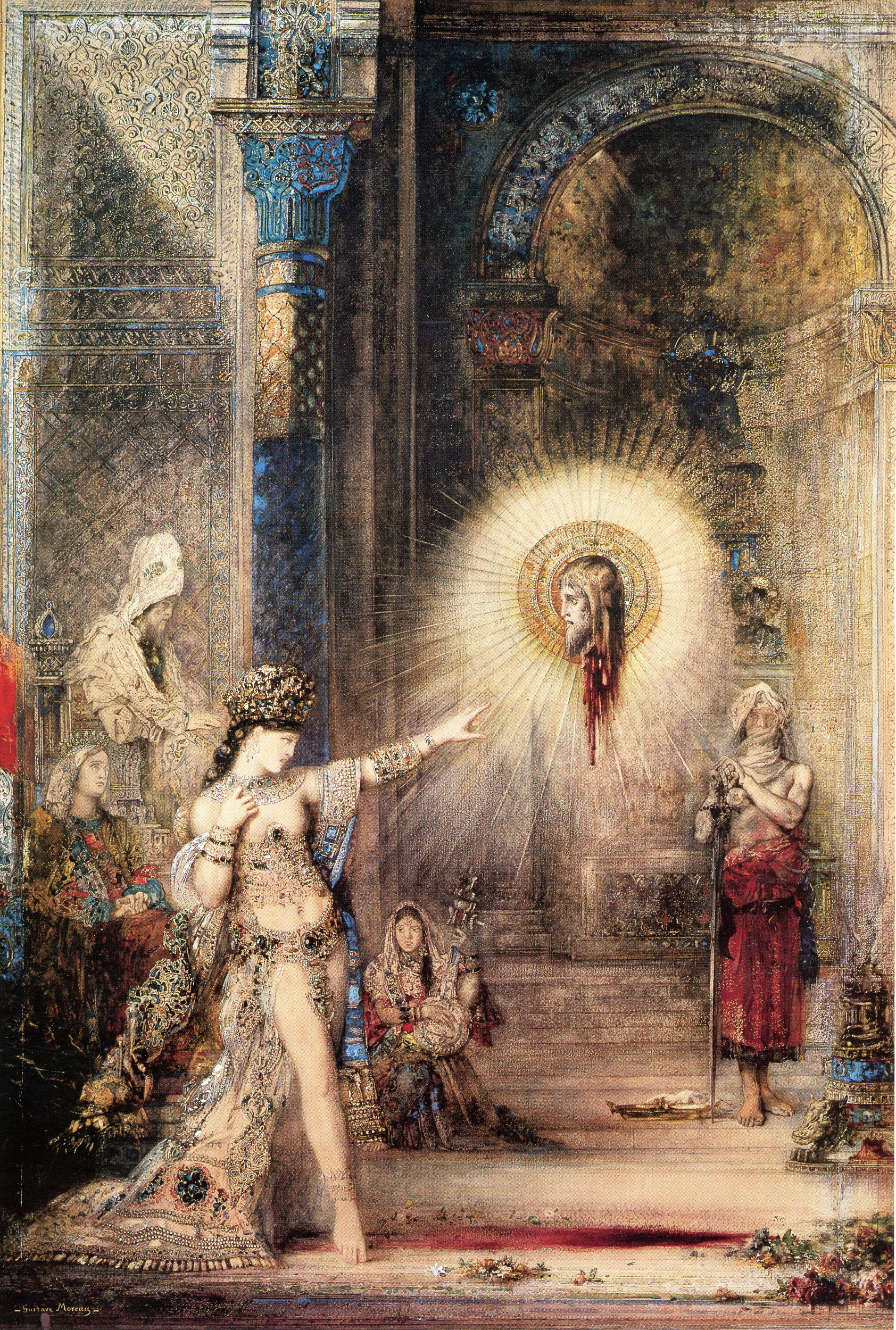
Salome and the Apparition of the Baptist's Head by Gustave Moreau. Watercolour painting, 1876. Now in Musée d'Orsay, Paris, France.

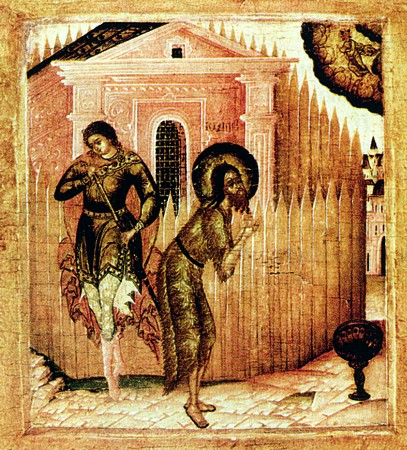
Icon of the Beheading of John the Baptist (Museum of Icons, Recklinghausen)

According to the synoptic Gospels, Herod Antipas, who was tetrarch of Galilee and Perea under the Roman Empire, had imprisoned John the Baptist because he had admonished Antipas for divorcing his wife (Phasaeli, daughter of King Aretas of Nabataea) and unlawfully taking Herodias, the wife of his brother Herod II. On Antipas's birthday, Herodias' daughter (whom Josephus identifies as Salome) danced before the king and his guests. Her dancing pleased Antipas so much that in his drunkenness he promised to give her anything she desired, up to half of his kingdom. When Salome asked her mother what she should request, she was told to ask for the head of John the Baptist on a platter. Although Herod Antipas was appalled by the request, he reluctantly agreed and had John executed by beheading in the prison. In art, the episode is known as The Feast of Herod.

Josephus also relates in his Antiquities of the Jews that Herod Antipas killed John, stating that he did so, "lest the great influence John had over the people might put it into his [John's] power and inclination to raise a rebellion, (for they seemed ready to do any thing he should advise), [so Herod] thought it best [to put] him to death." He further states that many of the Jews believed that the military disaster that fell upon Herod Antipas at the hands of Aretas, his father-in-law (Phasaelis' father), was God's punishment for his unrighteous behaviour.

None of the sources gives an exact date, which was probably in the years 28–29 AD (Matthew 14:1–12; Mark 6:14–27; Luke 9:9) after imprisoning John the Baptist in 27 AD (Matthew 4:12; Mark 1:14) at the behest of Herodias, his brother's wife, whom he took as his mistress (Matthew 14:3–5; Mark 6:17–20). According to Josephus, the death took place at the fortress of Machaerus.

The following comparison table is primarily based on the New International Version (NIV) English translation of the New Testament. The account of Flavius Josephus in Antiquities of the Jews was translated by William Whiston.

	Matthew	Mark	Luke–Acts	John	Josephus
Prologue			Luke 1:5–80: Birth of John the Baptist	John 1:6–18: Prologue about John the Baptist's identity and mission	
Ministry	Matthew 3:1–17: John the Baptist preached to people and baptised them in the Jordan.; John the Baptist baptised Jesus.	Mark 1:4–11: John the Baptist preached to people and baptised them in the Jordan.; John the Baptist baptised Jesus.	Luke 3:1–22; Acts 1:5, 1:21–22, 10:37–38, 11:16, 13:24–25, 18:25, 19:3–4: John the Baptist preached to people and baptised them in the Jordan.; John the Baptist baptised Jesus.	John 1:19–42, 3:22–36, 4:1: John the Baptist preached to people and baptised them in the Jordan. He denied being the Messiah.; It is unstated whether or not John the Baptist baptised Jesus. He insisted Jesus was superior: the Son/Lamb of God.; Two of John the Baptist's disciples – including Andrew – defected to Jesus at John's own insistence.; John the Baptist baptised at Enon/Salim before being arrested. His disciples told him Jesus was successful; John endorsed Jesus as his superior and the Son of God.; Jesus heard the rumour he was more successful than John.	Jewish Antiquities 18. 5. 2.: John the Baptist preached to people and baptised them.
Prison	Matthew 11:2–7, 14:6–12: John the Baptist criticised king Herod Antipas for marrying his brother's ex-wife Herodias.; John the Baptist was therefore arrested by Herod Antipas.; John the Baptist, in prison, heard about Jesus' deeds, sent some disciples to ask if Jesus was the awaited one. Jesus listed his miracles and said: 'Blessed is he who does not reject me'. The disciples returned to John the Baptist.; Herod wanted to kill John, but was afraid of the people.; John the Baptist was executed by beheading by Herod Antipas on the request of Herodias' daughter. His disciples buried his remains and told Jesus.	Mark 1:14, 6:17–29: John the Baptist criticised king Herod Antipas for marrying his brother's ex-wife Herodias.; John the Baptist was therefore arrested by Herod Antipas.; Herodias wanted John killed, but Herod Antipas protected John because he knew John was a just and holy man.; John the Baptist was executed by beheading by Herod Antipas on the request of Herodias' daughter. His disciples buried his remains.	Luke 3:19–20, 7:18–25, 9:9: John the Baptist criticised king Herod Antipas for marrying his brother's ex-wife Herodias and other evils.; John the Baptist was therefore arrested by Herod Antipas.; John the Baptist [in prison?] heard about Jesus' deeds (in Capernaum and Nain), sent 2 disciples to ask if Jesus was the awaited one. Jesus listed his miracles and said: 'Blessed is he who does not reject me.' The disciples returned to John the Baptist.; [no execution motive mentioned]; John the Baptist was executed by beheading by Herod Antipas.	John 3:24: [no arrest motive mentioned]; John the Baptist was arrested.; [no execution motive mentioned]; [no execution mentioned]	Jewish Antiquities 18. 5. 2.: John the Baptist gained a large following.; Herod Antipas feared the widely popular John the Baptist would incite his followers to launch a rebellion against his rule.; Therefore, he had John the Baptist arrested and imprisoned at Macherus.; Herod Antipas later had John the Baptist executed 'to prevent any mischief he might cause, and not bring himself into difficulties'.
Epilogue	Matthew 14:1–6: Word of Jesus' miracles spread.; Herod Antipas concluded Jesus was actually John the Baptist risen from the dead.	Mark 6:14–16: Word of Jesus' miracles spread; some people believed Jesus was actually John the Baptist risen from the dead, others believed he was Elijah, still others he was like a prophet of the past.; Herod Antipas agreed with those saying Jesus was actually John the Baptist risen from the dead.	Luke 9:7–9: Word of Jesus' miracles spread; some people believed Jesus was actually John the Baptist risen from the dead, others believed he was Elijah, still others that an old prophet had risen.; Herod Antipas did not believe Jesus was John the Baptist, but had to be someone else.	John 5:30–38: Jesus said his claims were reliable, because he knew John the Baptist's testimony about Jesus was reliable, even though Jesus did not need human testimony.; John 10:40–42: The narrator downplays John the Baptist's deeds in comparison to Jesus, and claims John's testimony of Jesus had convinced many people to believe in Jesus.	Jewish Antiquities 18. 5. 2.: Some Jews believed God later destroyed Herod Antipas' army as a punishment, because he had unjustly executed John the Baptist.

== Feast day ==
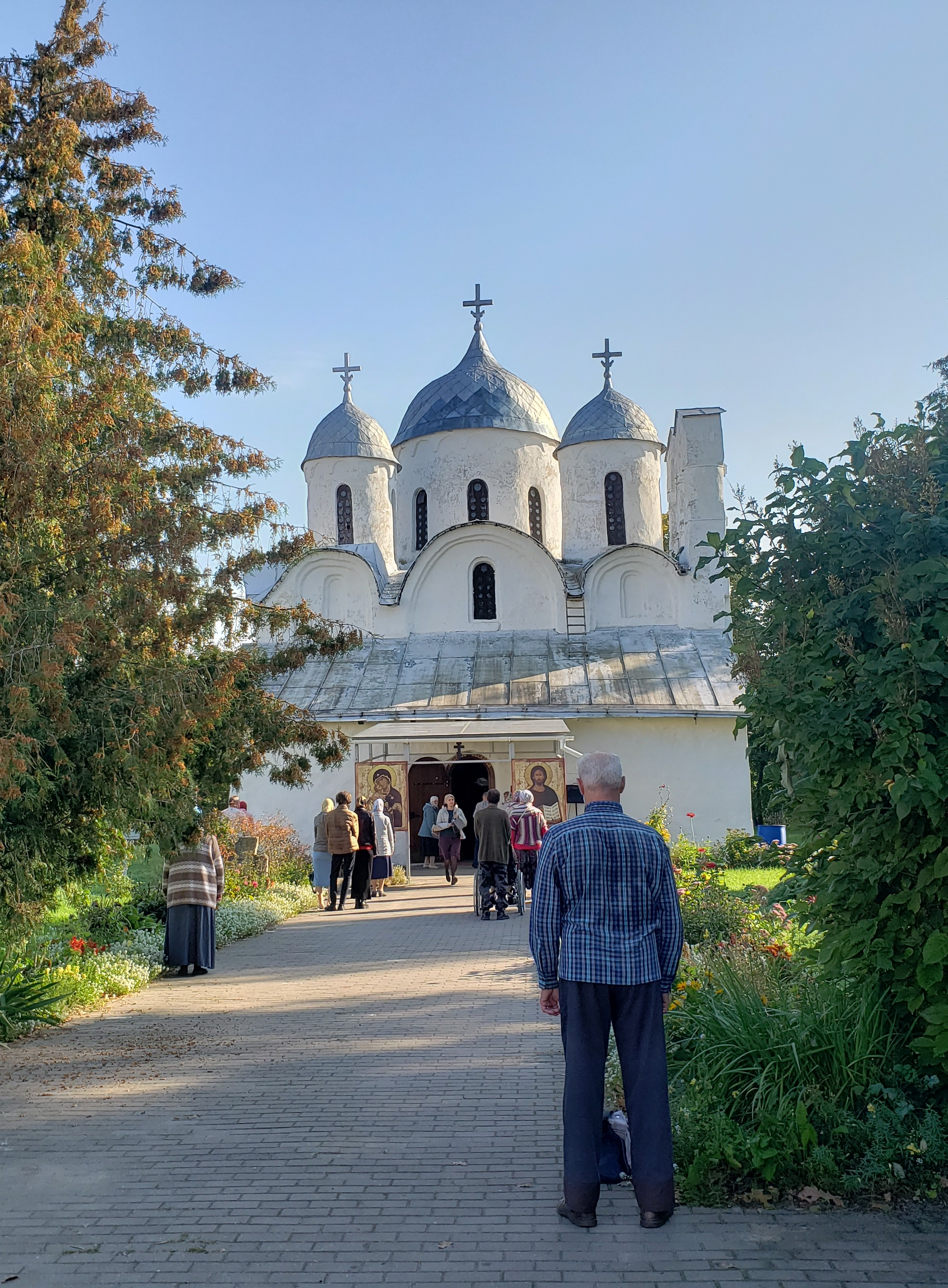
Worshipers outside a church during the feast day service in Pskov, Russia

The liturgical commemoration of the Beheading of St. John the Baptist is almost as old as that commemorating his birth, which is one of the oldest feasts, if not the oldest, introduced into both the Eastern and Western liturgies to honour a saint.

The Roman Catholic Church celebrates the feast on 29 August, as does the Lutheran Church. Many other churches of the Anglican Communion do so as well, including the Church of England, though some designate it a commemoration rather than a feast day.

The Eastern Orthodox and Byzantine Catholic churches also celebrate this feast on 29 August. This date in the Julian Calendar, used by the Russian, Macedonian, Serbian and Ethiopian Orthodox Churches, corresponds in the twenty-first century to 11 September in the Gregorian Calendar. The day is always observed with strict fasting, and in some cultures, the pious will not eat food from a flat plate, use a knife, or eat round food on this day.

The Armenian Apostolic Church commemorates the Decollation of St. John on the Saturday of Easter Week, while the Syriac Orthodox, Indian Orthodox, and Syro-Malankara Catholic Churches commemorate his death on 7 January.

== Related feasts ==
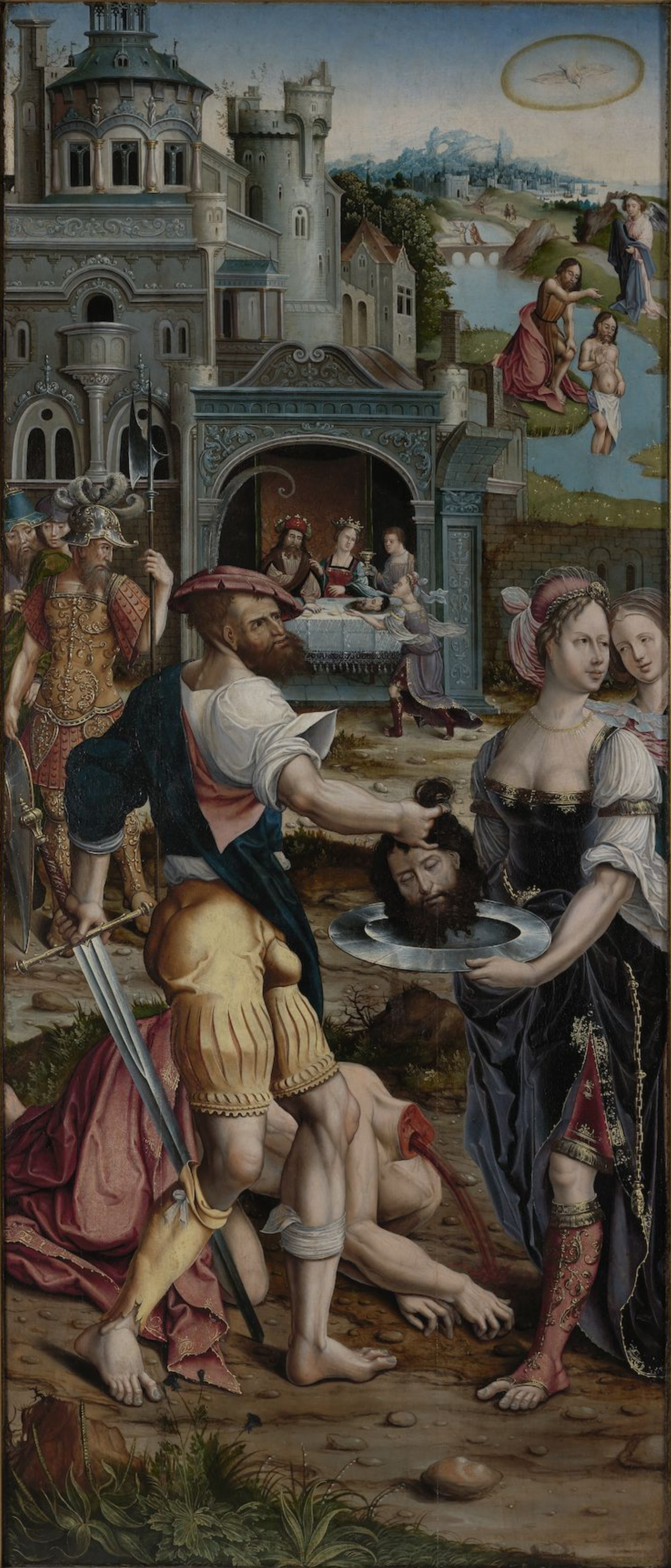
The Beheading of St John the Baptist by Jan Rombouts

There are two other related feasts observed by Eastern Christians:

- First and Second Findings of the Head of St. John the Baptist (24 February). According to church tradition, after the execution of John the Baptist, his disciples buried his body at Sebastia, except for his head, which Herodias took and buried in a dung heap. Later, Saint Joanna, who was married to Herod's steward, secretly took his head and buried it on the Mount of Olives, where it remained hidden for centuries.

The First Finding is said to have occurred in the fourth century. The property on the Mount of Olives where the head was buried eventually passed into the possession of a government official who became a monk with the name of Innocent. He built a church and a monastic cell there. When he started to dig the foundation, the vessel with the head of John the Baptist was uncovered, but fearful that the relic might be abused by unbelievers, he hid it again in the same place it had been found. Upon his death, the church fell into ruin and was destroyed.
The Second Finding is said to have occurred in the year 452. During the days of Constantine the Great, two monks on a pilgrimage to Jerusalem reportedly saw visions of John the Baptist, who revealed to them the location of his head. They uncovered the relic, placed it in a sack and proceeded home. Along the way, they encountered an unnamed potter and gave him the bag to carry, not telling him what it was. John the Baptist appeared to him and ordered him to flee from the careless and lazy monks with what he held in his hands. He did so and took the head home with him. Before his death, he placed it in a container and gave it to his sister. After some time, a hieromonk by the name of Eustathius, an Arian, came into possession of it, using it to attract followers to his teaching. He buried the head in a cave, near Emesa. Eventually, a monastery was built at that place. In the year 452, St. John the Baptist appeared to Archimandrite Marcellus of this monastery and indicated where his head was hidden in a water jar buried in the earth. The relic was brought into the city of Emesa and was later transferred to Constantinople.

- Third Finding of the Head of St. John the Baptist (25 May). The head was transferred to Comana of Cappadocia during a period of Muslim raids (about 820), and it was hidden in the ground during a period of iconoclastic persecution. When the veneration of icons was restored in 850, Patriarch Ignatius of Constantinople (847–857) saw in a vision the place where the head of St. John had been hidden. The patriarch communicated this to the emperor Michael III, who sent a delegation to Comana, where the head was found. Afterwards, the head was again transferred to Constantinople, and here, on 25 May, it was placed in a church at the court.

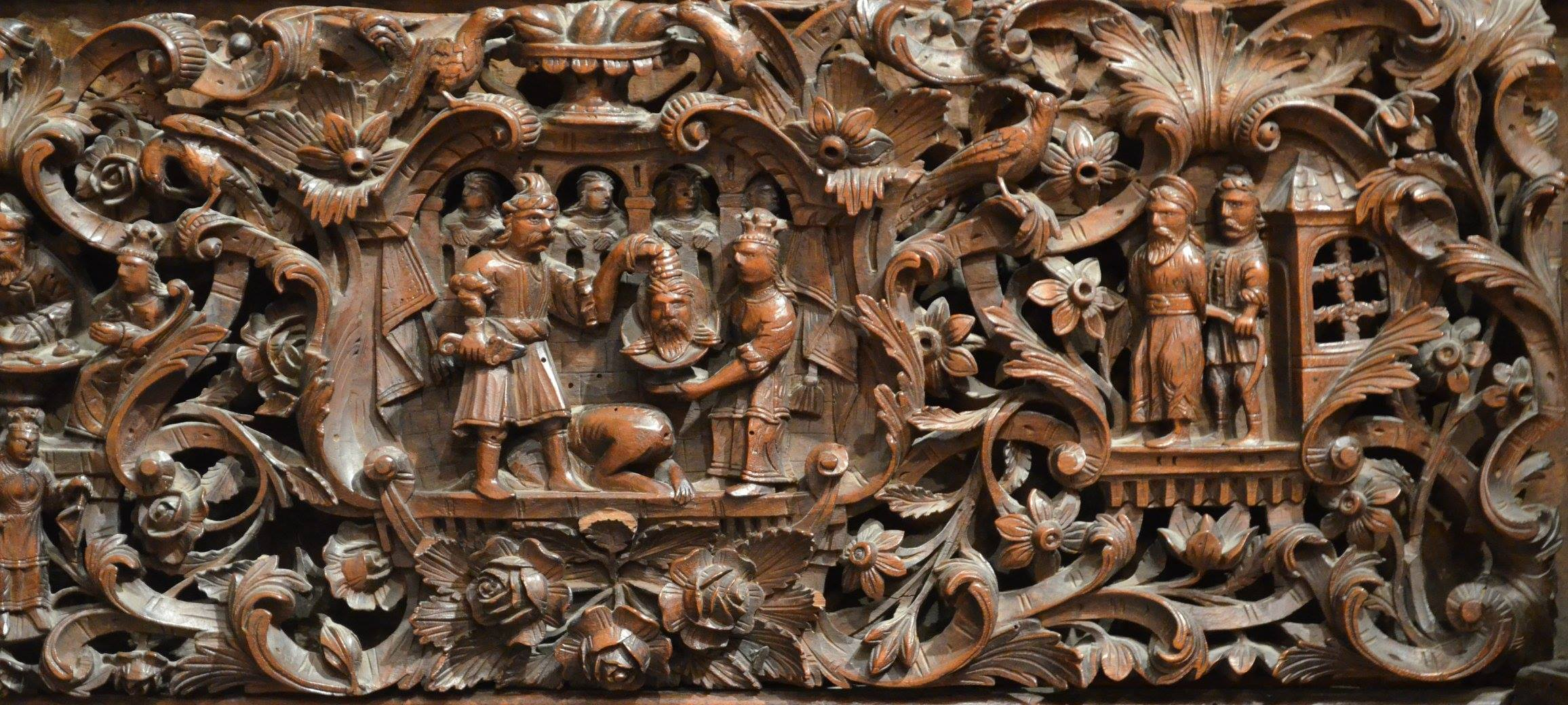
Iconostasis in the Church of the Ascension of Jesus, Skopje from 1867, Northern Macedonia. The Beheading of John the Baptist is carried out by figures stylized like Ottoman Turks.

== Relics ==
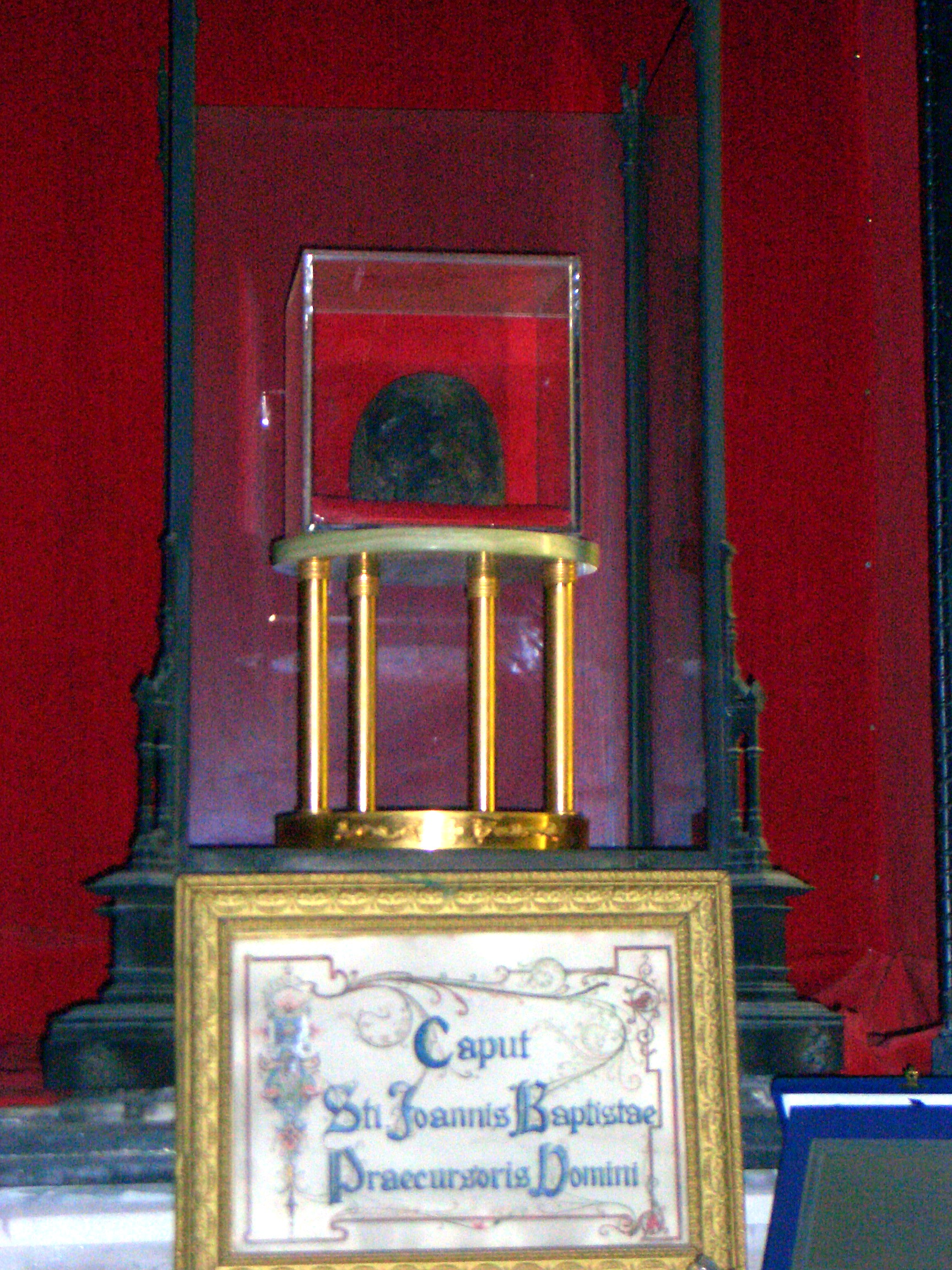
The purported head of Saint John the Baptist, enshrined in its own Roman side chapel in the San Silvestro in Capite, Rome

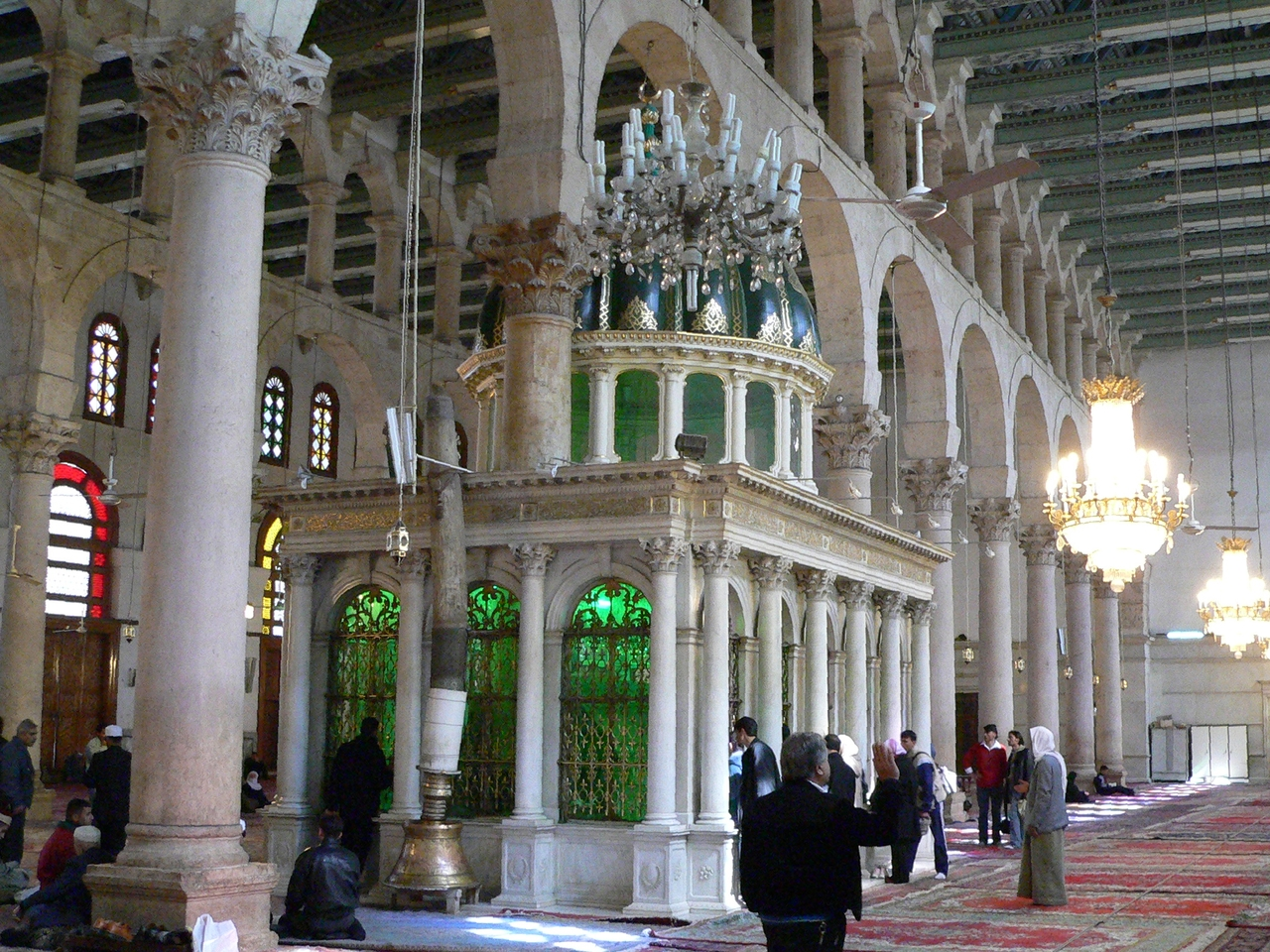
A Muslim shrine inside the Umayyad Mosque, in Damascus, Syria, purportedly houses the head of John the Baptist.

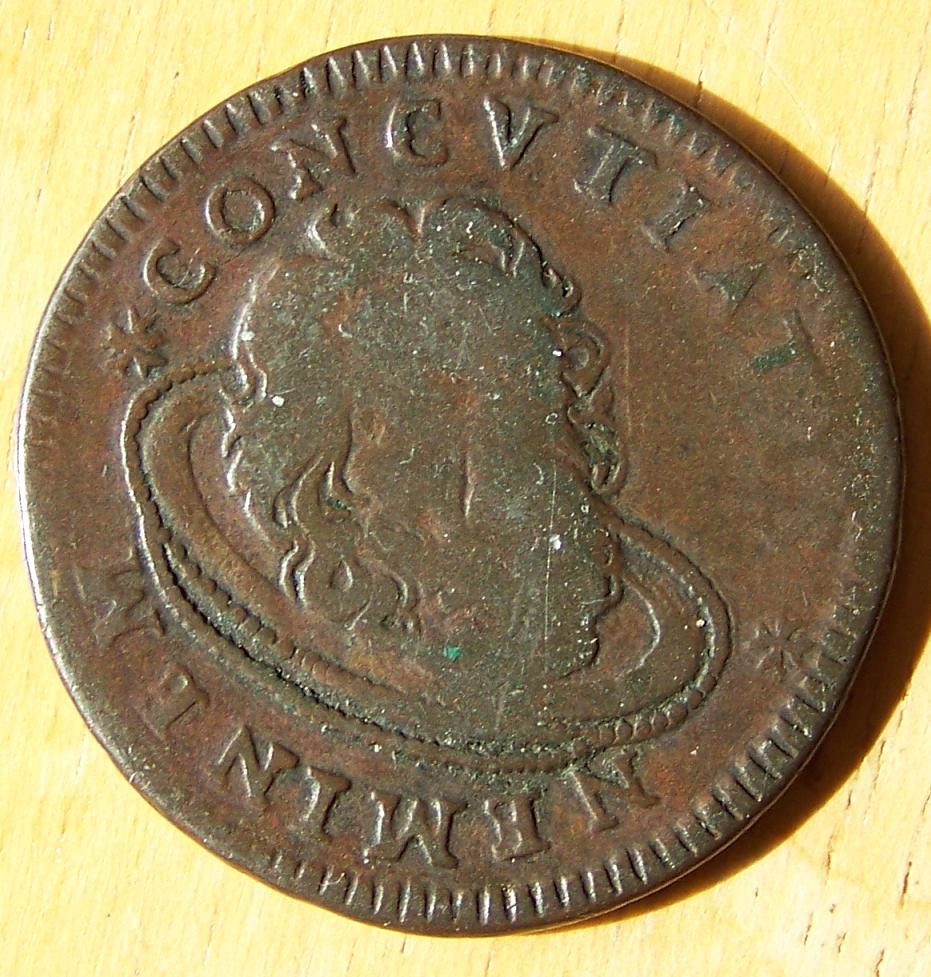
A 1742 Tarì coin of the Knights Hospitaller, depicting the head of Saint John the Baptist on a round silver platter.

John the Baptist is said to have been buried at the Palestinian village of Sebastia, near modern-day Nablus in the West Bank. Mention is made of his relics being honoured there in the fourth century. The historians Rufinus and Theodoretus record that the shrine was desecrated under Julian the Apostate around 362, the bones being partly burned. The tomb at Sebastia continued, nevertheless, to be visited by pious pilgrims, and St. Jerome bears witness to miracles being worked there. Today, the tomb is housed in the Nabi Yahya Mosque ("John the Baptist Mosque").

=== John the Baptist's head ===
What became of the head of John the Baptist is difficult to determine. Nicephorus and Symeon Metaphrastes say that Herodias had it buried in the fortress of Machaerus (in accordance with Josephus). Other writers say that it was interred in Herod's palace at Jerusalem; there, it was found during the reign of Constantine and thence secretly taken to Emesa, in Phoenicia, where it was concealed, the place remaining unknown for years, until it was manifested by a revelation in 453.

Over the centuries, there have been many discrepancies in the various legends and claimed relics throughout the world. Several different locations claim to possess the severed head of John the Baptist. Among the various claimants are:

- In medieval times, it was rumoured that the Knights Templar had possession of the head, and multiple records from their Inquisition in the early 14th century make reference to some form of head veneration.
- During the Crusaders' looting of Constantinople in 1204, Wallo or Walo(n) de Sarton, canon of Picquigny in Picardy, discovered a half-ball of transparent crystal on a silver plate that contained front facial bones of the skull without mandible. The Greek lettering around the plate indicated that the bones were from John the Baptist but he could not read Greek and so went from monastery to monastery trying to get information. Walon sold the plate in order to pay for his voyage back home, brought the relic and gave it to the bishop at Amiens. This made the Amiens Cathedral a major pilgrimage site in France, and was the main impetus for building the magnificent Gothic cathedral that still stands.
- At the beginning of the 17th century, there was some confusion about whose relics were venerated in the Basilica of Saint Sylvester the First: some claimed they were bones of St. John, the martyr of Rome, and the others claimed that they were the Baptist's. Pope Clement VIII, to remove all reasonable doubt, requested that the canons of Amiens provide a particle of the relics of St John for the basilica. In 1604, he was given a part of parietal bone that was inserted into a wax skull, and is still kept in the basilica. The Roman Catholic tradition holds that the bone on display in San Silvestro in Capite is a true relic of John the Baptist.
- The occipital bone of St John's skull is said to be kept at the Topkapı Palace Museum together with parts of the right hand.
- The Eastern Orthodox Church of John the Baptist in Jerusalem displays a purported fragment of the Skull of John the Baptist.
- A reliquary at the Residenz in Munich, Germany, is labelled as containing what previous Bavarian rulers thought was the skull of John the Baptist.
- It is also believed by some that a piece of his skull is held at the Romanian skete Prodromos on Mount Athos.
- Islamic tradition maintains that the head of Saint John the Baptist was interred in the once-called Basilica of Saint John the Baptist in Damascus, now the Umayyad Mosque. Pope John Paul II visited the Mosque during his visit to Syria in 2001.

=== John the Baptist's right arm ===
- According to some traditions, Luke the Evangelist went to the city of Sebastia, the place of John's burial site, from which he took the right hand of the Forerunner (the hand that baptized Jesus) and brought it to Antioch, his home city, where it performed miracles. It is reported that the relic would be brought out and shown to the faithful on the Feast of the Exaltation of the Cross (14 September). If the fingers of the hand were open, it was interpreted as a sign of a bountiful year; if the hand was closed, it would be a poor harvest (1 September was the beginning of the liturgical year and the harvest season).
- The arm is then said to have been transferred from Antioch to Constantinople in 956. On 7 January, the Orthodox Church celebrates the "Feast of the Transfer of the Right Hand of the Holy Forerunner" from Antioch to Constantinople and the Miracle of Saint John the Forerunner against the Hagarines at Chios.
  - In 1204, after the Sack of Constantinople by the Crusaders, the Frankish emperor Baldwin allegedly gave one bone from the wrist of Saint John the Baptist to Othon de Cicon, who in turn gave it to Cîteaux Abbey in France.
- Having been brought from Antioch to Constantinople at the time of Constantine VII, the arm was kept in the Emperor's chapel in the 12th century, then in the Church of the Virgin of the Pharos, then in the Church of Peribleptos in the first half of the 15th century. Spanish envoy Clavijo reported that he saw two different arms in two different monasteries while on a visit to Constantinople in 1404.
- When the Ottomans conquered Constantinople in 1453, they seized possession of the relic. In 1484, Sultan Bayezid II sent it to the knights of Rhodes, who held his brother Cem captive in order to obtain the relic back. Two different accounts then exist as to the fate of the relic:
  - The Turks allege that in 1585, Sultan Murad III managed to retrieve a part of the relic from the Christian Knights and had the arm brought back to Constantinople (presently Istanbul, Turkey), where it remains up to this day at the Topkapı Palace. The arm is kept in a gold-embellished silver reliquary. There are several inscriptions on the arm: "The beloved of God" on the forefinger, "This is the hand of the Baptist" on the wrist, and "belongs to monk Dolin" on the band above the elbow.
  - The Orthodox Christians, nonetheless, claim that, when in 1798 Napoleon conquered the island of Malta, then the Knight's siege, John's arm was one of the few treasures that Grand Master Ferdinand von Hompesch was allowed to take with him. On 12 October 1799, after the resignation of Hompesch, it was presented to Russian emperor Paul I, who had been elected the new Grand Master of the Order, and taken to the chapel of the Priory Palace at Gatchina in Russia. After the Bolshevik Revolution of 1917, Eastern Orthodox Church authorities had it transferred from the church in Gatchina to the Ostrog Monastery in Montenegro, and from there to its current location at Cetinje Monastery, also in Montenegro, where it is displayed up to this day.
  - The right hand of John the Baptist that is kept in Siena Cathedral (in the chapel in the north arm of the transept) was acquired by the first Serbian archbishop Saint Sava, as testified by the inscription on the reliquary, sometime after the fall of Constantinople. It was kept in the Žiča monastery, and around 1290, when warfare made the northern areas of Serbia unsafe, transferred to the newly established archiepiscopal see of the Serbian Orthodox Church at Peć. From there it was presumably relocated by Helena, daughter of the last Byzantine emperor, Constantine XI Palaiologos and widow of the despot of Serbia, Lazar Branković, either to Constantinople or directly to her uncle Thomas Palaiologos, despot of the Morea, who fled to Italy in 1461 and sold his whole collection of relics to Pope Pius II. The pope bequeathed the hand to Siena Cathedral in 1464. A special chapel was built for it. The relic is displayed only once a year, on Whit Monday.

Other purported relics include:

- It has also been claimed that a fragment of the right forearm is kept at the Dionysiou Monastery on Mount Athos, Greece. At the beginning of the 19th century, the advisor to Prussia in Constantinople, John Frangopoulos, was in possession of this relic, and he adorned it with jewels. On 10 March 1802, it was brought to Dionysiou Monastery through the efforts of its abbot, Joachim Agiostratiti.
- Relics of John the Baptist are said to be in the possession of the Coptic Orthodox Monastery of Saint Macarius the Great in Scetes, Egypt.
- Aachen Cathedral, in Germany, contains a robe supposedly worn by John the Baptist, adored as a relic.
- In July 2010, a small reliquary was discovered under the ruins of a 5th-century monastery on St. Ivan Island, Bulgaria. Local archaeologists opened the reliquary in August and found bone fragments of a skull, a hand and a tooth, which they believe belong to John the Baptist, based on their interpretation of a Greek inscription on the reliquary. The Bulgarian Orthodox bishop who witnessed the opening speculated that the relics might have been a gift from an 11th-century church on the island possibly dedicated to the saint. The remains have been carbon-dated to the 1st century.
- A reliquary with a purported finger of Saint John the Baptist is displayed in the Nelson-Atkins Museum of Art in Kansas City, Missouri.

On 29 August 2012, during a public audience at the summer palace of Castel Gandolfo, Pope Benedict XVI mentioned the traditional crypt in the Palestinian town of Sebastia, where relics of the Baptist have been venerated since at least the fourth century. The Pope also noted that a religious feast particularly commemorates the transfer of John's head relic to the Basilica of San Silvestro in Capite in Rome.

== Biblical commentary ==
The Catholic German theologian, Friedrich Justus Knecht wrote that:

St. John died a martyr to his calling. Having been called by God to be a preacher of penance, he represented Herod's sin to him, and reminded him of the law of God. On this account he died a violent death at the age of thirty-two. To him applies the eighth beatitude: "Blessed are they who suffer persecution, for justice' sake." His soul passed directly into Limbo, where he, like St. Joseph, awaited the arrival of the Messias, and the speedy accomplishment of the work of Redemption. When our Lord ascended into heaven, he was taken up with Him into everlasting happiness. The Church honours him as a great Saint, and on the 24th of June celebrates his nativity, because he was born without original sin.

The subsequent history of Herod and Salome is related in the great commentary of Cornelius a Lapide:

Wherefore the just vengeance of God burned against all who were concerned in this crime. Herod was defeated by Aretas. Afterwards he was banished with Herodias to Lyons, and deprived of his tetrarchy and everything by Caligula, at the instigation of Herod Agrippa, the brother of Herodias, as Josephus relates (xvii. 10). Moreover, the head of the dancing daughter was cut off by means of ice. Hear what Nicephorus says, "As she was journeying once in the winter-time, and a frozen river had to be crossed on foot, the ice broke beneath her, not without the providence of God. Straightway she sank down up to her neck. This made her dance and wriggle about with all the lower parts of her body, not on land, but in the water. Her wicked head was glazed with ice, and at length severed from her body by the sharp edges, not of iron, but of the frozen water. Thus in the very ice she displayed the dance of death, and furnished a spectacle to all who beheld it, which brought to mind what she had done.

== Depictions of Salome, Herod, and the death of John the Baptist ==
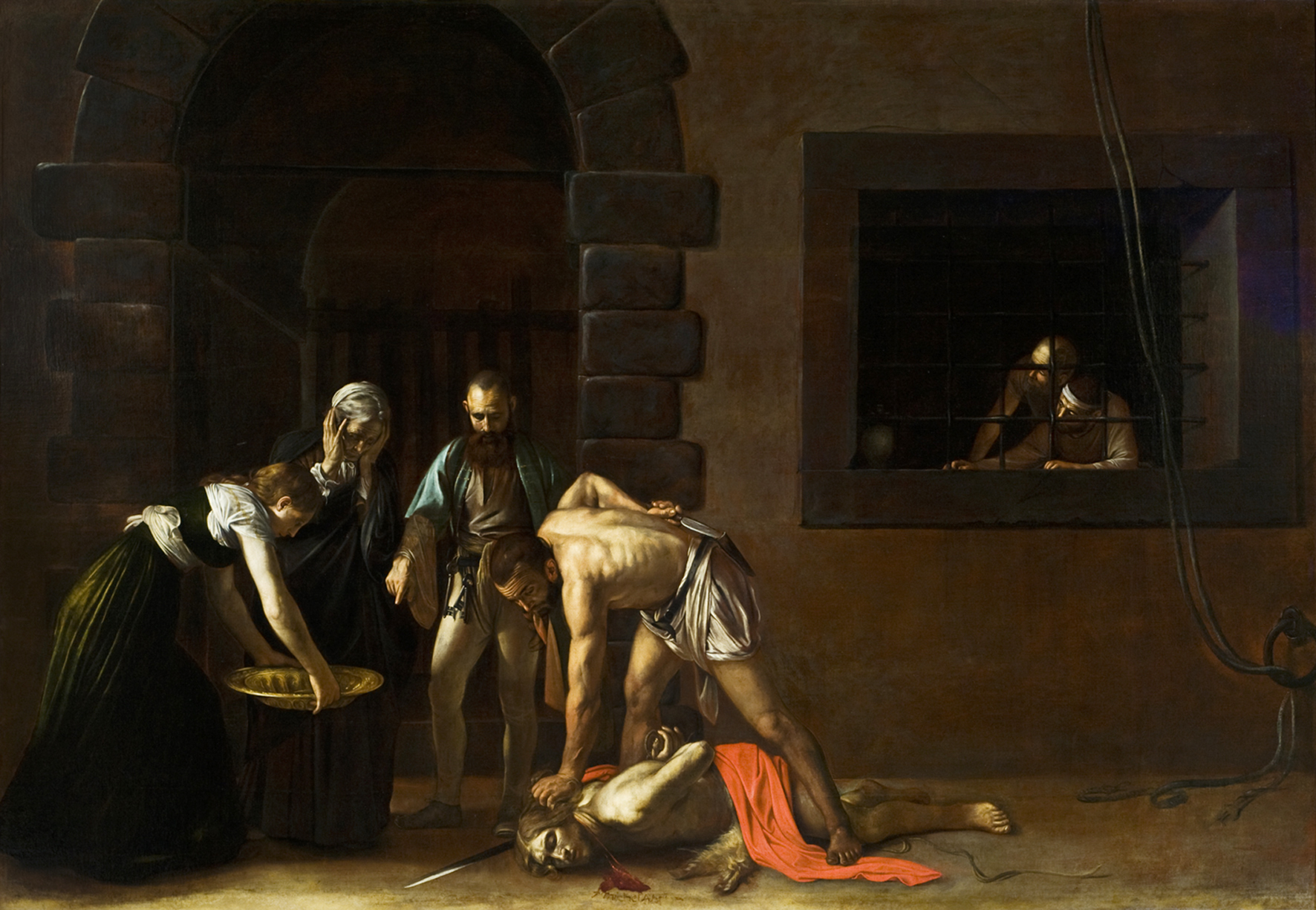
The Beheading of Saint John the Baptist, 1608 (Valletta Co-Cathedral, Malta)

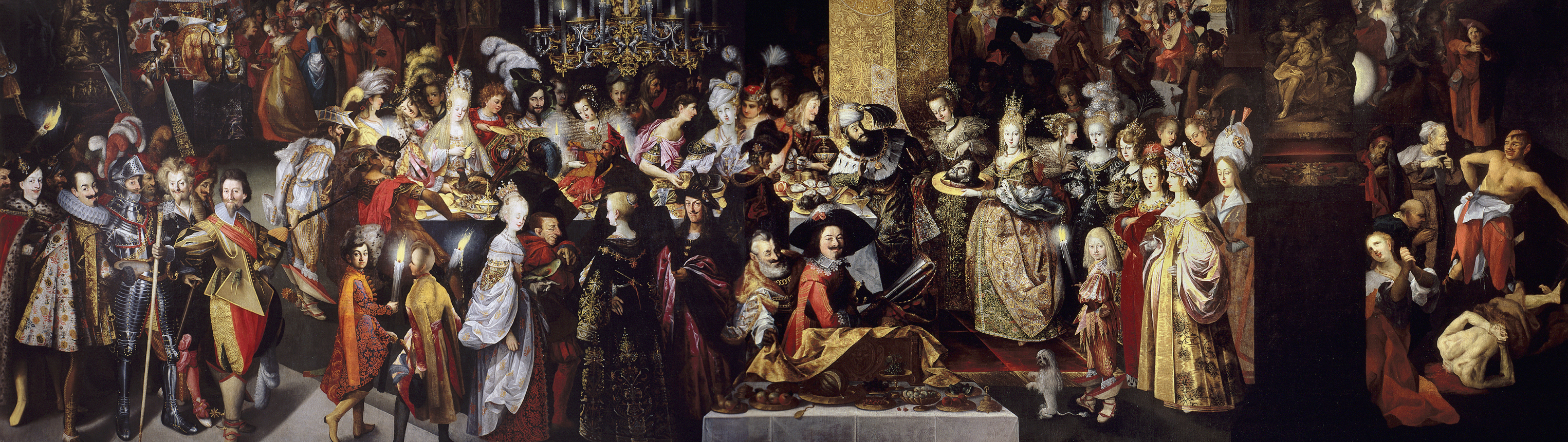
Feast of Herod with the Beheading of St John the Baptist by Bartholomeus Strobel in the Prado Museum in Madrid. The painting is almost 10 metres wide.

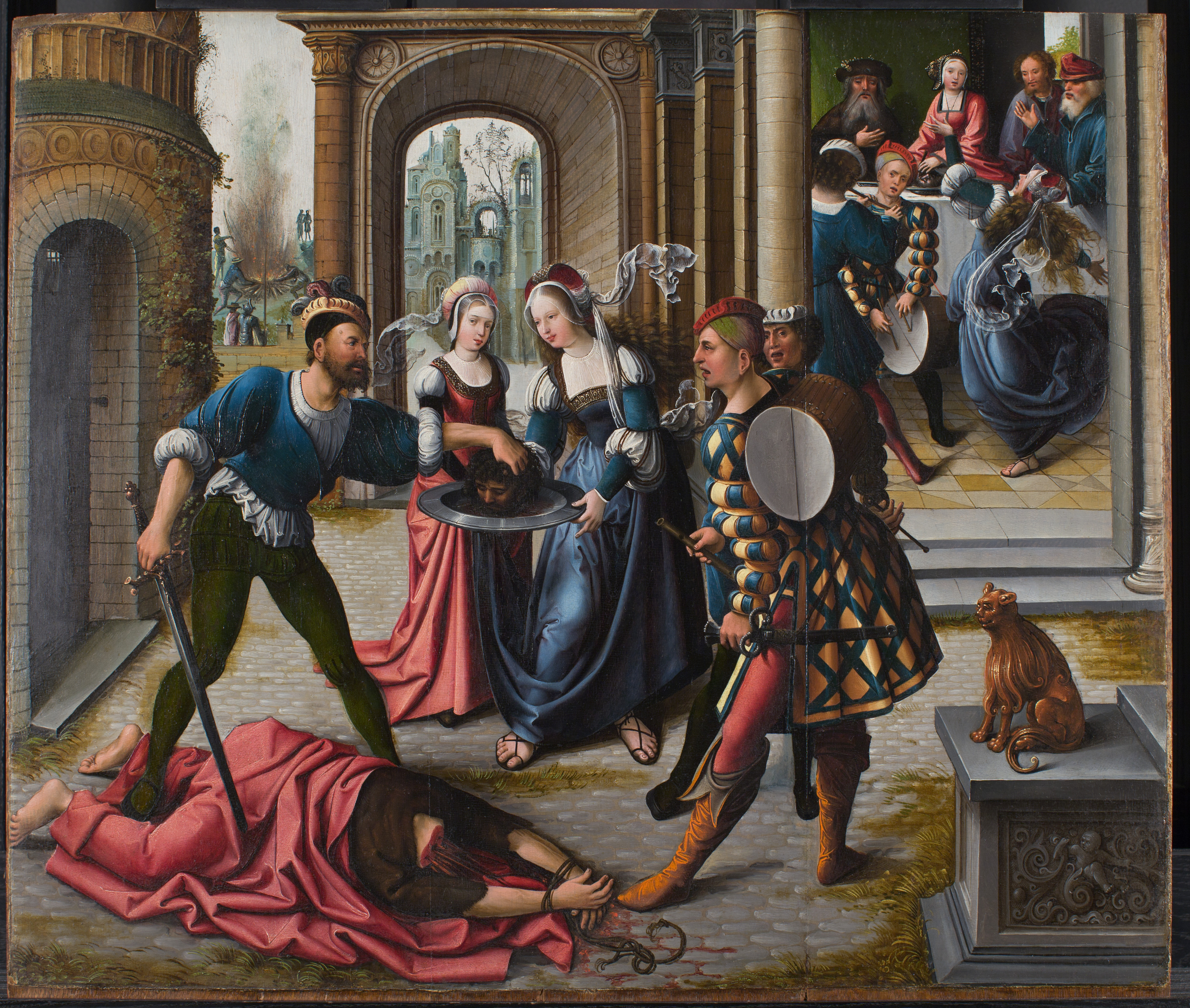
The Martyrdom of Saint John the Baptist by Bernard van Orley, with Salome dancing during the banquet of Herod in the background

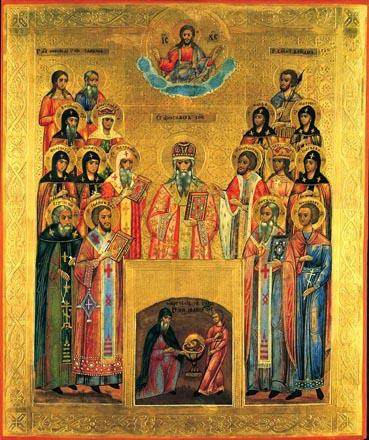
Icon of the Third Finding of the Head of John the Forerunner (the end of 19th century, Russia)

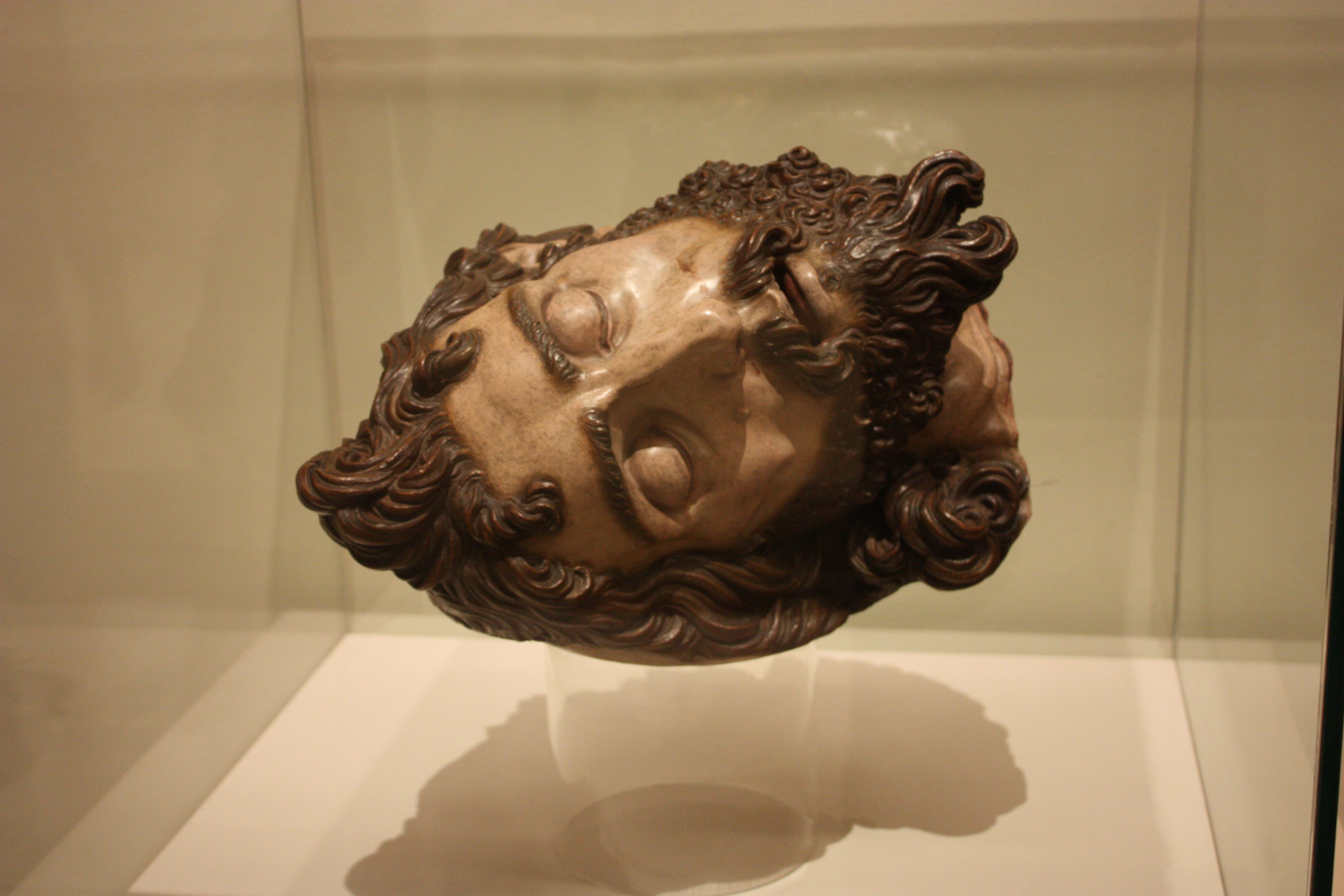
Head of John the Baptist (Gaspar Nuñez Delgado), Museum of Fine Arts of Seville

Scenes from the events around the death of John were an extremely common subject in the treatment of John the Baptist in art, initially most often in small predella scenes, and later as a subject for larger independent works. These also include the subsequent Feast of Herod. The following list does not attempt completeness but begins with works with their own articles, then includes many of the best-known depictions in chronological order (to see each work, follow the link through the footnote):

With articles

- Herod's Banquet, Donatello, 1427
- The Beheading of Saint John the Baptist, Giovanni di Paolo, 1455–1460, Art Institute of Chicago
- Salome with the Head of Saint John the Baptist, Titian, c. 1515, Galleria Doria Pamphilj, Rome
- Salome with the Head of John the Baptist, Caravaggio, c. 1607–1610, National Gallery, London
- Salome with the Head of John the Baptist, Caravaggio, c. 1609, Palacio Real, Madrid
- The Beheading of Saint John the Baptist, Caravaggio, 1608, Valletta Co-Cathedral, Malta
- Feast of Herod with the Beheading of St John the Baptist, Bartholomeus Strobel, c. 1630–43, Prado

Other

- Herod's Feast, Daurade Monastery, c. 1100, Musée des Augustins, Toulouse.
- Death of John the Baptist, Gilabertus, Saint-Etienne Cathedral, 1120–1140, Musee des Augustins, Toulouse
- Feast of Herod, Giotto di Bondone, 1320
- The Feast of Herod and the Beheading of the Baptist, Giovanni Baronzio, c. 1330–1335, Metropolitan Museum of Art
- Entombment of the Baptist, Andrea Pisano, 1330
- St. John the Evangelist and Stories from His Life, Giovanni del Biondo, 1360–70
- Feast of Herod, Spinello Aretino, 1385
- The Banquet of Herod, Lorenzo Monaco, c. 1400
- The Beheading of St. John the Baptist, Masaccio, 1426
- Banquet of Herod, Masolino da Panicale, 1435
- Herod's Banquet, Fra Filippo Lippi, 1452–65
- The Head of John the Baptist Brought to Herod, Giovanni di Paolo, 1454, National Gallery, London
- The Feast of Herod and the Beheading of Saint John the Baptist, Benozzo Gozzoli, 1461–62, National Gallery of Art
- The Head of St John the Baptist, Giovanni Bellini, 1464–68
- The Beheading of St. John the Baptist, Lieven van Lathem, 1469, The J. Paul Getty Museum
- Herod's Feast, Heydon, Norfolk, c. 1470, wall painting in an English parish church
- St. John Altarpiece, Hans Memling, 1474–79
- Beheading of John the Baptist, Andrea del Verrocchio, 1477–80
- Salome with the Head of St. John the Baptist, Sandro Botticelli, 1488, Uffizi, Florence
- Salome with the Head of John the Baptist, Cornelis Engelbrechtsz, c. 1490, J. Paul Getty Museum
- The Head of St. John the Baptist, with Mourning Angels and Putti, Jan Mostaert, early 16th century, National Gallery, London
- St. John Altarpiece (left wing), Quentin Massys, 1507–08
- The Beheading of St. John, Albrecht Dürer, 1510, Christian Theological Seminary, Indianapolis
- The Daughter of Herodias, Sebastiano del Piombo, 1510, National Gallery, London
- Salome, Tilman Riemenschneider, 1500–1510
- Salome, Casare da Sesta, 1510–20, National Gallery, London
- Salome, Giampietrino, c. 1510–30, National Gallery, London
- The Head of St. John the Baptist Brought to Herod, Albrecht Dürer, 1511
- Salome, Alonso Berruguete, 1512–16, Uffizi Gallery, Florence
- The Beheading of Saint John the Baptist, Hans Fries, 1514, Kunstmuseum Basel
- The Martyrdom of Saint John the Baptist, Bernard van Orley, c. 1514–1515, Metropolitan Museum of Art
- Salome with the Head of John the Baptist, Titian, c. 1515
- Head of John the Baptist, Hans Baldung Grien, 1516, National Gallery of Art
- Salome with the Head of John the Baptist, Jacob Cornelisz van Oostsanen, Rijksmuseum, Amsterdam
- Herodias, Bernardino Luini, 1527–31
- Salome, Lucas Cranach the Elder, c. 1530
- Beheading of John the Baptist, Vincenzo Danti, 1569–70
- Salome, Giovanni Battista Caracciolo, 1615–20
- The Feast of Herod, Frans Francken the Younger, c. 1620, State Hermitage Museum
- Head of Saint John the Baptist, Juan de Mesa (ca. 1625) Seville Cathedral
- Herodias with the Head of St. John the Baptist, Francesco del Cairo, c. 1625–30
- The Beheading of John the Baptist, Matthaeus Merrian the Elder, 1625–30
- Decapitation of St. John, Unknown British, 17th century, Tate Gallery
- Salome Dancing before Herod, Jacob Hogers, c. 1630–55, Rijksmuseum
- Salome Presented with the Head of St. John the Baptist, Leonaert Bramer, 1630s
- The Beheading of St. John the Baptist, Massimo Stanzione, c. 1634
- Salome Receives the Head of John the Baptist, Guercino, 1637, Museum of Fine Arts of Rennes, French Wikipedia page
- Salome with the Head of John the Baptist, Guido Reni, 1639–40
- The Beheading of John the Baptist, Rembrandt, 1640, The Fine Arts Museums of San Francisco
- The Beheading of John the Baptist, Rombout van Troyen, 1650s, State Hermitage Museum
- St John Reproaching Herod, Mattia Preti, 1662–66
- St John the Baptist Before Herod, Mattia Preti, 1665
- Decapitation of St John, British School, 17th century, Tate Gallery
- John the Baptist Beheaded, Julius Schnorr von Carolsfeld, 1851–60, World Mission Collection
- The Daughter of Herodias Receiving the Head of John the Baptist, Gustave Doré, 1865
- Head of St. John the Baptist, Jean-Baptiste Chatigny, 1869, The J. Paul Getty Museum
- The Beheading of John the Baptist, Pierre Puvis de Chavannes, c. 1869, National Gallery, London
- Salome, Henri Regnault, 1870, Metropolitan Museum of Art
- Gustave Moreau:
  - Salome Dancing before Herod, 1874–76
  - The Apparition, 1874–76
  - Salome, 1876
- Hérodias, Gustave Flaubert, 1877
- James Tissot, 1886–96:
  - The Daughter of Herodias Dancing
  - King Herod
  - The Head of John the Baptist on a Platter
- Salome, Franz von Stuck, 1906
- Salome, Nikolai Astrup
- Salome With the Head of John the Baptist, Aubrey Beardsley,

== See also ==
- Chronology of Jesus
- Church of the Beheading of Saint John the Baptist of Saulnot
- Messengers from John the Baptist

== Notes ==
Beheading of John the Baptist Life of Jesus: Ministry
Preceded by Rejection of Jesus; Ministry of Jesus	New Testament; Events	Succeeded by To bring a Sword; Ministry of Jesus
