= The Feast of Herod =

Episode in the Gospels

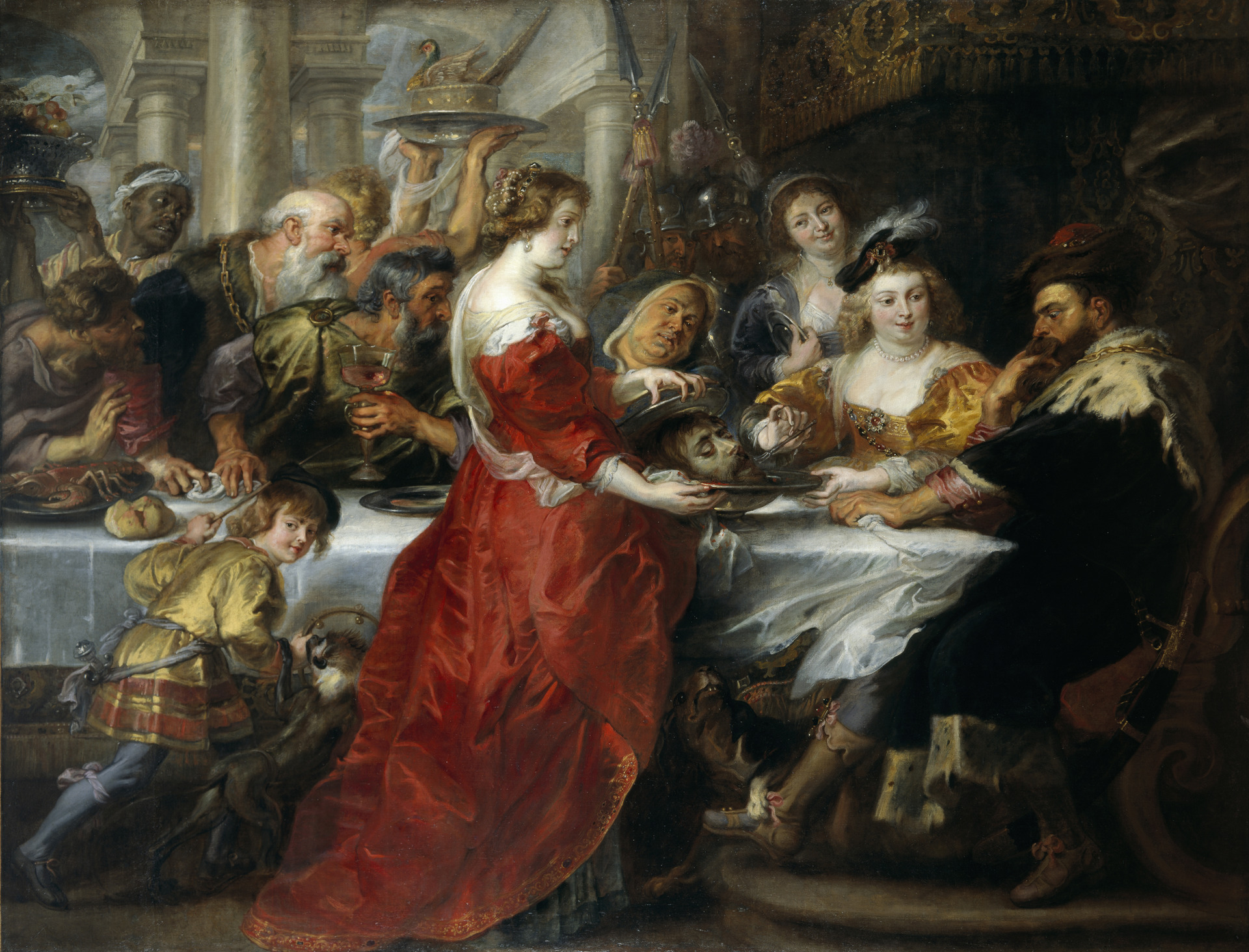
Rubens, c. 1635, National Gallery of Scotland

The Feast of Herod refers to the episode in the Gospels following the Beheading of John the Baptist, when Salome presents his head to her parents, and is the subject of several artistic works.

== Biblical story ==
The account in the Book of Mark describes Herod Antipas holding a banquet on his birthday for his high officials and military commanders, and leading men of Galilee. At this banquet, Herod's daughter dances before Herod, who is pleased and offers her anything she asks for in return. The girl asks her mother what she should request, and she is told to demand the head of John the Baptist. Reluctantly, Herod orders the beheading of John, and John's head is delivered to her, at her request, "on a platter." (Mark 6:17–29)

== Artistic depictions ==
Numerous artistic depictions of the event have been made. Usually the moment shown is the arrival of the head on the platter at the table, carried by Salome. Sometimes the execution itself is shown as a subsidiary scene. The dance of Salome is less often shown before the 19th century; it became more popular after Oscar Wilde's play Salome of 1891, which invented the term Dance of the Seven Veils. In the 16th-century, Salome carrying the head, usually with her maid, became a popular subject, usually called Salome with the Head of John the Baptist, led by Titian's depiction of c. 1515, and with different depictions by Caravaggio in London and in Madrid. Depictions of the main feast include:

- Peruzzi Chapel, the third fresco in a series of Scenes from the Life of St John the Baptist by Giotto, c. 1320
- The Feast of Herod (Donatello), a bronze relief sculpture by Donatello, c. 1427
- The Feast of Herod (Giovanni di Paolo), a tempera painting by Giovanni di Paolo, c. 1453
- The Feast of Herod (Gozzoli), a tempera painting by Benozzo Gozzoli, c. 1461
- A fresco in the cycle Stories of St. Stephen and St. John the Baptist by Filippo Lippi in Prato Cathedral
- Feast of Herod with the Beheading of St John the Baptist, by Bartholomeus Strobel, early 17th century (Prado)
- The Feast of Herod (Rubens), an oil painting by Peter Paul Rubens, c. 1635
- Salome Dancing before Herod, Gustave Moreau, 1876
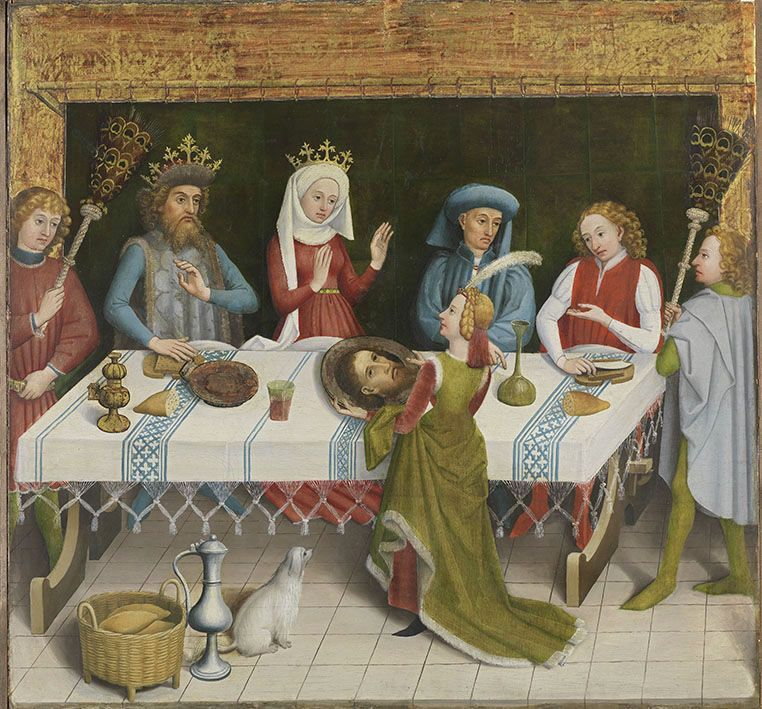
German, 1462

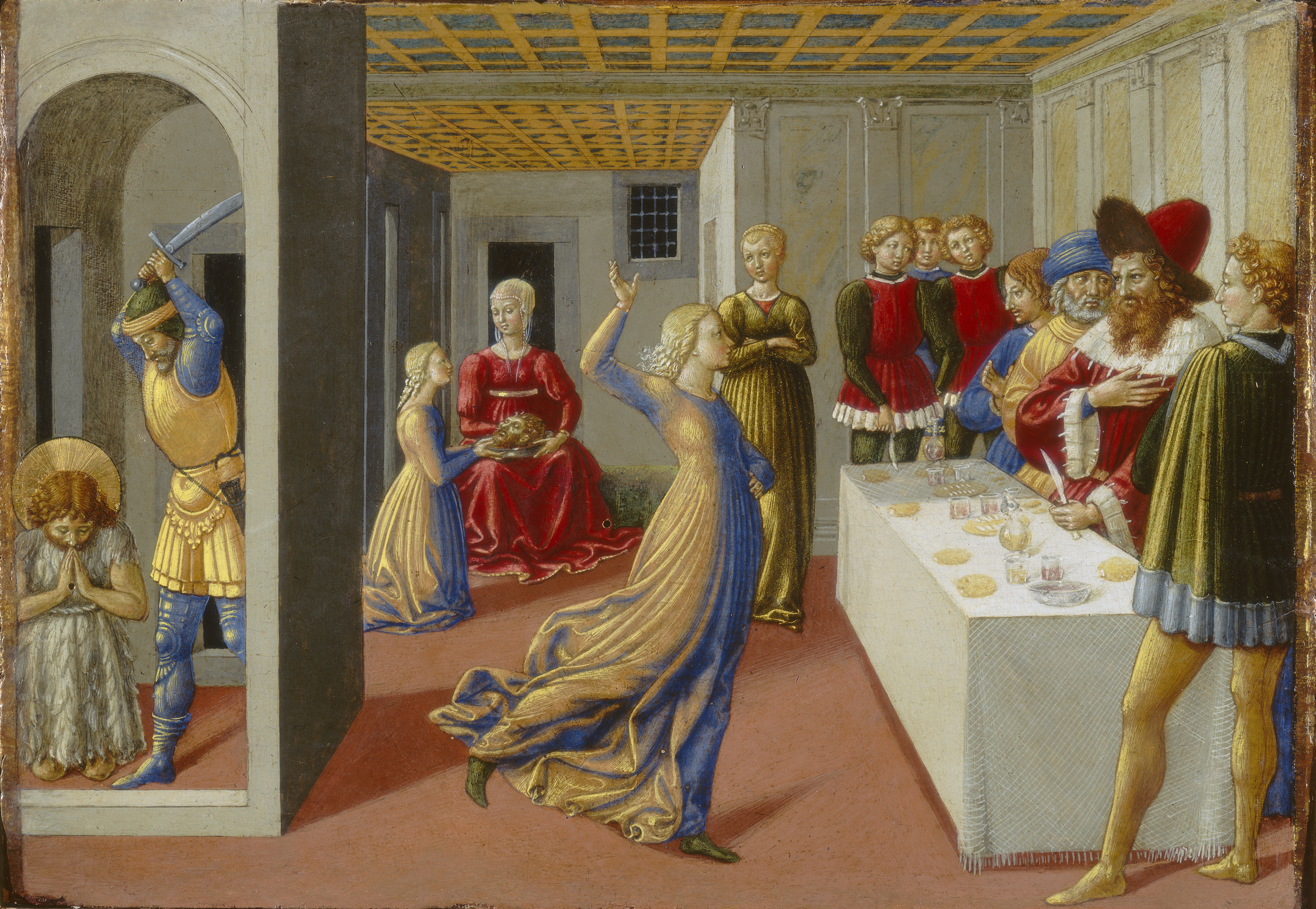
Benozzo Gozzoli, The Feast of Herod and the Beheading of Saint John the Baptist, 1461-1462, NGA

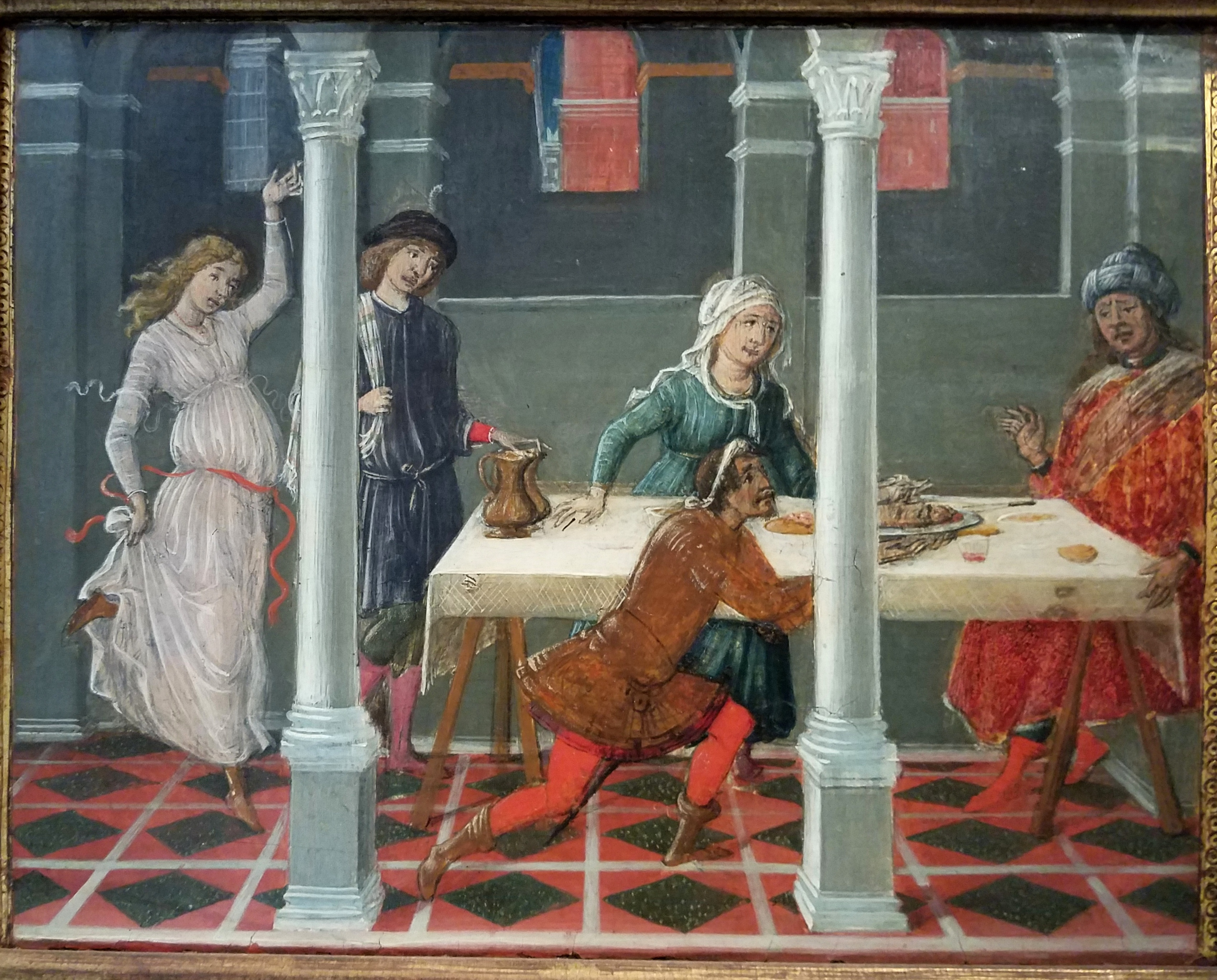
The Dance of Salome, Matteo di Giovanni, c. 1480

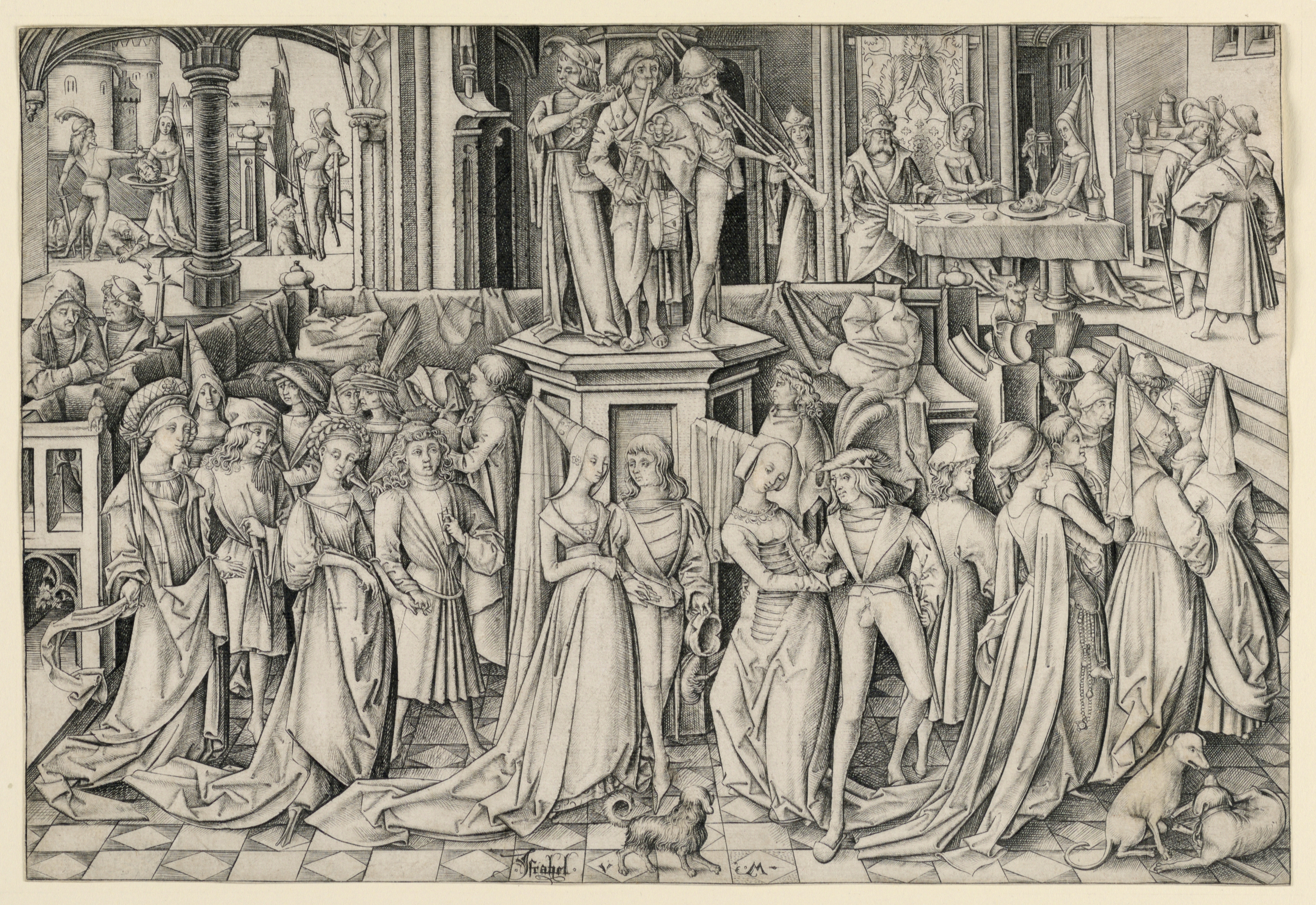
Engraving by Israhel van Meckenem, c. 1490. The diners and execution are background scenes.

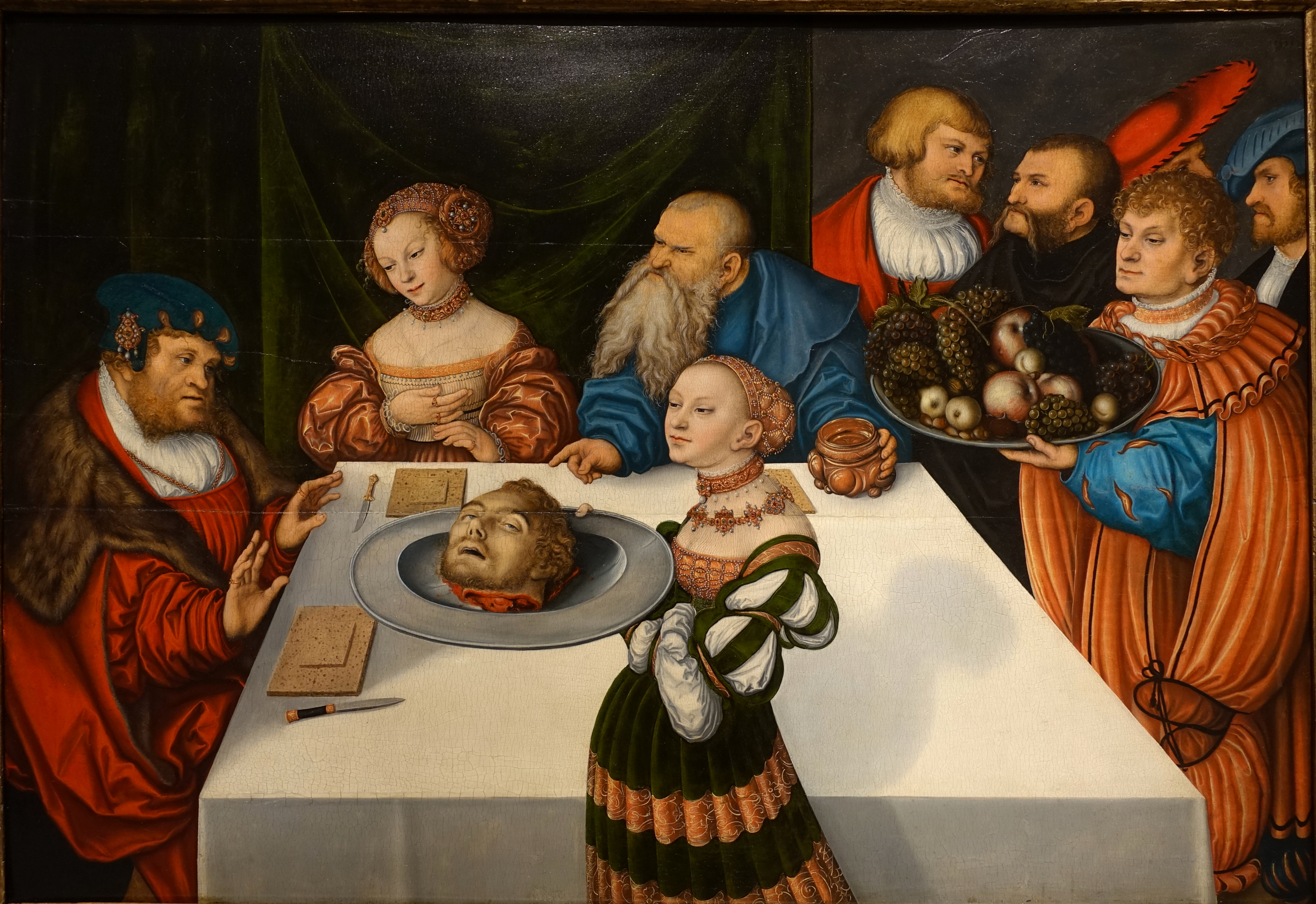
Lucas Cranach the Elder, 1531

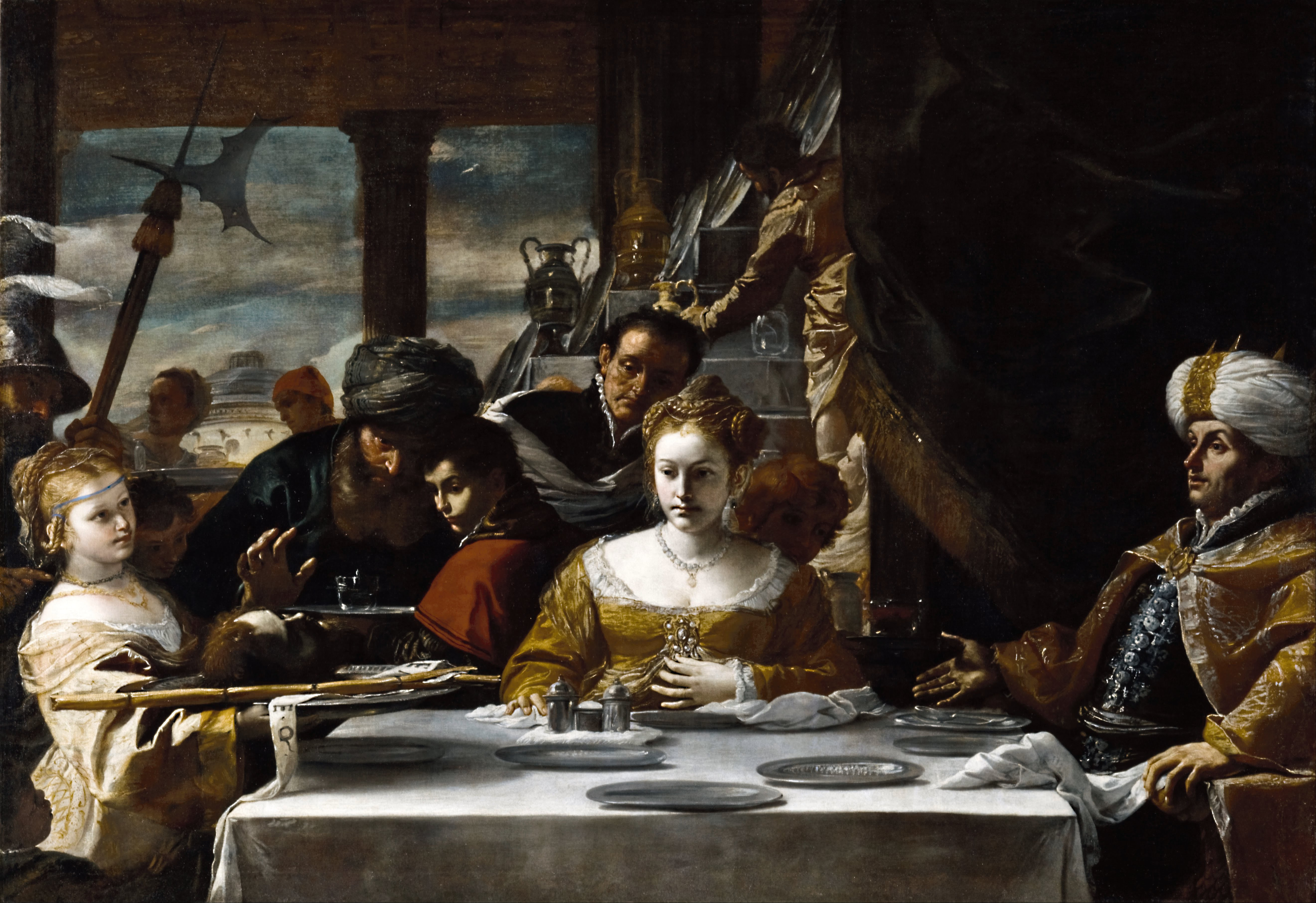
Mattia Preti, 1650s
