= The Banquet of Absalom =

Painting by Mattia Preti

The Banquet of Absalom (c. 1660-1665) by Mattia Preti

The Banquet of Absalom (Italian: Convito di Assalonne) is an oil on canvas painting by Mattia Preti, created in c. 1660–1665, now in the Museo nazionale di Capodimonte in Naples. It illustrates a passage from chapters 13 and 14 of 2 Samuel in the Old Testament, in which King David's son Absalom avenges the rape of Absalom's sister Tamar two years earlier by inviting her rapist Amnon to a feast, getting him drunk and then killing him.

== History ==
Banquets were a common motif in Preti's mature phase, after he had admired Peter Paul Rubens' The Feast of Herod in the Roomer and then Vandeneynden collections during his time in Naples. It also shows heavy Venetian influence, with Rolf Schott in 1910 calling it "a murder in the Neapolitan style set in a banquet in Veronese's style". Absalom is dated by similarities to The Conversion of Saint Paul in the cappella di Francia in St John's Co-Cathedral in Valletta on Malta, probably placing the former work in his early years on Malta. The first written reference to the work is by Bernardo De Dominici, who saw it in the Sanseverino family collection in Naples alongside other Preti works such as Belshazzar's Feast (now also in Capodimonte) and David Playing the Harp Before Saul (now in a private collection in New York,) with the latter more recently identified as the pendant to Absalom.

After 1745 Absalom was recorded in the Colonna di Stigliano family collection, seemingly having reached it from the Vandeneynden collection when Ferdinand van den Eynde's daughter Giovanna married Giuliano Colonna of Stigliano family in 1688 - she also inherited from her father Palazzo Zevallos, renamed Palazzo Colonna di Stigliano after her marriage. In 1906 the Italian state bought Absalom and Belshazzar's Feast from princess Cecilia Colonna di Stigliano (granddaughter of Andrea Colonna di Stigliano, 1st Prince of Stigliano, himself grandson of Giovanna's son Ferdinando Colonna of Stigliano, 2nd Prince of Sonnino) and placed them both in their present home.

== Bibliography ==
- Spinosa, Nicola (1999). Mattia Preti. Tra Roma, Napoli e Malta (in Italian). Naples: Electa. ISBN 978-8851001292.
- Spinosa, Nicola (2010). Pittura del Seicento a Napoli: da Mattia Preti a Luca Giordano, natura in posa (in Italian). Naples: Arte'm.
