= Feast of Herod with the Beheading of St John the Baptist =

Painting by Bartholomeus Strobel the Younger

The Feast of Herod with the Beheading of St John the Baptist is a large painting by the Silesian artist Bartholomeus Strobel the Younger (1591 – about 1650) which is now displayed in the Museo del Prado in Madrid. In oil on canvas, it measures 2.80 by 9.52 metres (9 ft 2 in × 31 ft 3 in), and is variously dated between about 1630 and 1643.

The painting shows two scenes from the biblical account of the death of John the Baptist. The main part of the painting, on the left, shows the banquet of Herod Antipas at which his daughter Salome produced the head of John the Baptist. The much smaller execution scene is shown on the right hand side, to the right of the column dividing the picture space. The Beheading of John the Baptist had often been combined with the Feast of Herod in this way, with the execution relegated to a different space at the side of the image, a pattern Strobel takes to an extreme.

The figures include many portraits of leading figures of the Thirty Years' War, and probably other less well known court figures, not all so far identified, or with agreed identifications. It has been interpreted as an allegorical "appeal to the Christian world to save [Strobel's] doomed home country" of Silesia, which had suffered greatly from the wars.

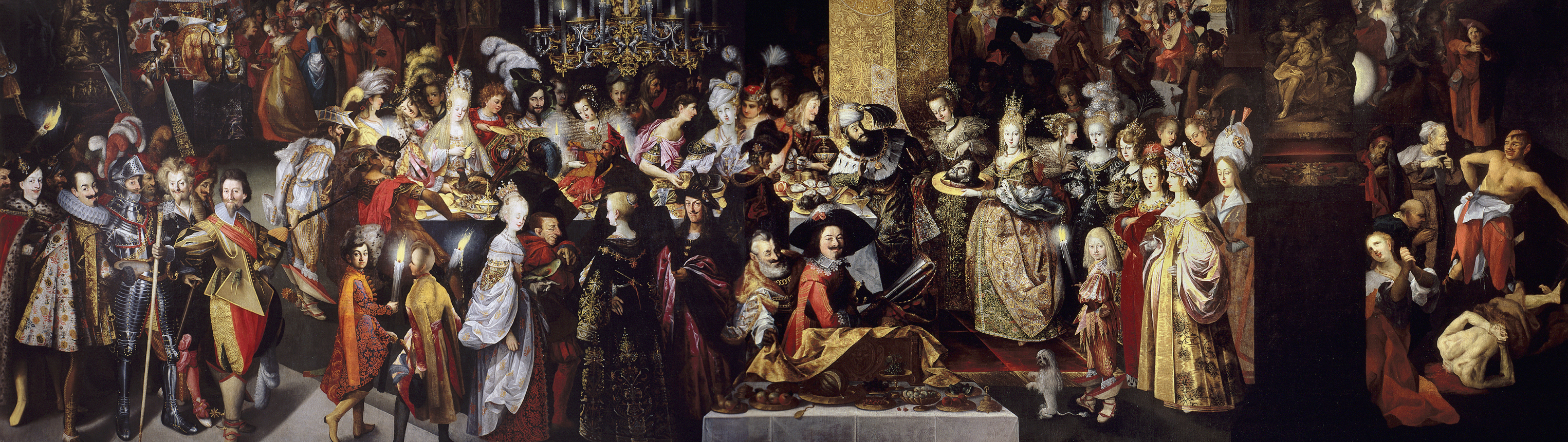
Feast of Herod with the Beheading of St John the Baptist, Prado, almost 10 metres (33 ft) wide, this enormous work is Stobel's masterpiece.

== Allegory of Europe ==
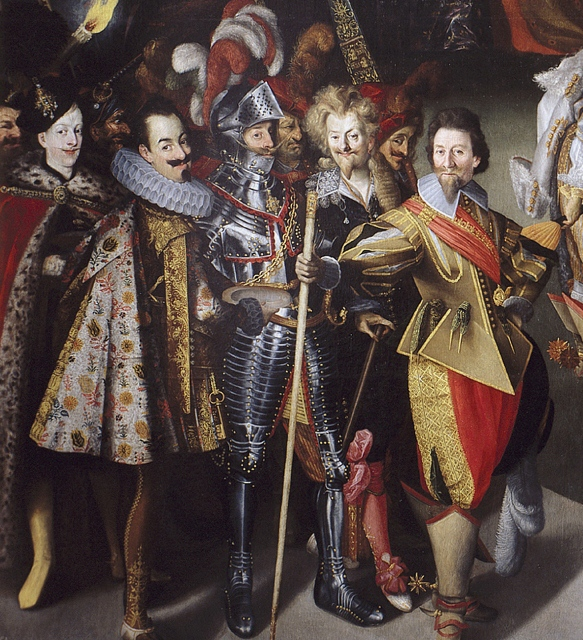
The military group at the left

The painting includes many portraits of leading political and military figures from around Europe, relying on prints for the likenesses of those not known to Strobel. It is probably central to the allegory that the coat of arms of Strobel's home city, now Wrocław, Poland, which he would have known by its German name of Breslau, includes the image of the head of John the Baptist on a platter. Strobel was forced to leave Breslau by the Thirty Years' War in 1634, finally settling in Poland. Only Herod himself, dressed in oriental costume, reacts strongly to the head produced at the dining table; the other figures seem unconcerned, which may be the point of the allegory.

Identifications of the figures shown vary. One set, predicated on a date in the early 1640s for the work, is as follows: the figure holding a trumpet at the centre, looking out at the viewer, is the Dutch Admiral Tromp, whose victory at the Battle of the Downs in 1639 had decisively ended Spanish naval power. To his left Henry IV of France (who had died in 1610) pulls at a cloth over a table laid with fruit (so presenting "the fruits of victory"). The group of men standing in the foreground on the left are the Imperial generalissimo Wallenstein, with the long staff, with behind him his subordinate generals Count Vilém Kinský, Christian Freiherr von Ilow and Count Adam Erdmann Trčka von Lípa as well as one of their assassins in 1634, the Irish colonel of dragoons Walter Butler of Roscrea.

Among the diners at the table are John George I, Elector of Saxony, Charles I of England, the Infanta and from 1637 Empress Maria Anna of Spain (wife of Ferdinand III, Holy Roman Emperor), Marie de' Medici, Dowager Queen of France, her favourite Concino Concini (d. 1617), George Villiers, 1st Duke of Buckingham (favourite of Charles I until assassinated in 1637), and Marie de Rohan, duchesse de Chevreuse.

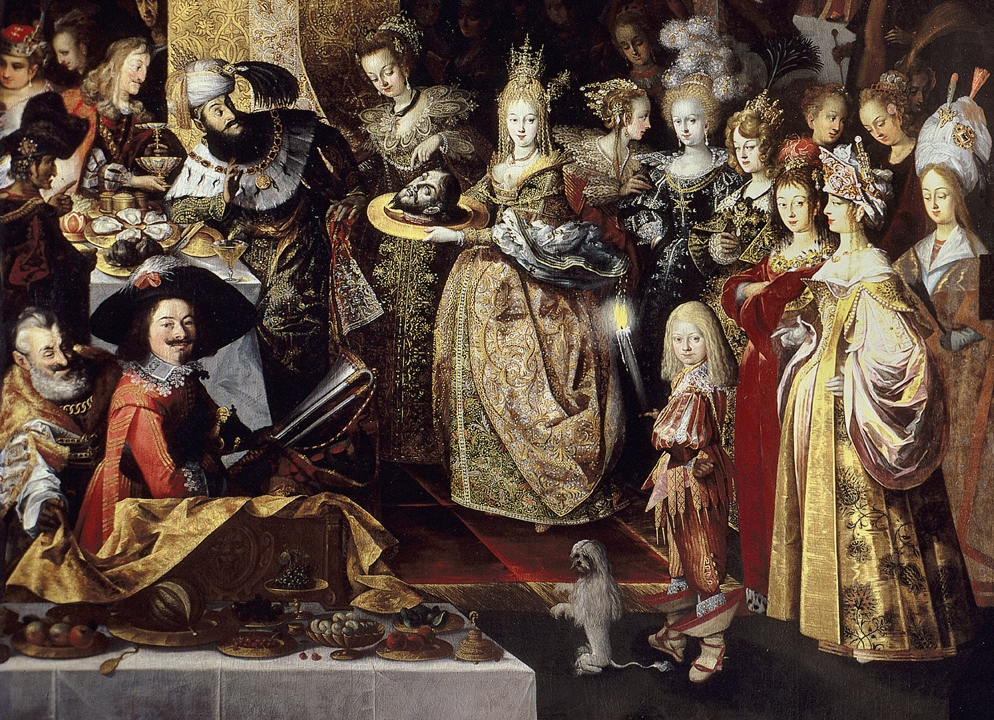
Herod and the group of ladies

The head of John the Baptist on the platter has the features of Duke John Christian of Brieg (d. 1639), the staunch Calvinist champion of Silesian Protestantism. Salome holds the plate, and since her elaborate dress still leaves her implausibly high breasts completely uncovered, she is unlikely to be a portrait of an important figure.

To the right of Herod, the group of ladies includes: Elizabeth Stuart, Queen of Bohemia, Queen Maria Eleonora of Brandenburg, widow of Gustavus Adolphus of Sweden (died 1632), with her daughter Christina, Queen of Sweden (only born in 1626) and sister Catherine of Brandenburg, briefly ruler of Transylvania after her husband Gabriel Bethlen, King of Hungary, died in 1629. The boy with the torch in the foreground may be the exiled Charles I Louis, Elector Palatine (born 1617, son of Elizabeth Stuart), who inherited in 1632, and the somewhat lion-like dog in a sitting-up posture may be an allusion to the lions in the arms of the Electorate of the Palatinate as well as those of the Dutch Republic. The lady in the large turban in the row behind may be Amalia of Solms-Braunfels, wife of Frederick Henry, Prince of Orange, the Dutch stadtholder, who gave the Palatine family refuge in exile.

Alternative identifications find a portrait of Ferdinand II, Holy Roman Emperor, and identify the features of John the Baptist as those of Charles I of England, although he was not beheaded until 1649, which is probably well after Strobel painted the work.

== Style ==
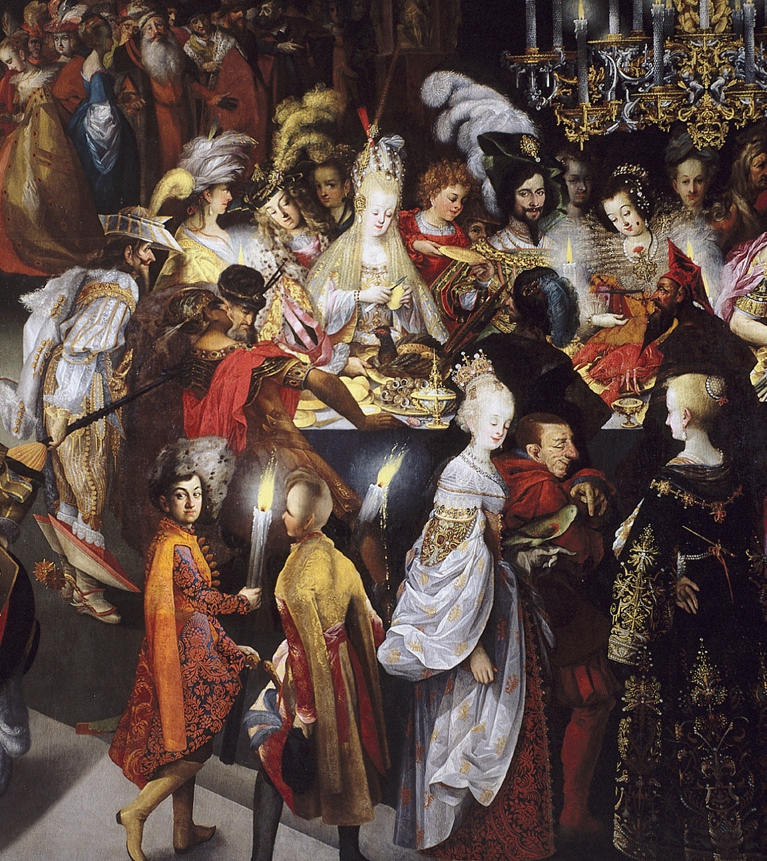
Detail of the left end of the table. The depiction of the standing figures at front varies, and the two boys wear Polish styles of costume.

The style of the figures in the Prado painting varies between realistic portraiture, generalized and idealized faces, especially among the females, and expressive caricature, with the three types often mixed in a single group. The costumes of many figures are painted in great detail and with precision, but the fashions shown vary from French styles of the 1630s to those of Poland, with some purely fanciful elements. The two boys with candles in front of the left end of the table wear Polish styles, from the distinctive szkofia three-plumed hat badge of the right-hand one (held at his waist) to the boots of the one at left, who looks to be a portrait. He also wears a curved Polish or Hungarian type of szabla (sabre). Behind the two boys is a figure of uncertain gender wearing the modified Roman military uniform typically worn by goddesses and allegorical figures in Northern Mannerism; there is a similar figure at the front of the Munich Feast.

This mixture, both as to the depiction of faces and of clothing, is reminiscent of many northern religious paintings of the 15th and 16th centuries, especially those showing the Passion of Jesus. There are reminiscences of the fantastical style of the printmaker Jacques Bellange, another artist whose homeland of Lorraine was to be ravaged by the war. One critic finds the "blurred edges, eclecticism, mixed registers and parodic deflation of late Renaissance literature are mirrored in Mannerist painting, from Jacques Bellange to Bartholomeus Strobel". Despite its late date, Strobel's work remains rooted in the Rudolfine Northern Mannerism of Prague which he had absorbed in his youth.

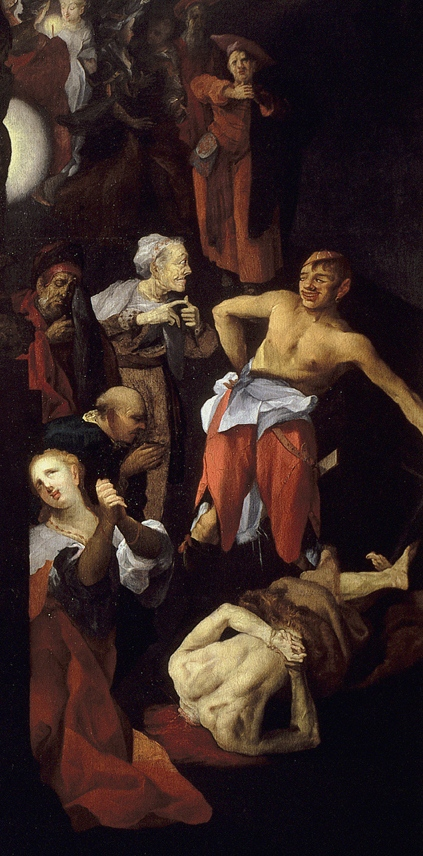
The execution scene

== Provenance ==
The date of the painting and the circumstances of its commission remain unclear. To some extent these questions are tied to the identification of the portrait figures, in particular those of the boys or youths, as their appearances relate to a narrow time period. According to Harosimowicz, the source used for identifying the figures above, the painting "was probably created in Elbing under the patronage of Gerhard and Margaretha von Dönhoff in the period from 1640 to 1642". The Dönhoff family were wealthy German Protestant aristocrats in Silesia, who were also becoming integrated into the Polish nobility. In 1637 Dönhoff married Margaretha, the daughter of Duke John Christian of Brieg, whose features may be depicted on the head of John the Baptist.

Another suggestion for the patron (but with similar dating) is King Władysław IV Vasa of Poland (r. 1632–1649), who had appointed Strobel court artist in 1639. The king's half-brother Karol Ferdynand Vasa, Prince-Bishop of Wrocław (Breslau), whose court painter Strobel had previously been before he left Breslau in about 1633, has also been suggested, with an earlier dating to 1630–33, as used by the Prado (thus preceding Wallenstein's assassination). Only the Prince-Bishop's coat of arms are shown in the painting, and it may have been at his palace at Nysa.

By 1746 the painting was in the Spanish Royal Collection, belonging to Elisabeth Farnese, Queen to Philip V of Spain, and hung in "the room where their Majesties eat" in the Royal Palace of La Granja de San Ildefonso, which Philip had built in the 1720s as a summer palace in the mountains near Madrid. Philip had died that year, and his successor Ferdinand VI had granted the palace and its contents to his stepmother. In the year of her death in 1766 it was still inventoried at La Granja, but in 1794 and 1818 it was recorded at the newer Royal Palace of Aranjuez. Once in the Prado with the rest of the Spanish royal collection it was for long not on public display. In the 2000s, with the remodelling around the construction of a new wing to the rear, gallery space was found for the painting, which now greets visitors who entered by the new wing as they emerge from the lifts on the main floor in the old building.

The painting was long vaguely attributed to an unknown Flemish artist, with suggestions that Joachim von Sandrart, Hendrik Goltzius or Bartholomeus Spranger might be responsible, or an unknown artist from Lorraine or Augsburg. The first attribution to Strobel was made in 1970 by Jaromir Neumann, which was confirmed by Lode Seghers in 1987, on stylistic comparison with a David and Bathsheba signed by Strobel, now in Wallenstein's former castle at Mnichovo Hradiště, Czech Republic. Subsequent comparisons with other documented works by Strobel have confirmed the attribution, which now seems generally accepted.

== Munich version ==
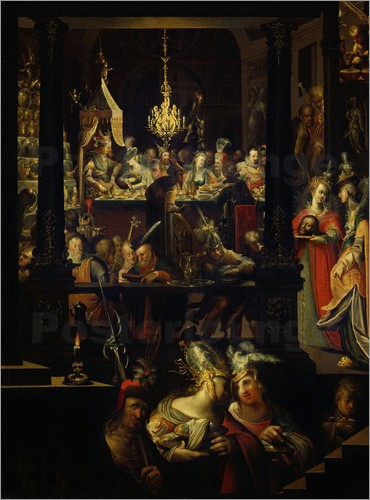
Feast of Herod, now attributed to Strobel. Version at the Alte Pinakothek, Munich

On the basis of the Prado identification another Feast of Herod in the Alte Pinakothek, Munich, far smaller at 95 x 73 cm, was also attributed to Strobel, probably with an earlier date. This "extremely fascinating, involved and mysterious picture" shares many characteristics with the Prado's work, also containing portraits of political and military leaders, mixture of styles, and a complex picture space, with in this case the main feast in the upper background seen through columns. It had previously been attributed to Jacques Bellange among others.

Suggested subjects for portraits in the work include Johann Tserclaes, Count of Tilly, who from 1610 until he died of his wounds in 1632 was the Imperial and Catholic League field marshal before Wallenstein, and commander at the notorious Sack of Magdeburg in 1631. He may be the figure to the left behind the balustrade. The man reading to his right may also be a portrait. The "richly attired man with a pointed beard" at the right hand side of the dining table above may be Gabor Bethlen, the Calvinist Prince of Transylvania and Protestant claimant to be King of Hungary, leader of the Hungarian anti-Habsburg forces in the war. His widow Catherine of Brandenburg may be one of the ladies portrayed in the Prado version.

Stroebel's Daniel and Cyrus before the Idol Bel (1636–1637) in the National Museum, Warsaw is a similar composition, with the figures in eclectic and extravagant costumes, and a feast seen in progress at a lower level in the background. It is still smaller at 39.5 × 30 cm (15.6 × 11.8 in), and in oil on copper.

== Details ==
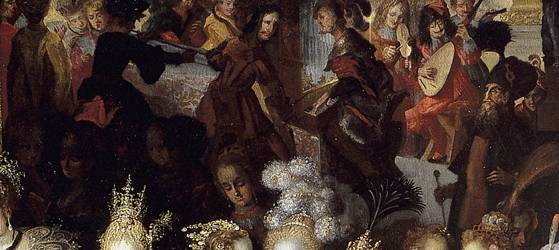
Musicians in the right background

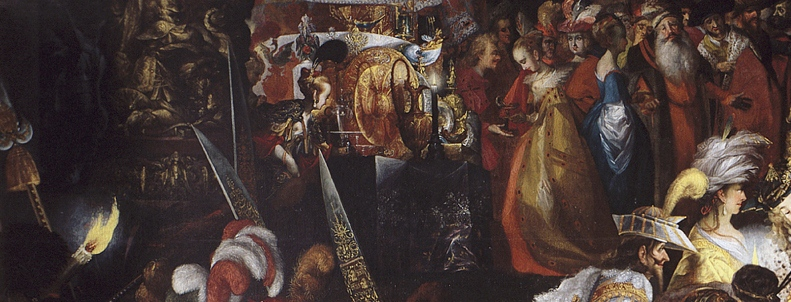
Left background
