= Rombout van Troyen =

17th century Dutch painter

Rombout van Troyen (c 1605, Amsterdam – after 1657), was a Dutch Golden Age painter.

== Biography ==
According to Houbraken he painted Italianate landscapes of ruined palaces and grottos, though he had never been to Italy. According to the RKD his works are confused with those of Jan Pynas. He painted landscapes and architectural scenes.
