= Bartholomeus Strobel =

German painter (1591 – after 1650)

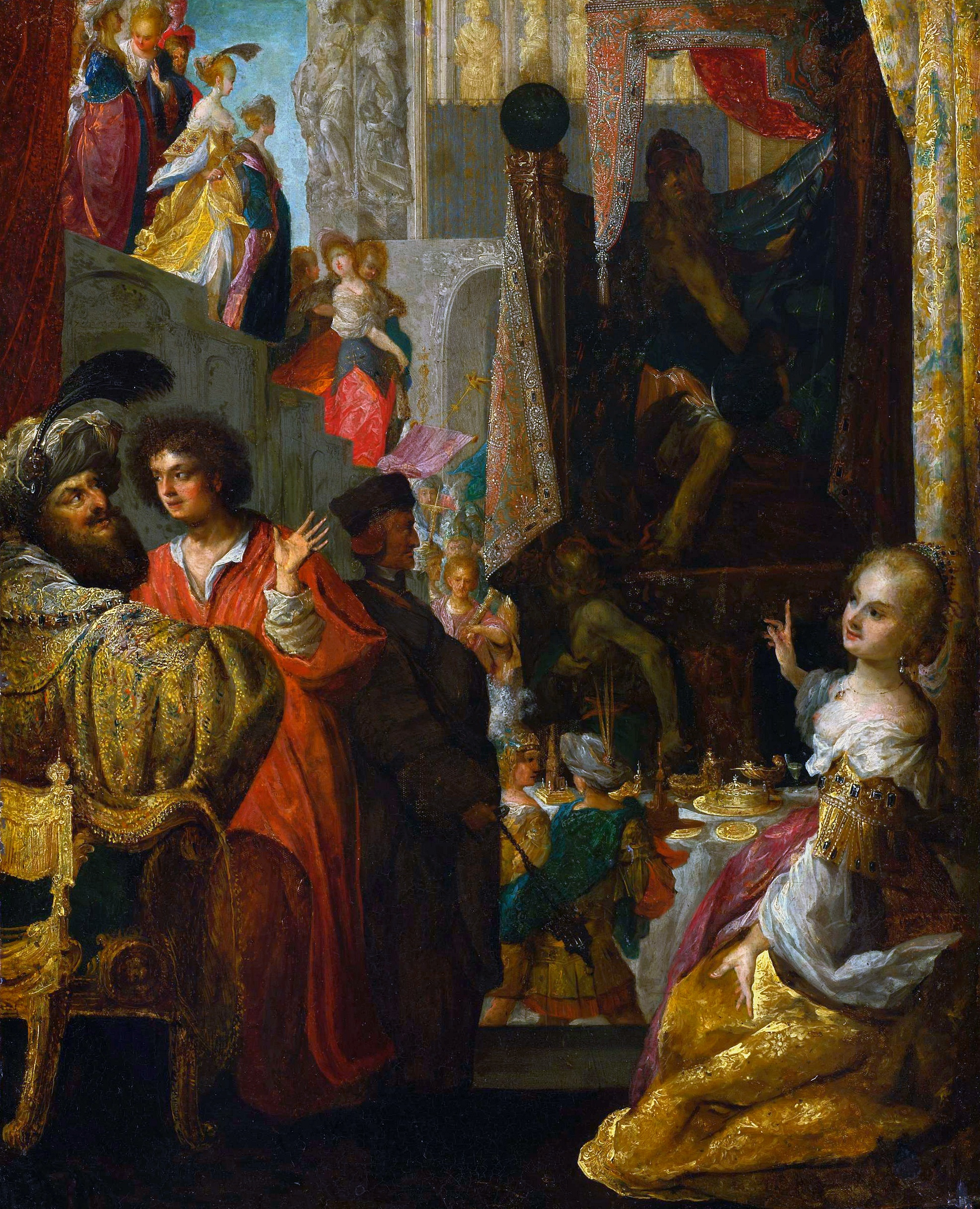
Daniel and Cyrus before the Idol Bel (1636–1637), oil on copper, 39.5 × 30 cm (15.6 × 11.8 in), National Museum in Warsaw

Bartholomeus Strobel the Younger (German: Bartholomäus Strobel; Polish: Bartłomiej Strobel; 11 April 1591 (baptised) – after 1650) was a German-born Polish Baroque painter. Originally from the region of Silesia, Strobel worked in Prague and finally in Poland, where he emigrated to escape the disruption of the Thirty Years War.

He painted portraits and religious works for the complicated ruling elites of the region and religious orders. His largest and most impressive painting, the Feast of Herod with the Beheading of St John the Baptist in the Museo del Prado, combines an ostensible religious subject with a lavish depiction of a contemporary court banquet and many portraits of leading figures in Central Europe, whose identification remains uncertain.

Two much smaller works, a Feast of Herod now in the Alte Pinakothek, Munich, and Daniel and Cyrus before the Idol Bel, currently in the National Museum in Warsaw, repeat the distinctive formula of lavish and rather decadent feasting, placed in a complicated picture space with recessed areas at the back, and with many of the figures wearing fantasy versions of contemporary costume.

== Background and training ==
Strobel was born to a Protestant German family in what is now Wrocław, Poland, which he would have known by its German name of Breslau. Breslau was then part of the Lands of the Bohemian Crown within the Holy Roman Empire, with the Catholic Habsburg monarchy in possession of both, although most of the aristocracy and gentry were Lutheran. Strobel's grandfather had moved to Breslau from Saxony, as some sort of craftsman. In the next generation, Bartholomäus the Elder was a painter, among other artistic and decorative skills, who in 1586 married the daughter of a local painter, Andreas Ruhl the Elder (d. 1567), and ran a workshop where his son Bartholomeus the Younger was trained. Bartholomeus the Younger completed a five-year apprenticeship in 1602, when the workshop had nine apprentices.

By 1610 Strobel was working in Prague, and very possibly visited Vienna, but no documentation for this survives. When Bartholomäus the Elder died in 1612, Bartholomeus the Younger was left 20 thalers and items including a painting by Bartholomeus Spranger, the court painter to Rudolf II, Holy Roman Emperor in Prague, the leading artistic centre in the region. His style in his history paintings remained a late, even rather archaic, continuation of the Northern Mannerism of Spranger and other artists at Rudolf's court, whose last years he participated in.

== Career ==
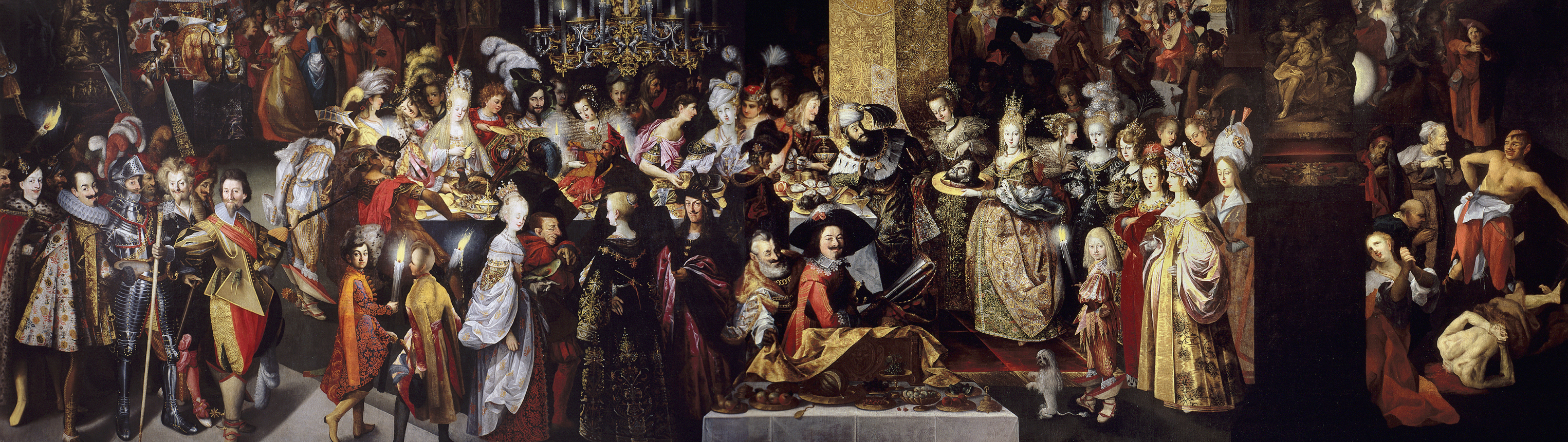
Feast of Herod with the Beheading of St John the Baptist, c. 1630s, Prado; almost 10 metres wide, this enormous work is regarded as his masterpiece

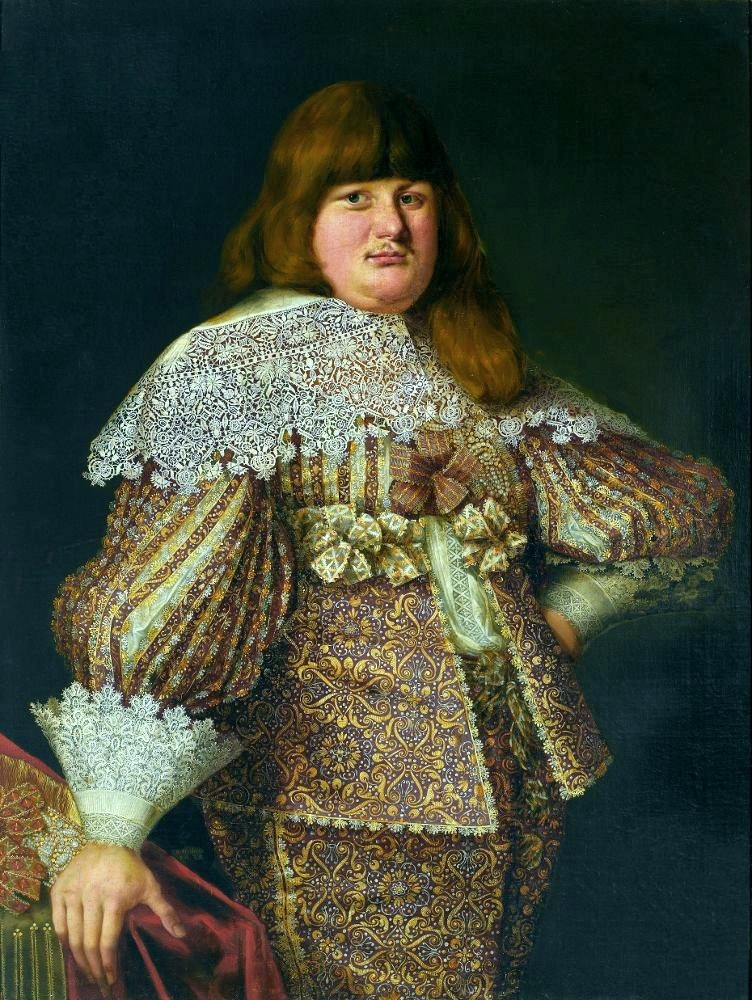
Portrait of Władysław Dominik Zasławski-Ostrogski (1635), Wilanów Palace.

In 1618, when he is documented in Danzig (Gdańsk), he received a "Freibrief" from the Emperor, enabling him to work anywhere in the Holy Roman Empire without the permission of the local guild; the award was repeated in 1624. The early part of his career is only patchily documented, and few works survive, but he was retained as court artist by the Habsburg Archduke Charles of Austria, Bishop of Wroclaw, leader of the Imperial party in Silesia, and from 1625 by his successor Prince Karol Ferdynand Vasa, son of King Sigismund III of Poland. By the mid-1620s he was evidently rather successful, and other patrons included John George I, Elector of Saxony, King Sigismund III Vasa of Poland, and his successor Ferdinand II. He had also painted the previous emperor, Matthias.

The early years of the Thirty Years War brought instability to Silesia, with a string of invasions by the two sides leading to huge destruction and flight of the population. In 1632 Stobel painted the portrait of the invading Prince Ulrik of Denmark (1611–1633), but did not get paid, as Ulrik was murdered the next year. When an outbreak of plague added to the desperate situation in Breslau, Strobel decided to leave Silesia for Poland, and settled in Gdańsk in 1634, receiving many commissions there and in other cities, both for portraits of burghers and aristocrats, and paintings for churches, including the royal chapel of St.Casimir in Vilnius, (1636–37), and in Toruń in 1634. Thereafter he is described as "commuting between Danzig, Thorn and Elbing" (that is to say Gdańsk, Toruń, and Elbląg).

Strobel had met King Władysław IV Vasa of Poland (r. 1632–1649) in 1624, before his accession, and made a drawing for him when he visited Breslau on a European tour. In 1639 he appointed Strobel court painter, and may have commissioned the Prado Feast of Herod with the Beheading of St John the Baptist around this time, though the Prado date it to "1630–33". He had already painted a much smaller version of the subject, now Alte Pinakothek, Munich, which is dated to about 1625, and is in a similarly fantastical style. Indeed, biblical royal feasts were a speciality of his, with several versions of the Feast of Belshazzar attributed to him or his circle. Apart from the two "Feasts" most of his significant works are in museums or churches in Poland.

According to Arnold Houbraken, he received the Dutch painter Gillis Schagen in Elbing in 1637, and was court painter to the emperor at that time.

== Personal life ==
In 1624 he married Magdalena Mitwentz, daughter of a merchant, and the following year was living in a good house in Breslau. He became a friend of the leading German poet of his day, Martin Opitz, after Opitz arrived in Silesia in 1624: Opitz praised his work in verse, and they shared many patrons.

In 1643, after a serious illness, he converted to Roman Catholicism with the Jesuits at Toruń. His death date is uncertain, but his last documented mention has been creeping forward as research proceeds, from 1644 in the 1996 Prado Catalogue, to 1647 in Jagiello, to 1650 in the 2012 Prado Guide, in which year he was 58. He is presumed to have died around then, perhaps in Toruń.
