= The Feast of Herod (Rubens) =

Painting by Peter Paul Rubens

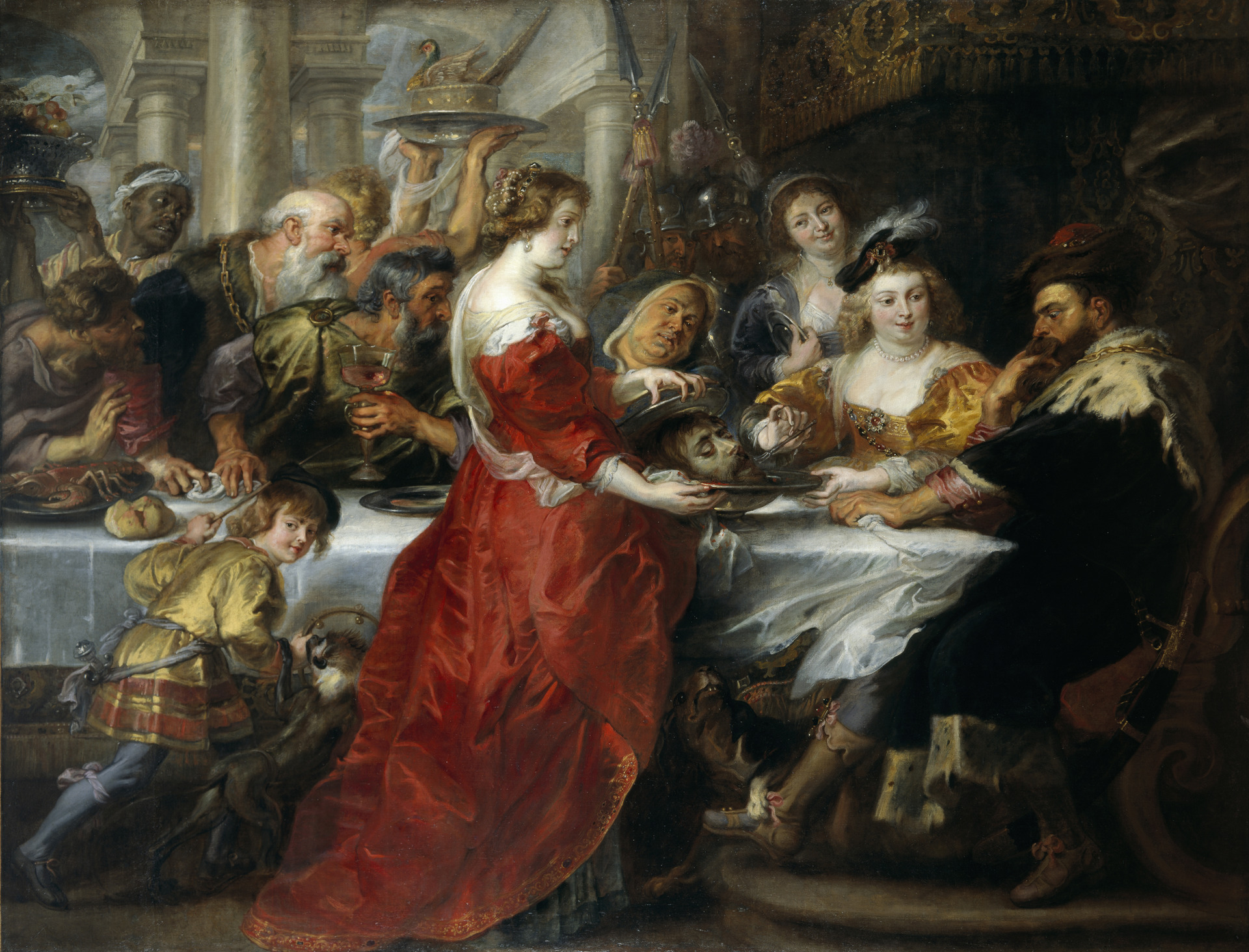
- Artist: Peter Paul Rubens
- Year: c. 1636
- Medium: oil paint, canvas
- Dimensions: 208.00 cm (81.89 in) × 264.00 cm (103.94 in) × 5 cm (2.0 in)
- Location: Scottish National Gallery
- Accession: NG 2193

The Feast of Herod is a c.1635-1638 oil on canvas painting by Peter Paul Rubens, now in the National Galleries of Scotland, for which it was bought in 1958.

It shows a scene from the Gospels in which Herodias' daughter received John the Baptist's head as a reward for her dancing. The work was probably commissioned by patron and collector Gaspar Roomer and possibly helped introduce a neo-Venetian style to Naples which would have a major impact on the evolution of the city's own strand of Baroque painting.

There are several versions of the subject, many copies by followers of Rubens. This painting has been considered a later original and improved version, comprising thirteen figures and reducing the architectural background.
