= Armor of Ferdinand I, Holy Roman Emperor =

Plate armor made for the future Ferdinand I, Holy Roman Emperor

Armor of Emperor Ferdinand I
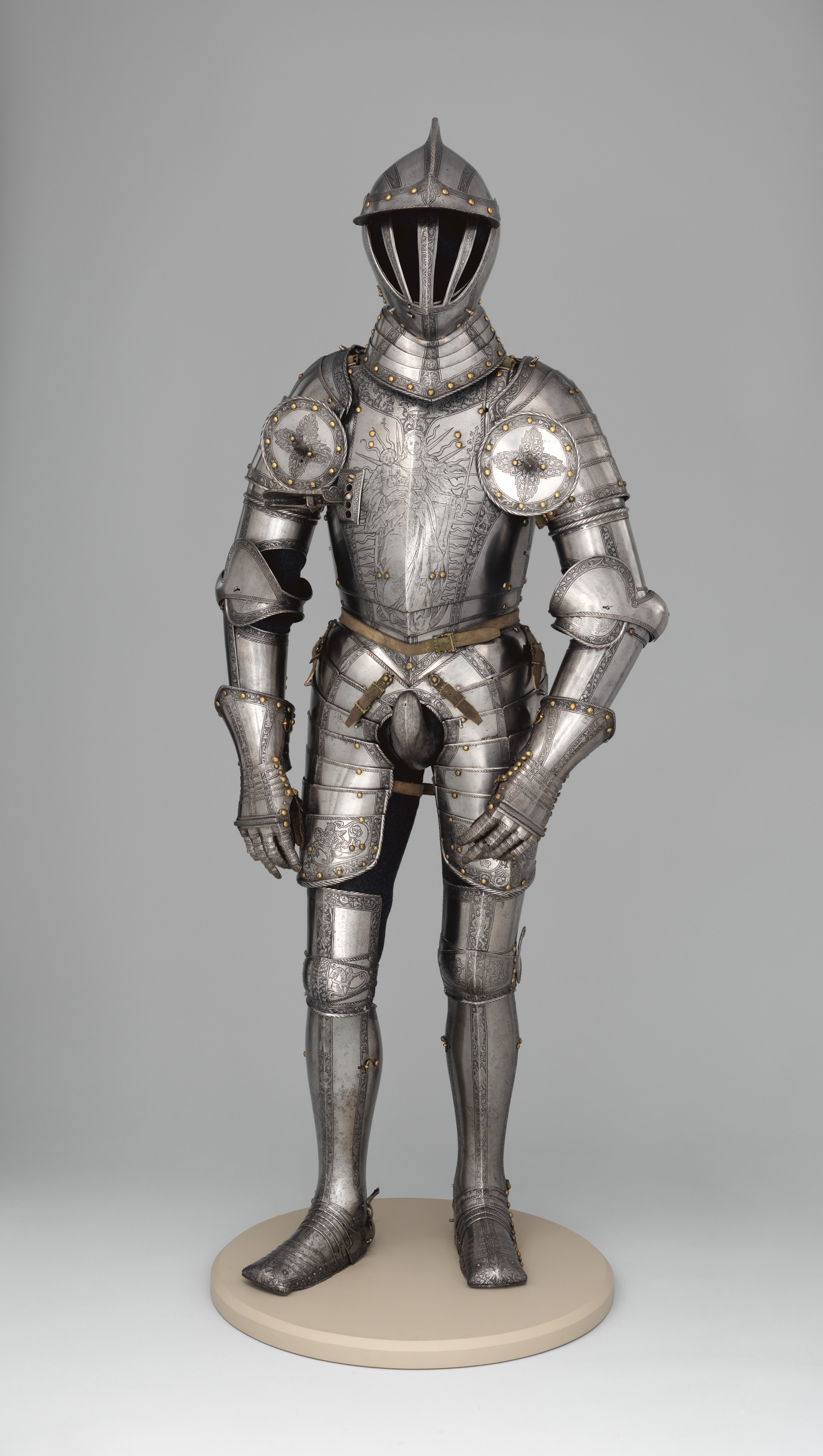
- Artist: Kunz Lochner
- Year: 1549
- Medium: Plate armor: steel, brass, leather
- Dimensions: 170.2 cm (67.0 in)
- Weight: 24 kg
- Location: Metropolitan Museum of Art, New York City
- Owner: Metropolitan Museum of Art
- Accession: 33.164a–x
- Website: Collection - The Met

The Armor of Emperor Ferdinand I is a suit of plate armor created by the Nuremberg armorer Kunz Lochner in 1549 for the future Ferdinand I, Holy Roman Emperor. One of several suits of armor made for the Emperor Ferdinand during the wars of Reformation and conflict with the Ottomans, the etched but functional armor is thought by scholars to symbolize and document the role of the Habsburg Catholic monarchs as warriors on Europe's literal and ideological battlefields.

== Symbolism ==
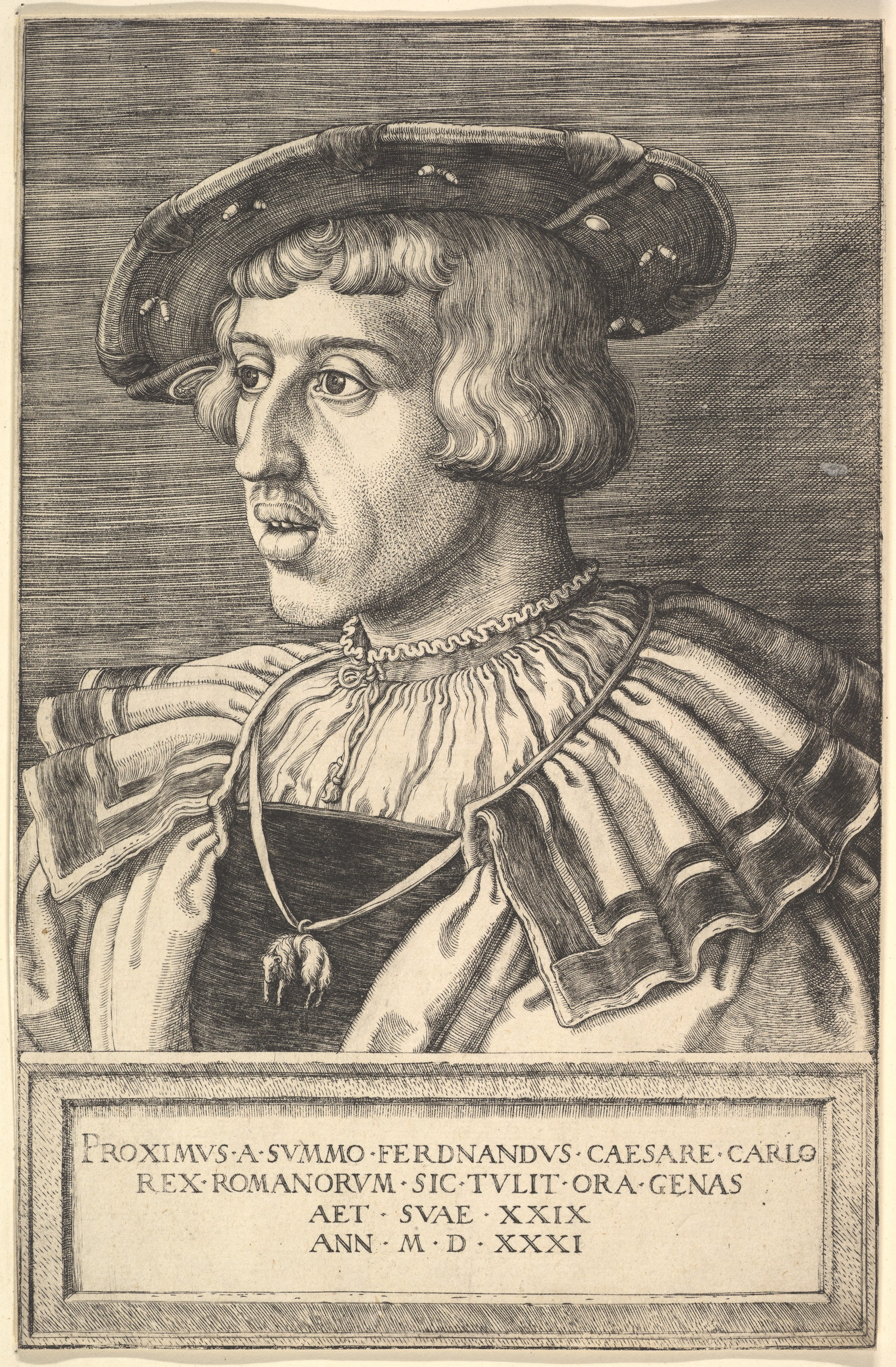
Engraving of Ferdinand I by Barthel Beham.

The armor is dominated by etched symbolism of the Madonna and Child as Woman of the Apocalypse atop a crescent moon on the breastplate, echoing the design on an armor of his brother Charles V at the Royal Armoury of Madrid. On the backplate, a fire-steel (radiating sparks), a Burgundian emblem originated by Philip the Good, sits at a saltire of crossed branches under Saints Peter and Paul in architectural settings.

In function, it is a working piece of field armor (feldküriß or feldharnisch) intended for military use, rather than parade armor, and the etching technique allowed elaboration and complexity in its design, without diminishing the defensive capabilities of the piece.

Ferdinand's then-status as King of the Romans (the heir apparent to his brother Charles V, Holy Roman Emperor) is symbolized by a crowned doubled-headed Reichsadler eagle on the toe caps of the sabatons covering his feet.

The armor is clearly stamped with the "N" mark for Nuremberg and the city's half-eagle coat of arms, and also has the date "1549" included three times in the etched decoration. These and the fantastical figures, arranged in triple bands imitative of a Spanish doublet, the scrollwork filled with tritons and other creatures, suggest Lochner as the armorer.

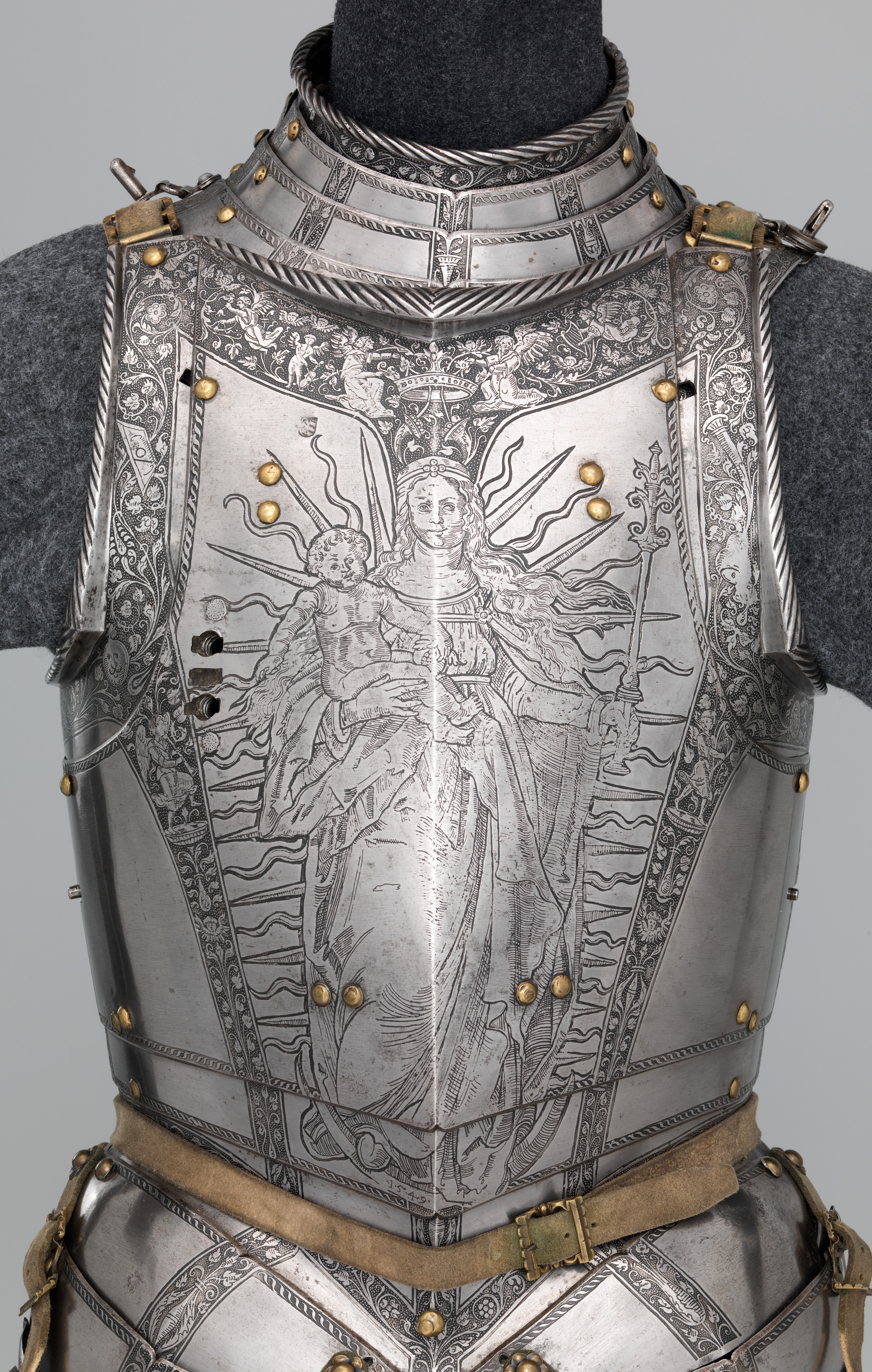
Breastplate

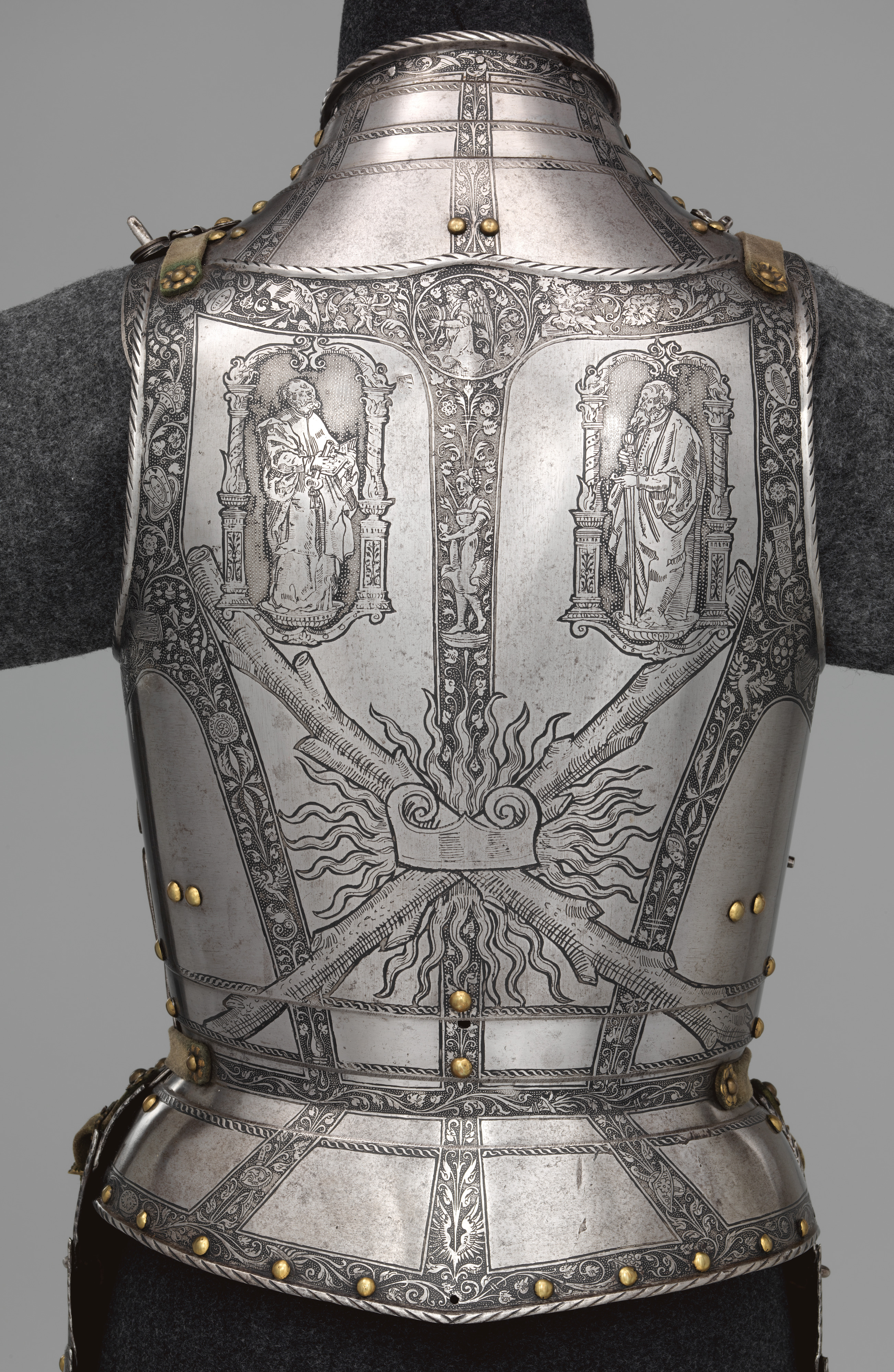
Backplate

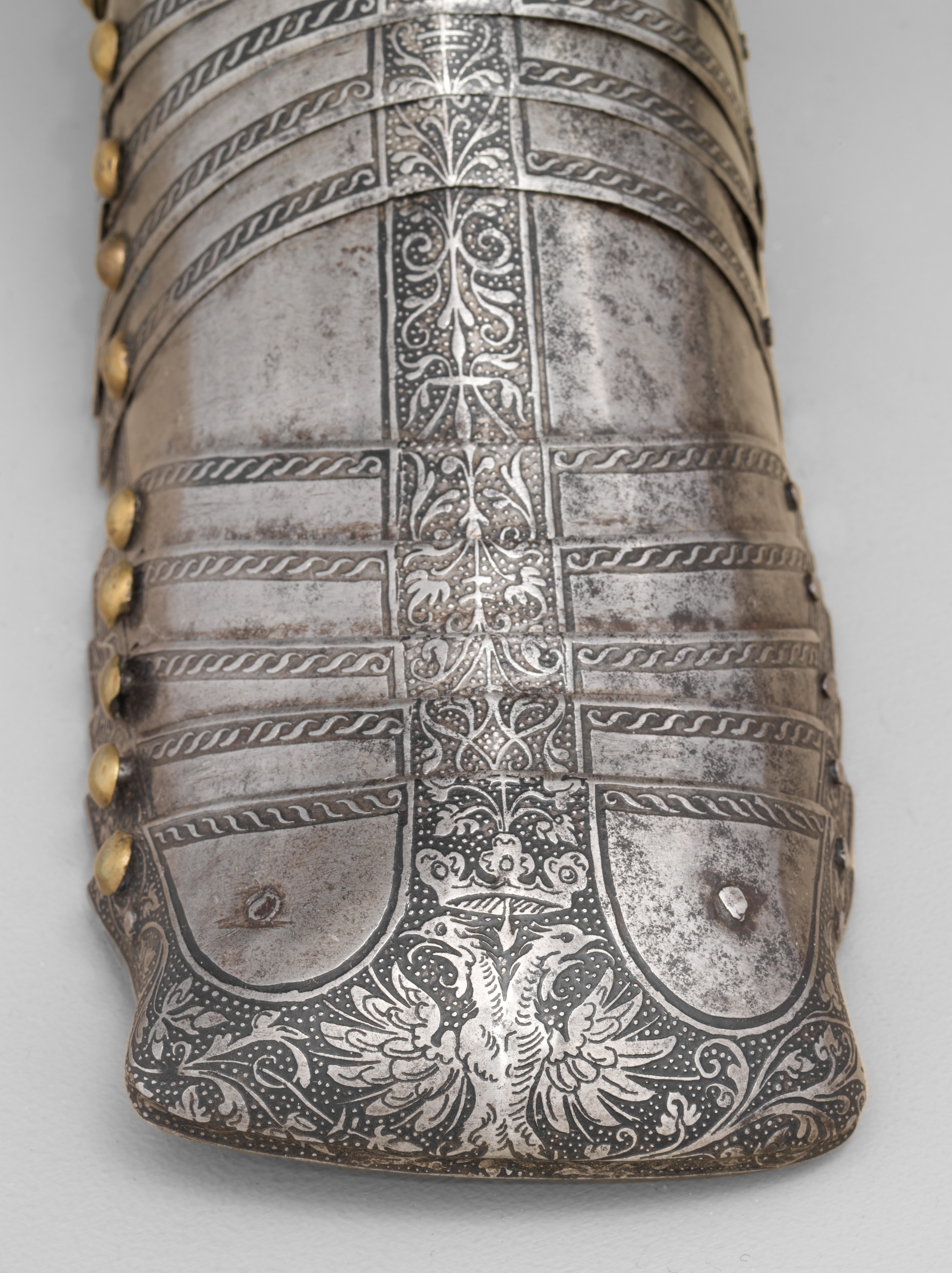
Sabaton

== Provenance ==
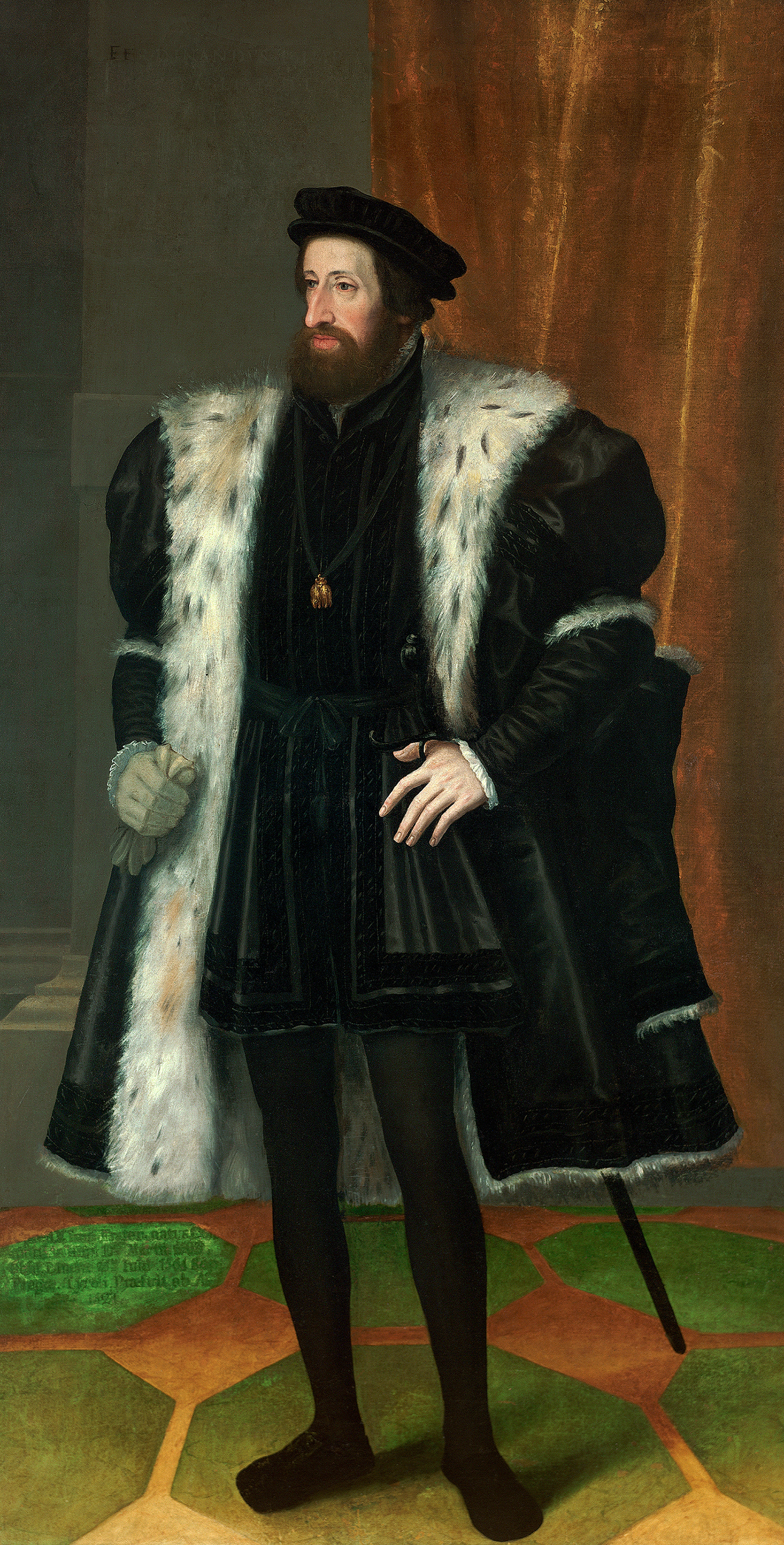
Ferdinand I

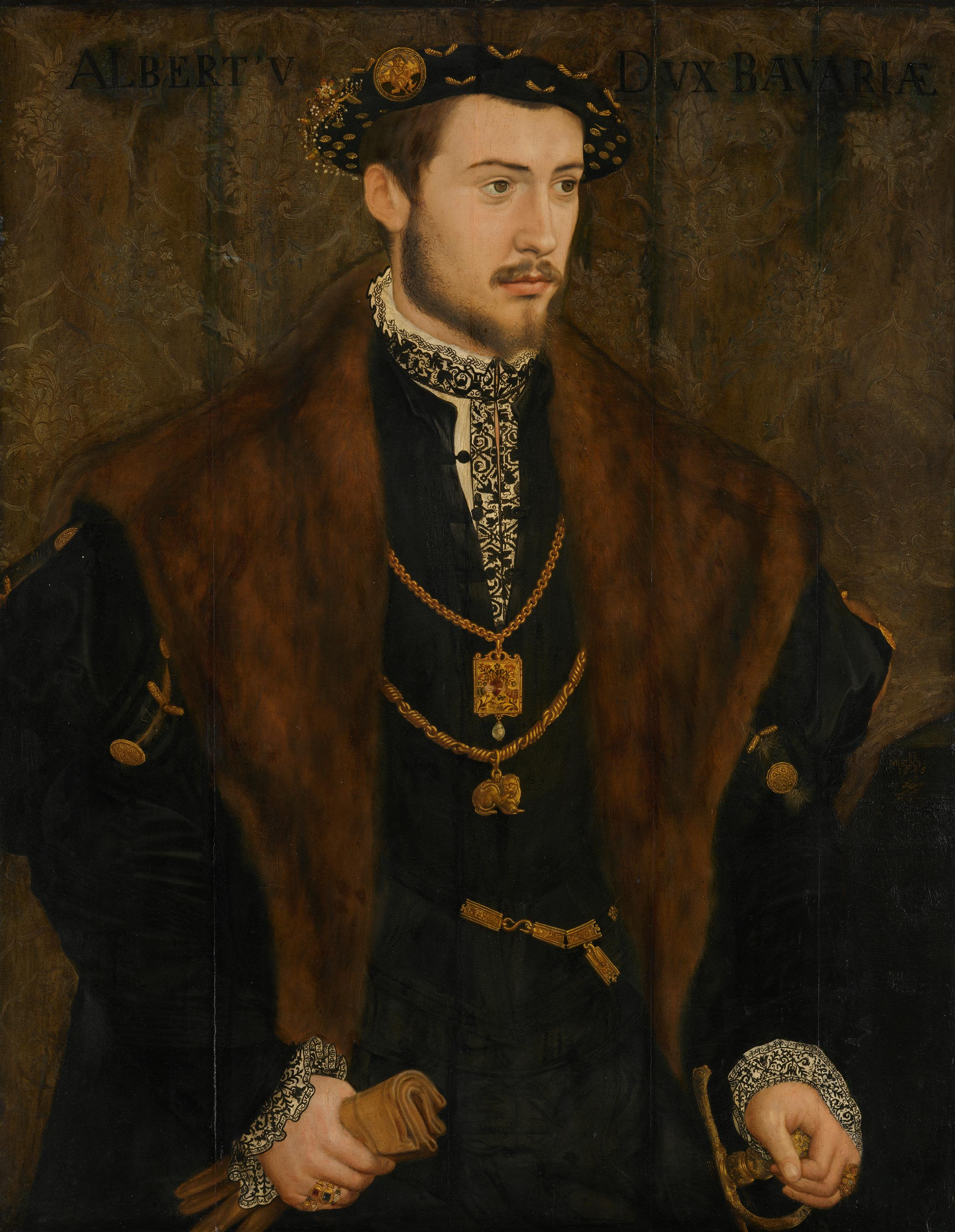
The armor was for many years believed to belong to Ferdinand's son-in-law, Albert V of Bavaria

The armor was acquired by the German collector Franz, Count of Erbach-Erbach in the 19th century (a non-original burgonet helmet was added about this time) and was then thought to be that of Albert V, Duke of Bavaria (the son-in-law of Ferdinand), kept by Franz and his heirs at Erbach Castle, and is currently in the collection of the Metropolitan Museum of Art.

The identification with Ferdinand I was first made by the director of the armory at the Kunsthistorisches Museum, on the basis of the wearer's slight build and relatively short height (no more than 5'7" or 170 cm), straight back, slim waist and long arms, the similarity to his other documented armors, and importantly the Reichsadler eagle on the sabatons. When the identification was initially made with Albert V, it had been assumed it was made for him as a young man, as he gained weight in later life. Albert was also a member of the Order of the Golden Fleece, and the imperial insignia could be seen as representing his marriage to Ferdinand's daughter.

== See also ==
- Ferdinand I, Holy Roman Emperor
- Parade Armour of Henry II of France
- Plate armor
- Propaganda during the Reformation
