= Étienne Delaune =

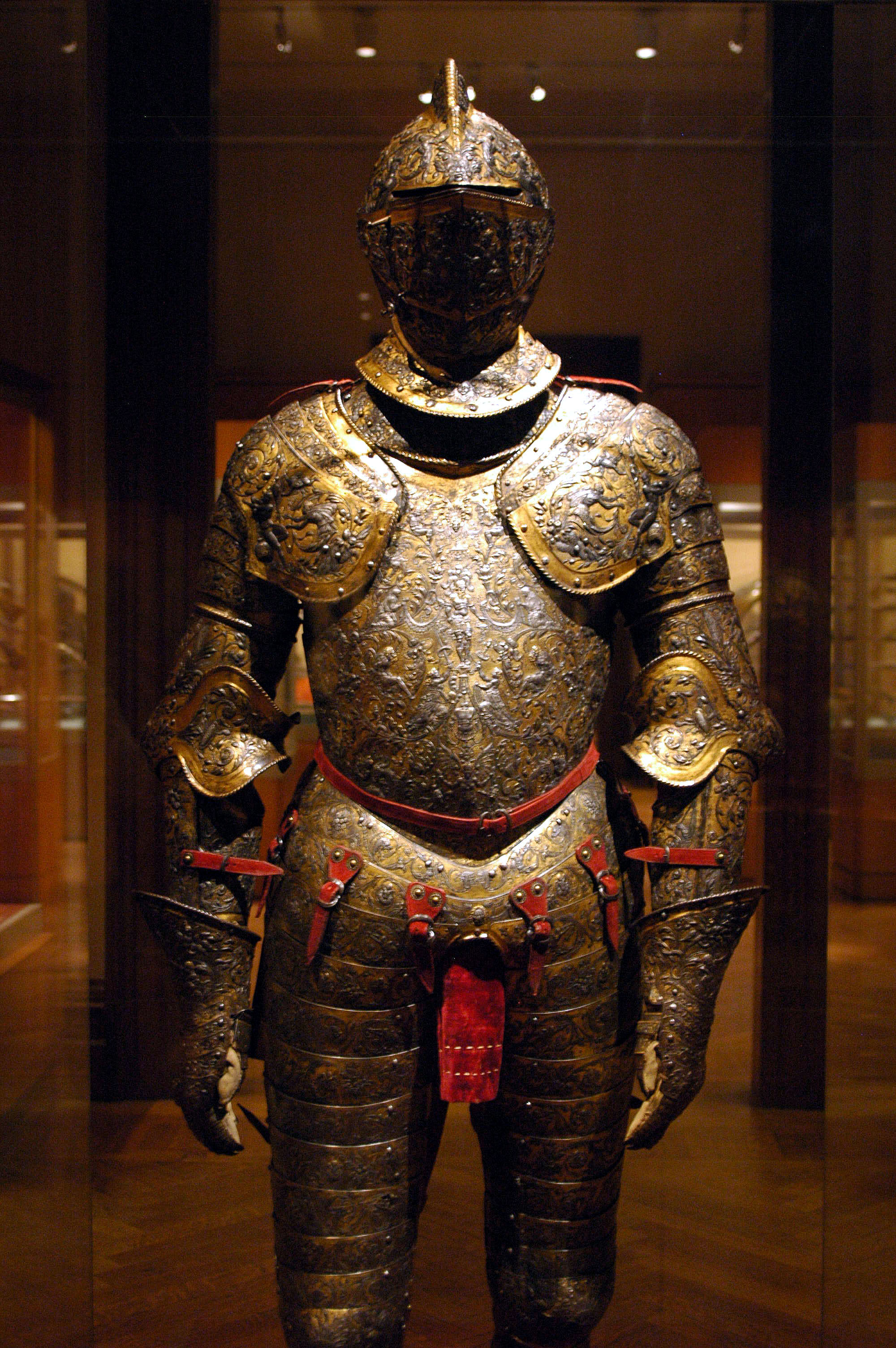
Parade Armour of Henry II of France, c 1555

Étienne Delaune, Delaulne, or De Laune, (1518 or 1519) was a French goldsmith, medallist, draughtsman and engraver .

== Life ==
He was born in Paris, or more probably at Orléans, in 1518. medallist, draughtsman He worked as a goldsmith in Paris in the 1550s. In 1552 he was appointed to the royal mint, where he would have produced metalwork designs. However, he left this position after six months following a dispute about wages. During his employment at the mint, Delaune had been able to build links with the French court and king. This allowed him to obtain royal commissions in particular for the design of intricately detailed royal armour, medals and other metalwork.

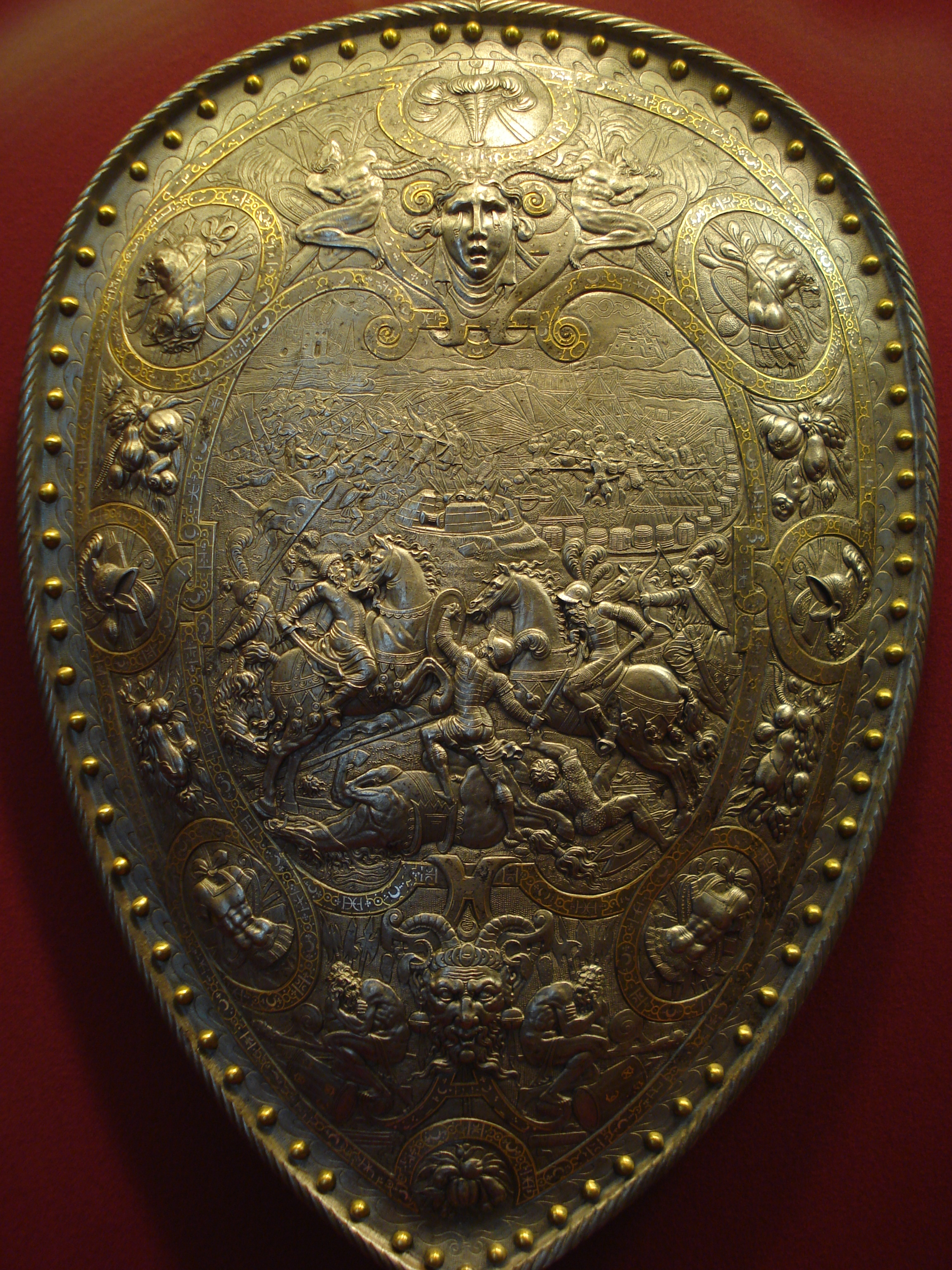
Shield of Henry II of France, depicting Hannibal's victory of the Romans at Cannae in 216 BC

He commenced his career as an engraver of medals, and is said to have been helped by Benvenuto Cellini, who was at that time living in Paris. He afterwards engraved many prints after Raphael, and the Italian masters of Fontainebleau, and still more after the designs of his son Jean, with whom he passed the greater part of his life at Strassburg. His style was formed upon that of the Little Masters of Germany. He died at Strassburg around 1583.

Étienne Delaune was one of the most famous designers of goldsmithery of his time. There are six of his designs in the Louvre; two of them are for circular dishes representing the Histories of Moses and of Samson. His prints, which are generally small, are very numerous; they are executed entirely with the graver, with great dexterity of handling, and are very highly finished. He copied some of the prints of Marc Antonio with success. He usually marked his prints with the initial of his Christian name, S., or S. F., or S. fecit, but sometimes Stephanus, fecit.

== Works ==
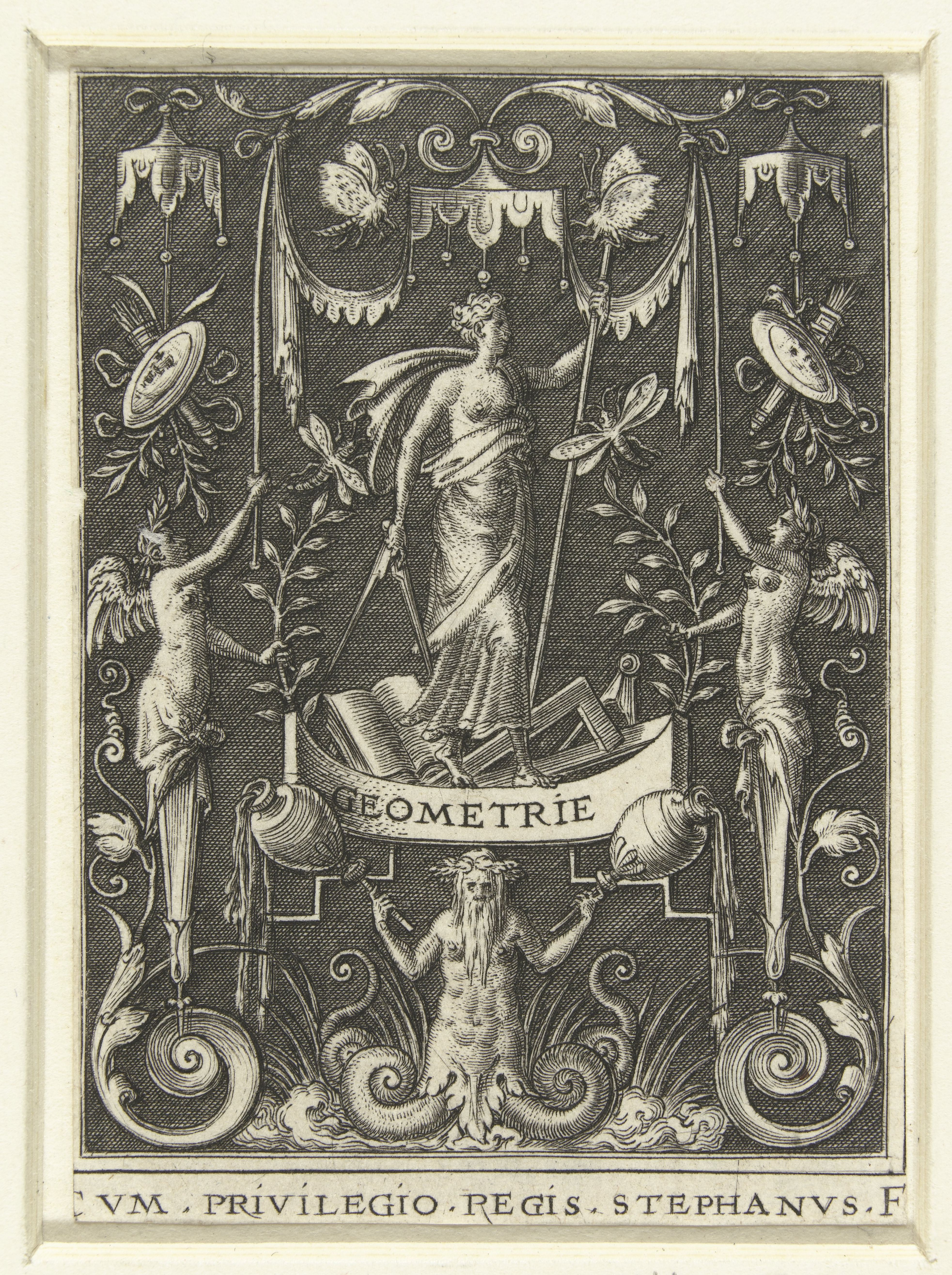
Geometry, engraving

His works are described in Robert-Dumesnil's 'Peintre-Graveur,' vol. ix. The following are the principal:

- A set of thirty Subjects from the Old Testament.
- A set of eighteen Mythological Subjects; oval, very small.
- The Twelve Months of the Year; circular.
- Jupiter, Neptune, Mercury, and Ceres; four circular plates.
- Four Subjects from Ancient History; oval.
- The Four Monarchies; oval.
- Four plates of Rural Occupations; oval.
- The Three Graces.
- David and Goliath; after Marc Antonio.
- The Murder of the Innocents; after the same.
- The Martyrdom of St. Felicitas; after the same.
- The Rape of Helen; after the same.
- The Brazen Serpent; after Jean Cousin. This is one of his largest prints.
