= Parade Armour of Henry II of France =

Ceremonial armor worn by Henry II of France

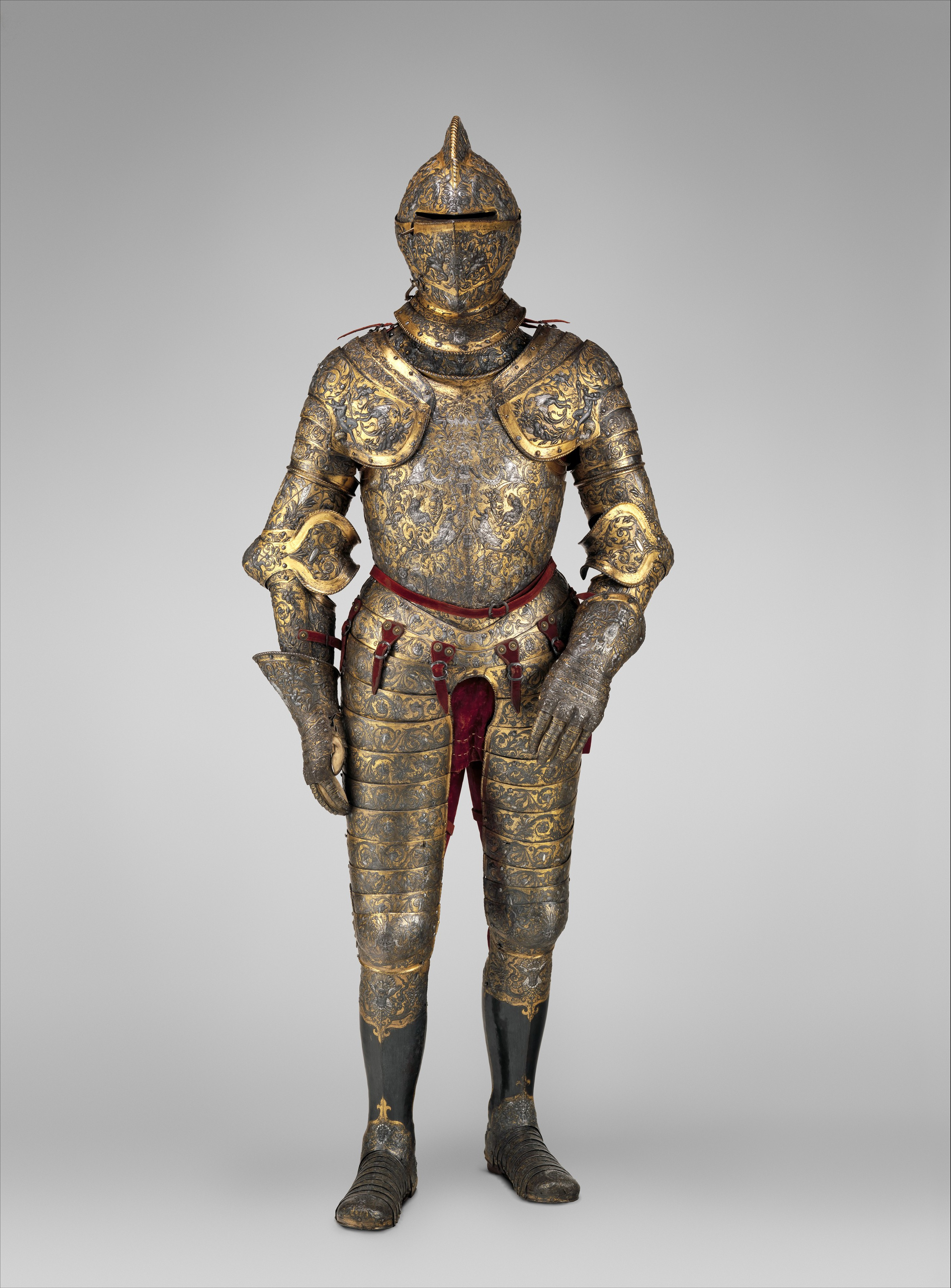
- Artist: Étienne Delaune
- Year: c 1553–55
- Medium: silver and steel and with leather and red velvet
- Dimensions: 188 cm (74 in)
- Location: Metropolitan Museum of Art; New York City

The Parade Armour of Henry II of France, now in the Metropolitan Museum of Art, New York, is believed to date from c 1553–55 and its decoration is attributed to the French goldsmith and engraver Étienne Delaune. Designed for use in pageantry, the armour was fashioned of gold, silver and steel and with leather and red velvet trimmings. It was created for Henry II of France as ceremonial wear; the figures embossed on the breastplate and back are intended to reflect his military achievements.

There are 20 surviving mid-sixteenth-century drawings, thought to be by Delaune, used for sketching the original design. Later additions and modifications are attributed to Baptiste Pellerin and Jean Cousin the Elder. The Metropolitan acquired the armour in 1939 via the Harris Brisbane Dick Fund.

== Description ==
The adornments consist of dense passages of foliate scrolls which are derived from Arabesque art. The imagery contain both human figures and fantastical creatures. The latter seems influenced by the Italian Grotesque, particularly the work of sculptors Francesco Primaticcio and Benvenuto Cellini, both of whom produced works for Henry II.

The human figures include a Roman warrior representing Triumph and Fame. He receives tribute from two kneeling women. The Roman mythology theme appears elsewhere as well: Apollo chases the nymph Daphne across the breastplate and appears on the back with the slain monster Python. This triumphant symbolism is intended to reflect Henry's military achievements. Henry's badge, a crescent moon, appears in several places.

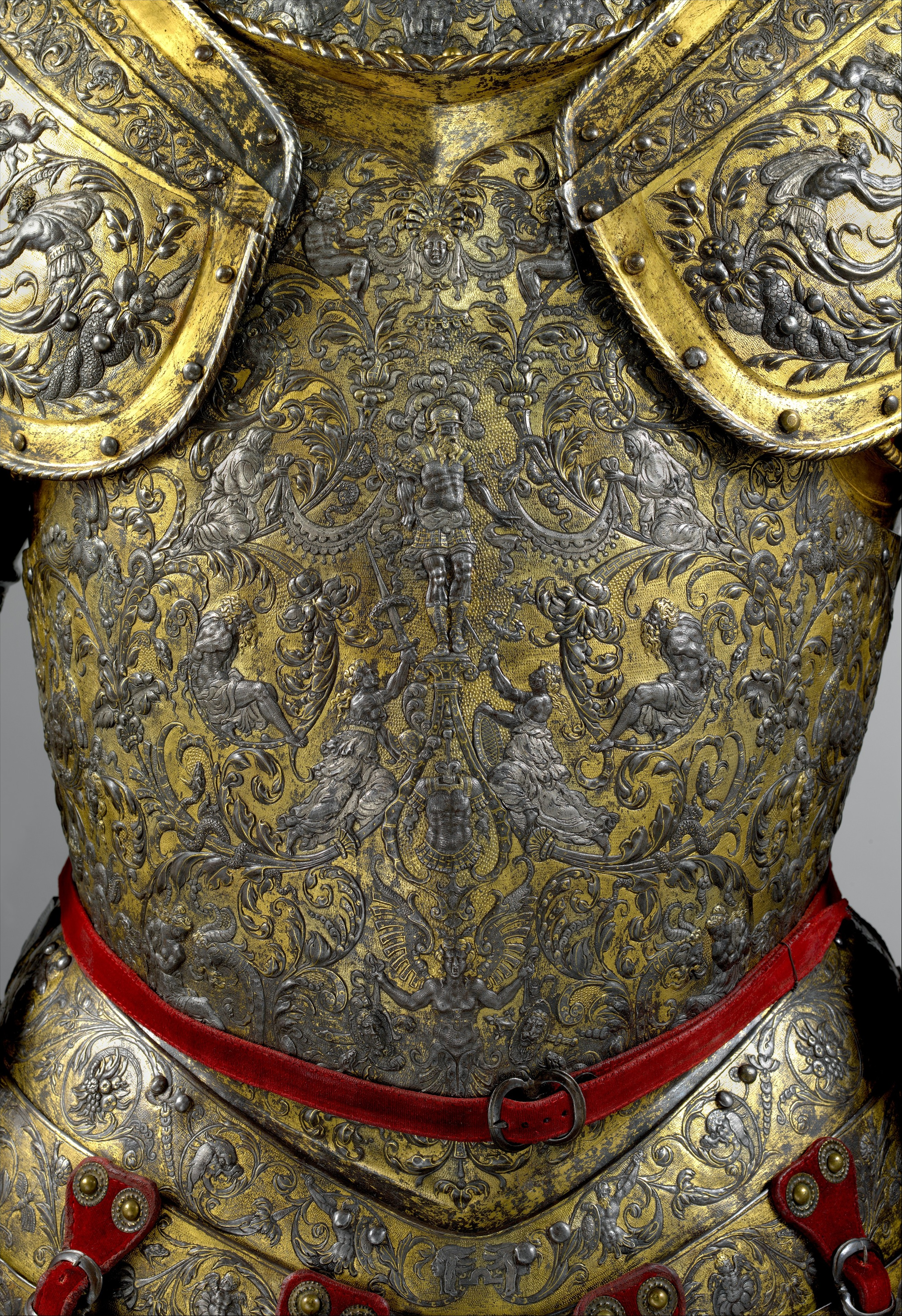

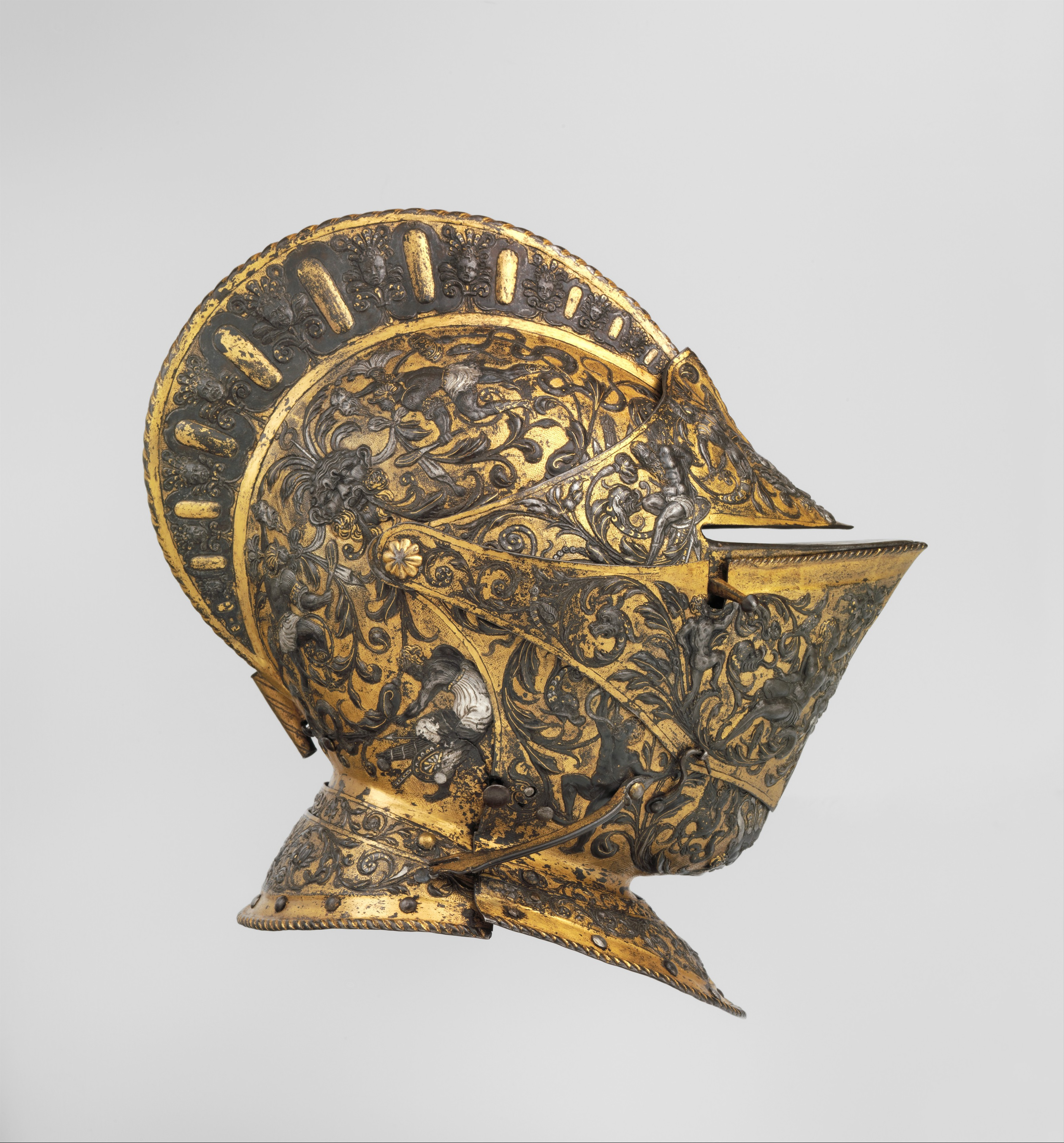

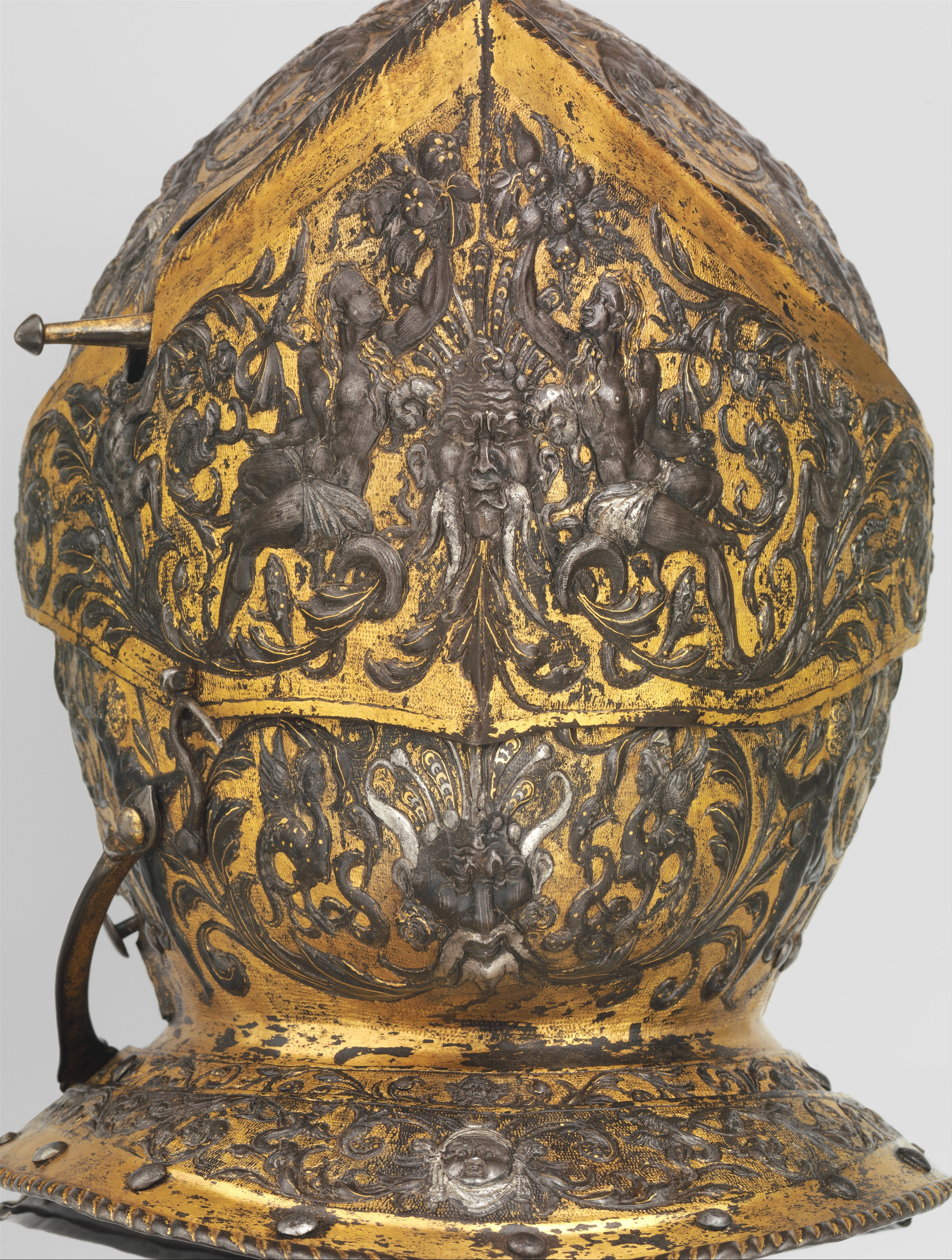

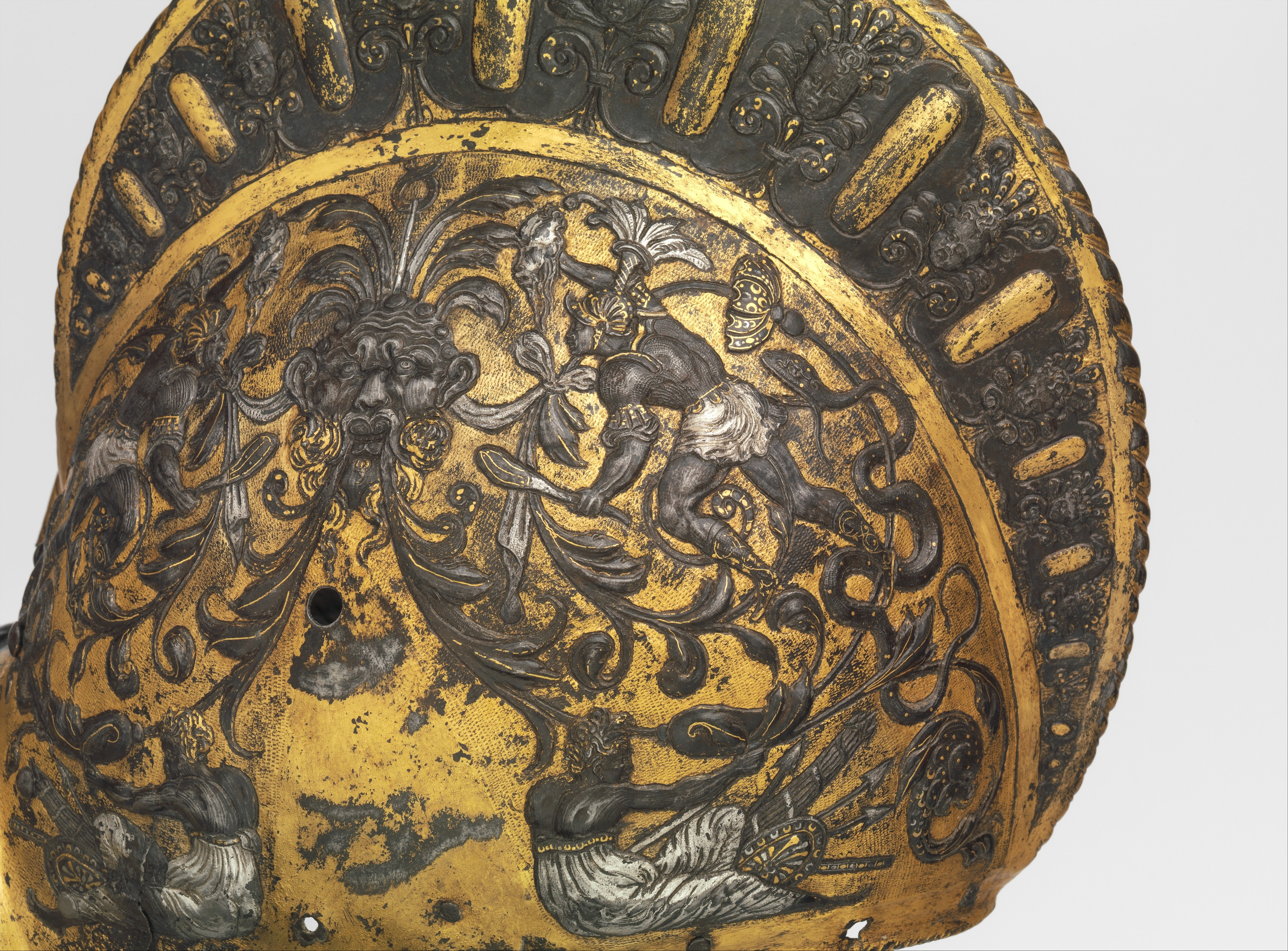

== Function ==
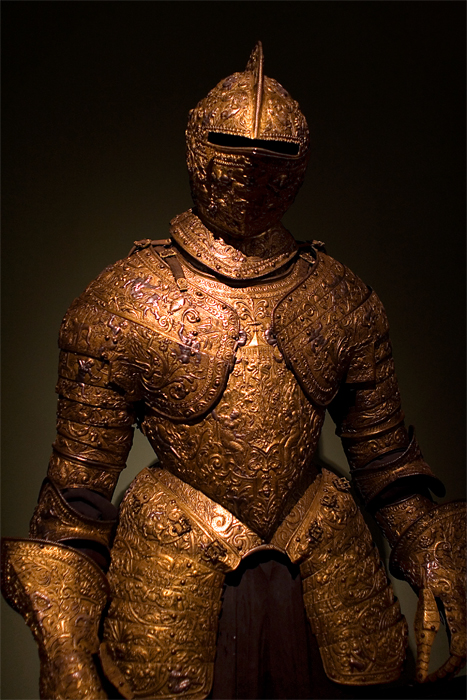
A different suit of armor of Henry II, Museum of Ethnology, Vienna

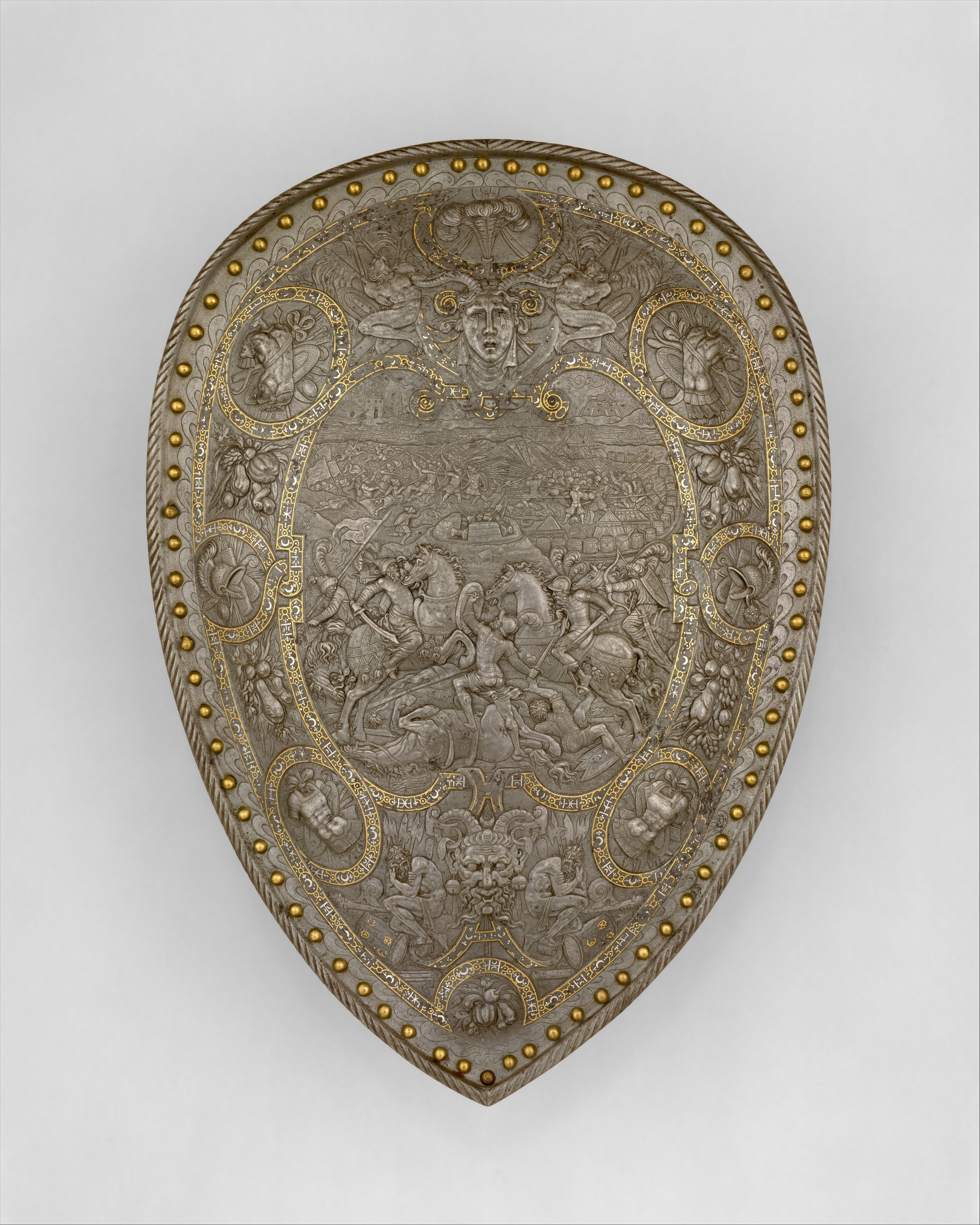
A shield of Henry II, Metropolitan Museum of Art

Parade armour became an elaborate and ornate Renaissance art form intended to both glorify war and flatter the military prowess of the royal subject. Surviving examples include decorated shields, helmets, and full suits of armour. Delaune was an important contributor to the form, and Henry II commissioned a number of similar works, including a panel for his horse, and some bucklers (shields) now in the Louvre, both by Delaune. In addition surviving works for Henry include a full suit at the Museum of Ethnology, Vienna.

Henry required armour for battle, tournament and state occasions, and kept a court armoury staffed by mostly French, Flemish and Italian artisans, of whom Delaune was probably the most skilled and was called upon for the most prestigious commissions. The c 1555 "Shield of Henry II of France" also in the Metropolitan, is thought to have been based on a design by Delaune. Today there are at least six surviving examples of armour designed for Henry by Delaune, a number of which are shields, including in the Wallace Collection, Vienna, and Turin.

The manufacture of the suit would have been highly specialised and complex, probably involving a number of master goldsmiths, and involve high levels of gilding, damascening the layers gold and silver, and leather stamping (embossing). It was probably created at the Louvre Atelier of Royal Armorers, and would not have been intended for wear at battle or jousts – the armour is purely decorative and suitable only for state processions and occasions; its form and design would impede movement and is impractically designed for defense.

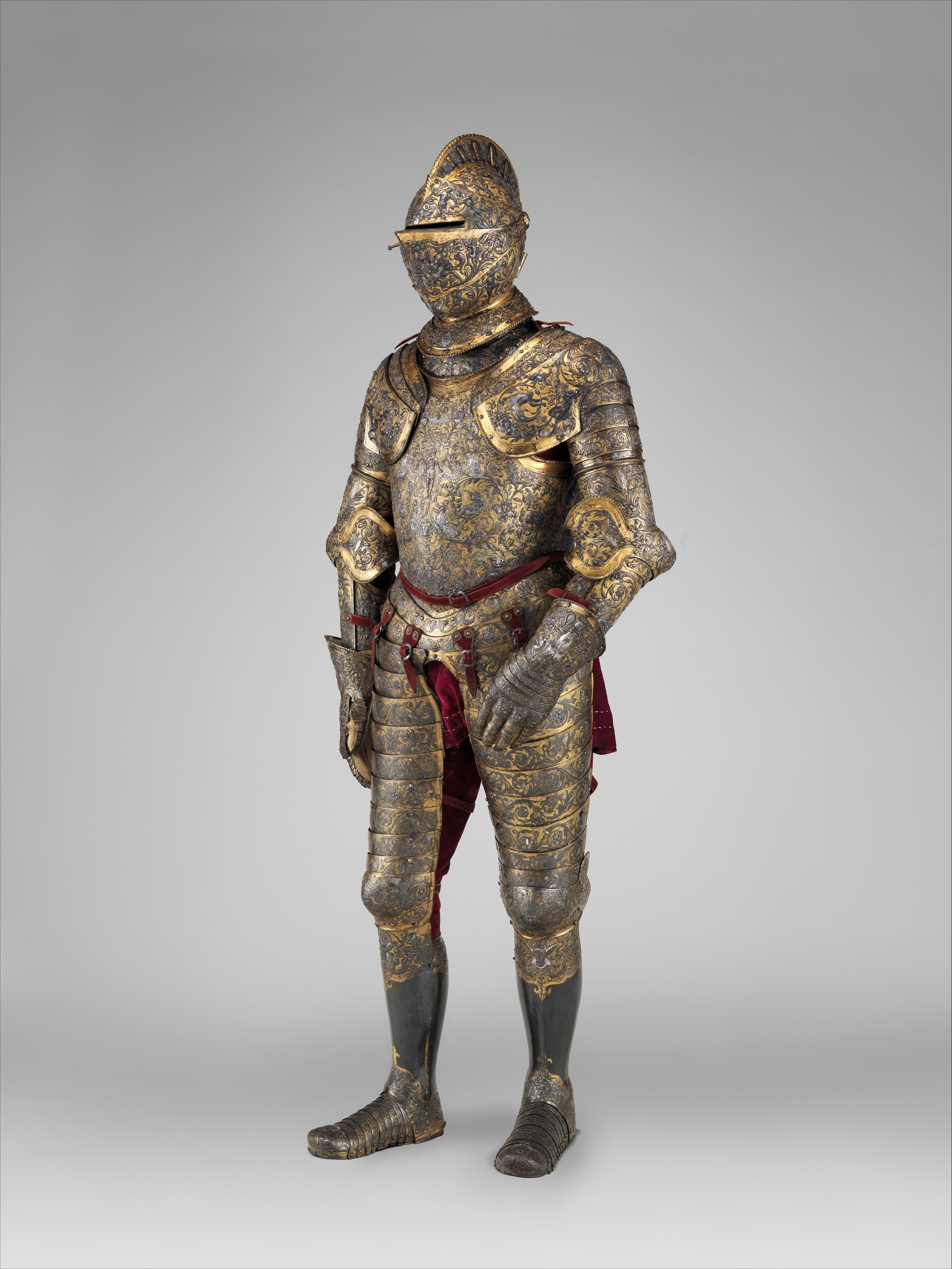

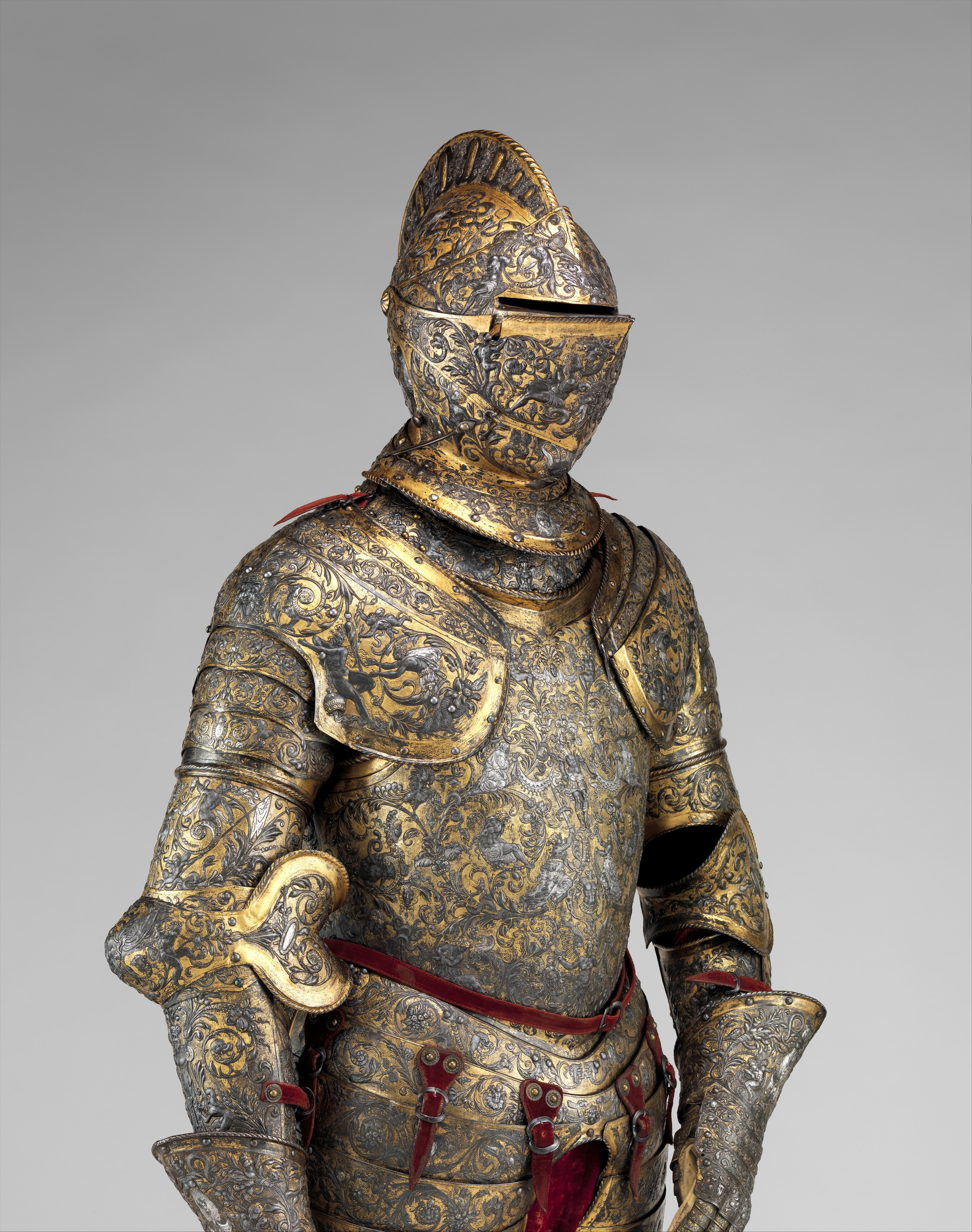

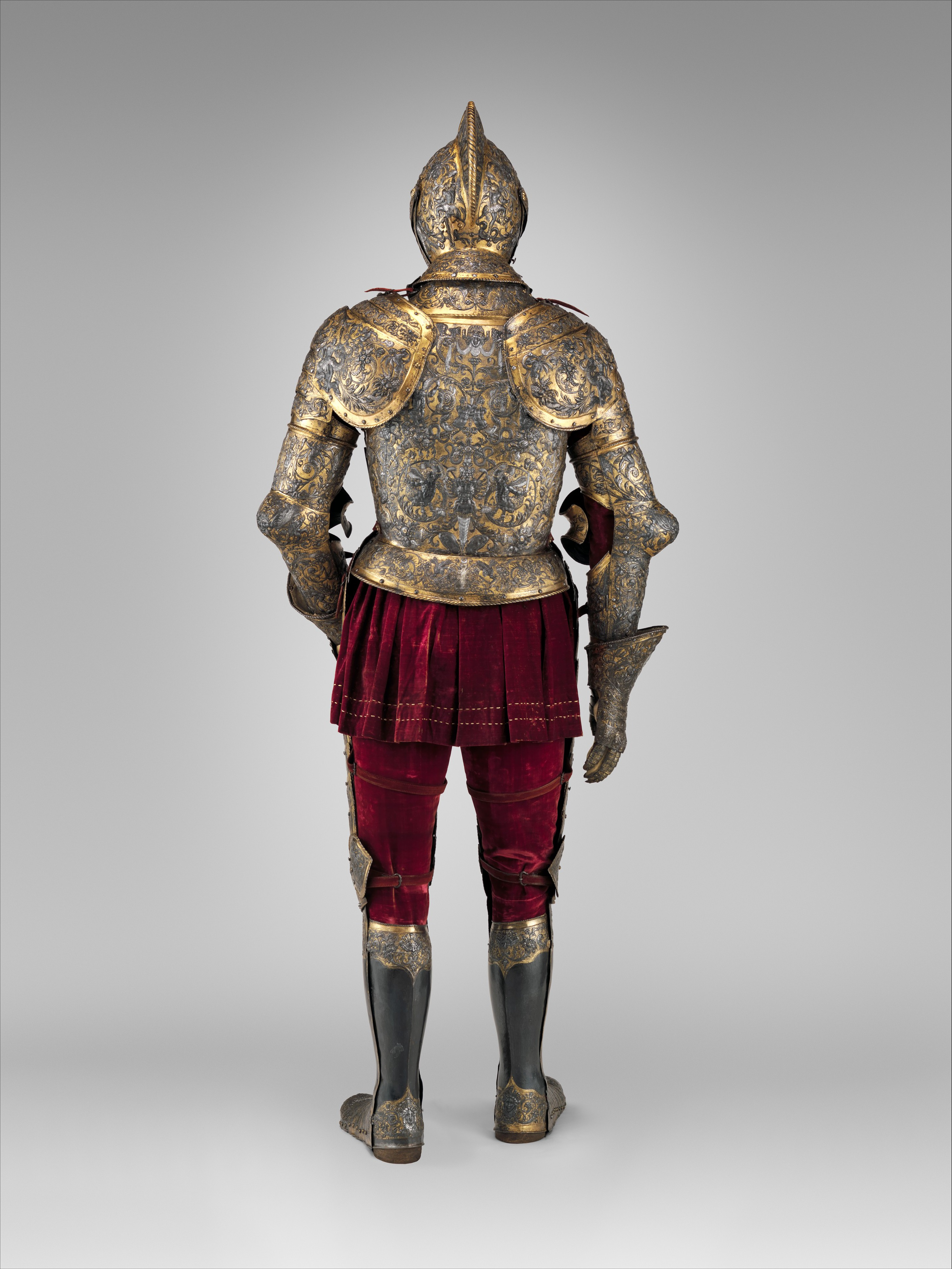

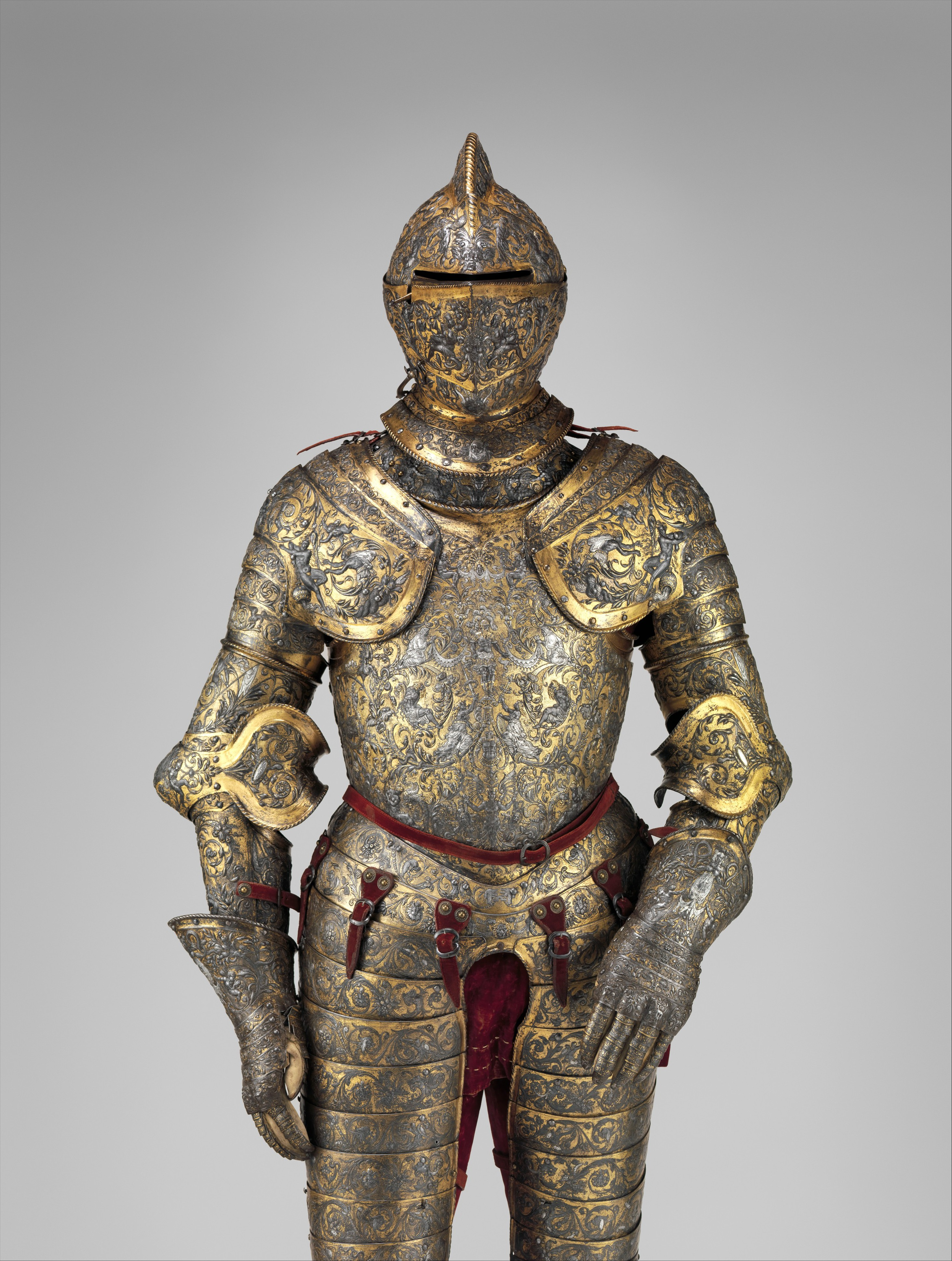

== Sources ==
- Belozerskaya, Marina. Luxury Arts of the Renaissance. CA: J. Paul Getty Museum, 2005. ISBN 978-0-8923-6785-6
- Burn, Barbara. Masterpieces of the Metropolitan Museum of Art. Bulfinch Press, 1997. ISBN 978-0-8709-9849-2
- Montebello, P (ed). The Metropolitan Museum of Art Guide. New York: Metropolitan Museum of Art, 1994. ISBN 978-0-8709-9710-5
- Potter, David. Renaissance France at War: Armies, Culture and Society, C.1480-1560. Boydell Press, 2008. ISBN 978-1-8438-3405-2
- Snyder, James (ed). The Renaissance in the North. New York: Metropolitan Museum of Art Publications, 1987. OCLO 893699130
