= Kunz Lochner =

Armourer from Nuremberg

- Born: 1510; Free Imperial City of Nuremberg, Holy Roman Empire
- Died: August 19, 1567 (aged 56–57); Free Imperial City of Nuremberg, Holy Roman Empire
- Occupations: Armourer, Blacksmith, Etcher, Silversmith
- Known for: Master plate armourer of the 16th century

Kunz (Konrad; also Conrad or Conrath) Lochner (1510 – 19 August 1567) was a master plate armourer, blacksmith, armour etcher, and silversmith active in the Free Imperial City of Nuremberg in the Holy Roman Empire (in present‑day Germany).

Lochner was the son of a skillful armourer with the same name (d. 1527), and his two brothers Heinrich and Hans who were also skillful armourers and blacksmiths. In 1543, Lochner entered the service of Holy Roman Emperor Ferdinand I at the royal armoury of Prague Castle, and the following year he began serving the future Maximilian II as court armourer. Around 1550, his work for the Austrian Habsburgs came to an end. In 1552, he supplied the Electorate of Saxony, and from 1557, he was in contact with King Sigismund II Augustus of Poland. In 1559, he travelled to the Polish royal court to collect outstanding payments. Shortly after 1560, he produced a horse armour for Carlos, Prince of Asturias. Lochner's workshop produced some of the most magnificent plate armours made during the 16th-century Renaissance period for field warfare, tourney, and ceremonial occasions. Lochner's patrons included royalty, knights, and nobility from across Europe.

Armour crafted by Lochner—whether bearing his personal hallmark (a shield with a demi-lion in dexter and bendy of six in sinister, or a shield with lion rampant), often marked together with the Nuremberg Beschau hallmark (the city's official assay and quality‑control stamp), or attributed to him on stylistic grounds—is preserved in museums such as the Royal Armoury (Livrustkammaren) in Stockholm, the Dresden State Art Collections (Dresden Armoury) in Dresden, the Army Museum in Paris, and the Metropolitan Museum of Art in New York City.

== Known preserved works ==
=== Parade armour for man and horse ===
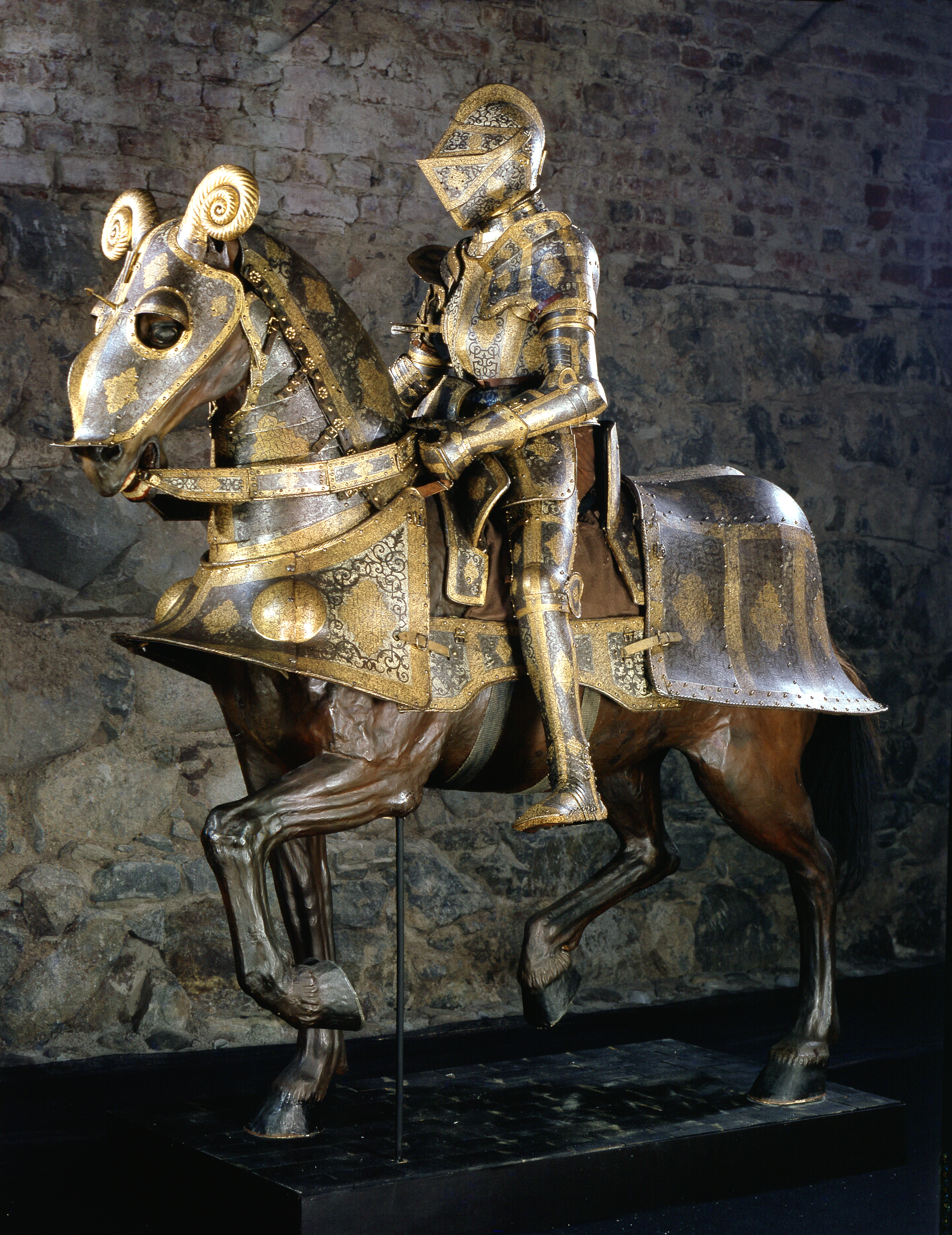
Armour of King Sigismund II Augustus of Poland, preserved at the Swedish Royal Armoury, Stockholm

The armour was crafted in 1550 for King Sigismund II Augustus of Poland, the last ruler of the Jagiellonian dynasty. In his wills he divided his personal possessions among his sisters, including Catherine Jagiellon, Queen of Sweden and wife of John III. As Poland had no designated heir, John III sought to advance the claim of their son, Sigismund, in the forthcoming royal election. During the negotiations surrounding the Polish succession, Catherine's sister Anna sent the armour to John III as a diplomatic gesture intended to reassure him regarding the inheritance and to secure Swedish support. The surviving components comprise elements of a full plate armour and bard.

== Gallery of preserved works ==
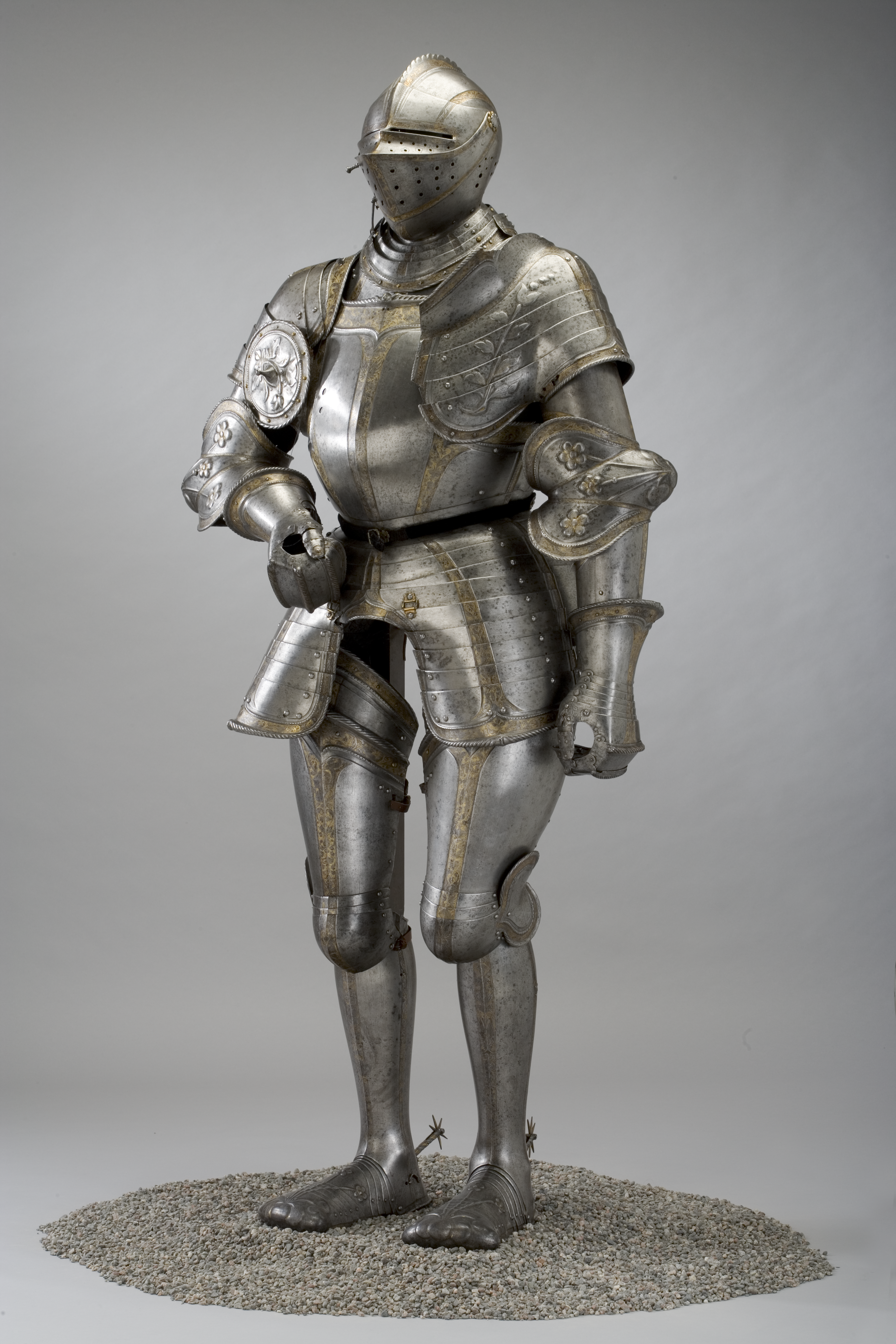
Armour of Gustav I of Sweden, dated back to 1540, preserved at the Swedish Royal Armoury, Stockholm

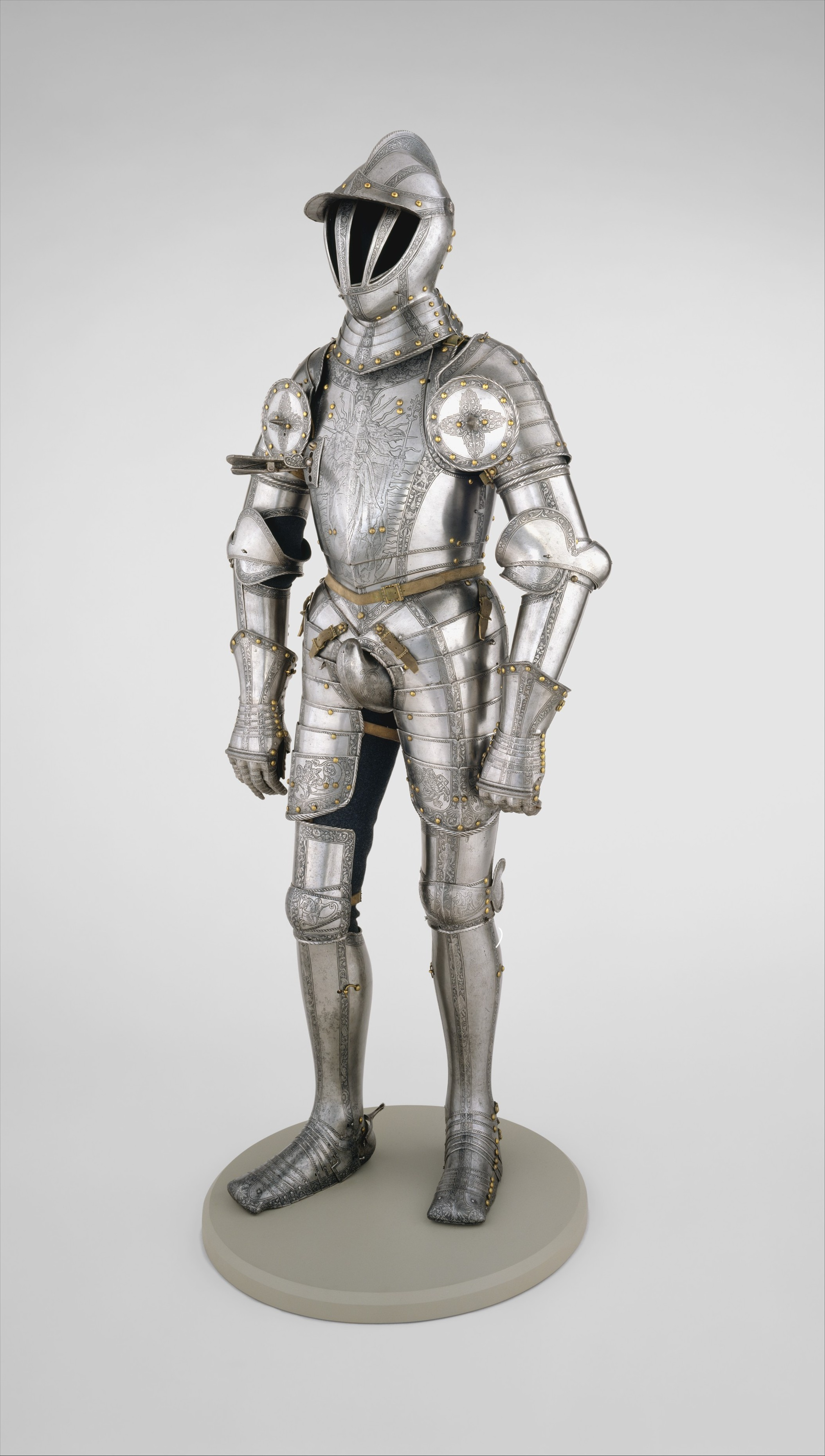
Armor of Ferdinand I, Holy Roman Emperor, created for then-Archduke Ferdinand in 1549, preserved at the Metropolitan Museum of Art, New York

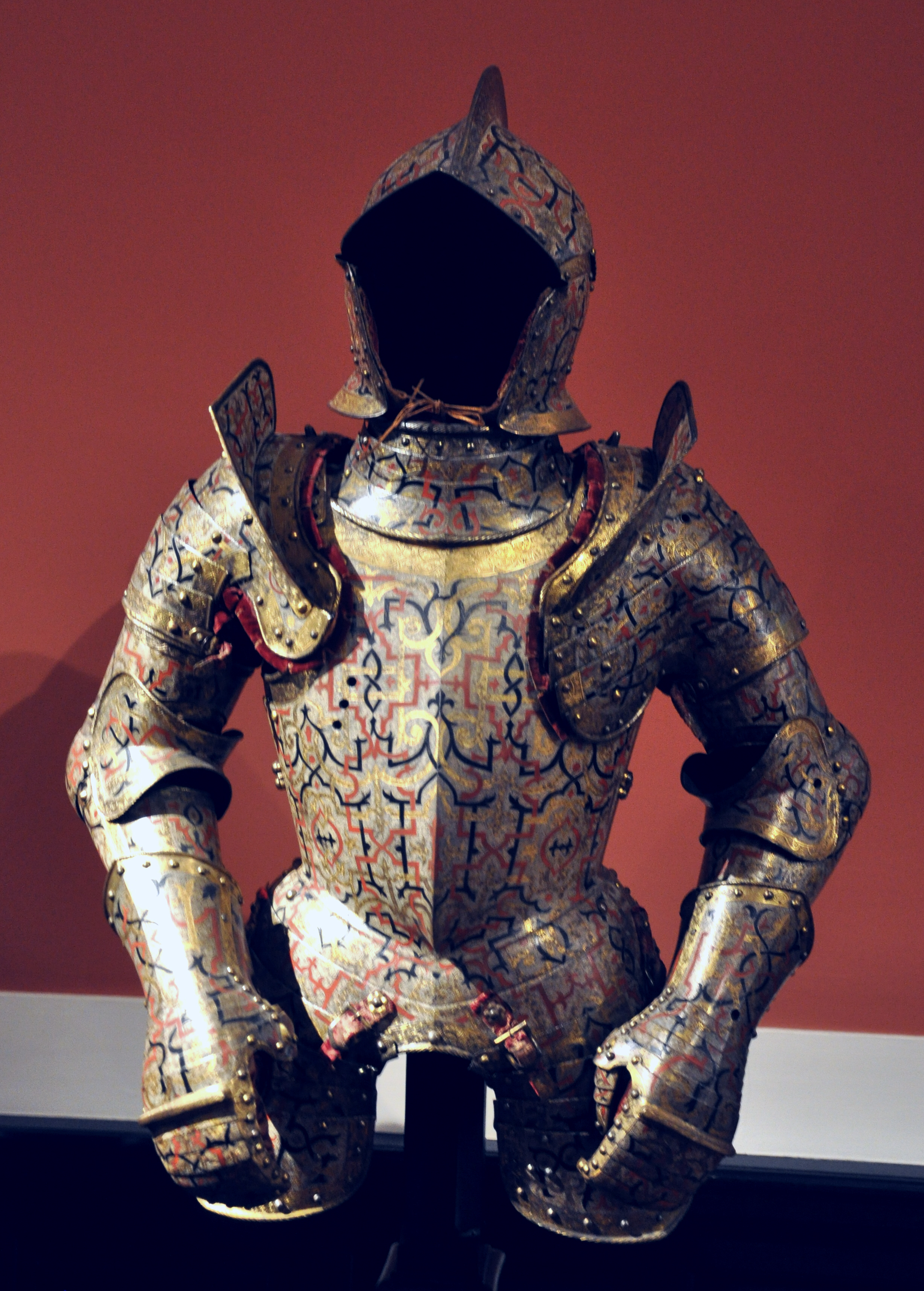
Half‑armour from a garniture of Mikołaj Radziwiłł the Black, circa 1555, Grand Marshal of Lithuania (1515–1565), preserved at the Imperial Armoury (Hofjagd- und Rüstkammer), Vienna, Austria

== See also ==
- Armor of Ferdinand I, Holy Roman Emperor
