= King of the Romans =

Title used by medieval and early modern German monarchs

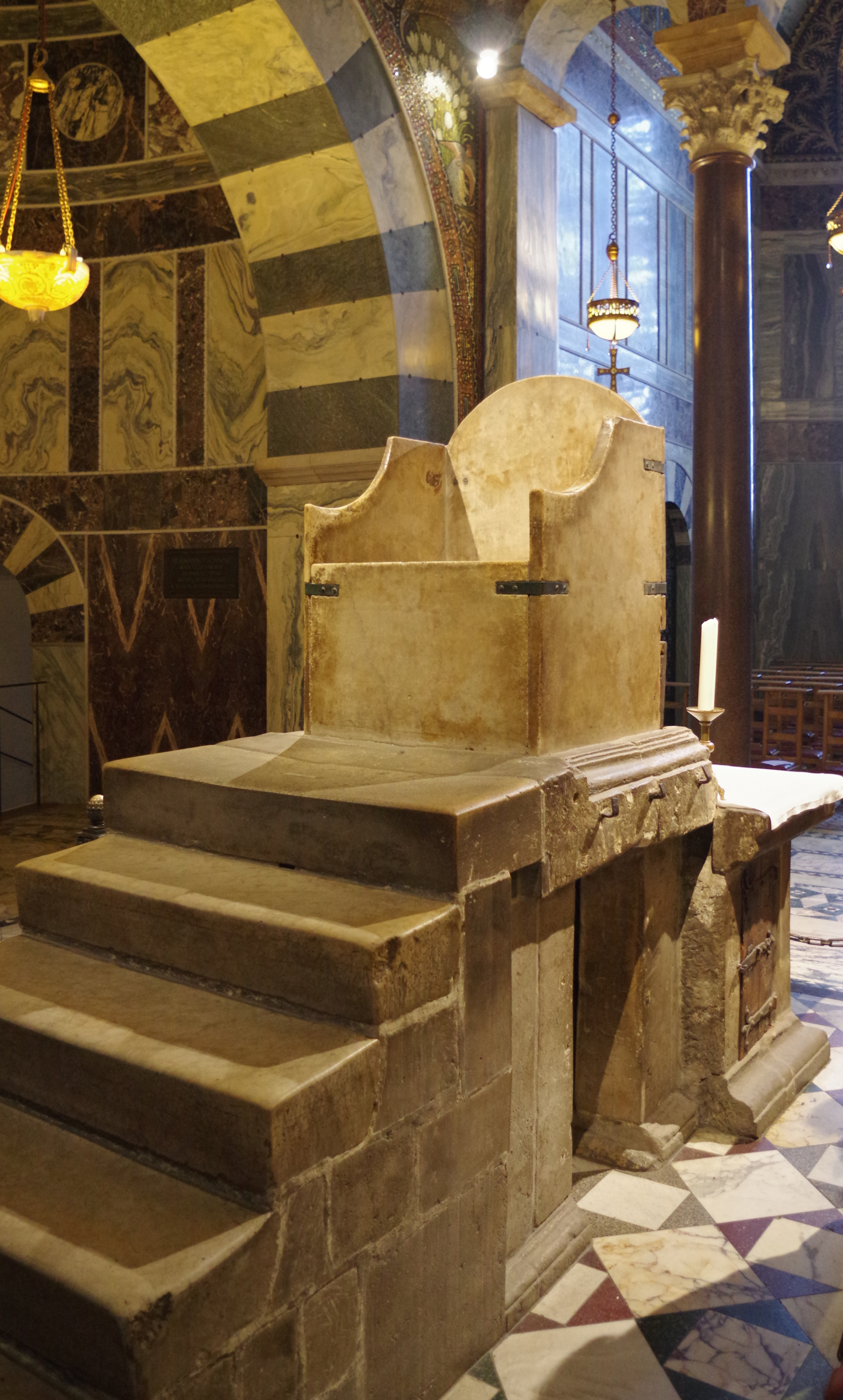
The royal Throne of Charlemagne in Aachen Cathedral

King of the Romans (Latin: Rex Romanorum; German: König der Römer) was a royal title used by the king of East Francia following his election by the princes from the reign of Henry II (1002–1024) onward.

The title originally referred to any German king between his election and coronation as Holy Roman Emperor by the Pope. The title was also used to designate the successor to the throne elected during the lifetime of a sitting Emperor. From the 16th century onwards, as German kings adopted the title of Emperor-elect and ceased to be crowned by the Pope, the title continued to be used solely for an elected successor to the throne during his predecessor's lifetime.

The actual title varied over time. During the Ottonian period, it was King of the Franks (German: König der Franken, Latin: Rex Francorum), from the late Salian period it was King of the Romans (German: König der Römer, Lat.: Rex Romanorum). In the Modern Period, the title King in Germania (German: König in Germanien, Lat.: Germaniae Rex) came into use. Finally, modern German historiography established the term Roman-German King (Römisch-deutscher König) to differentiate it from the classical Roman Emperor as well as from the Roman-German Emperor and from the modern German Emperor.

== Ruling kings ==
=== History and usage ===
The territory of East Francia was not referred to as the Kingdom of Germany or Regnum Teutonicum by contemporary sources until the 11th century. During this time, the king's claim to coronation was increasingly contested by the papacy, culminating in the fierce Investiture Controversy. After the Salian heir apparent Henry IV, a six-year-old minor, had been elected to rule the Empire in 1056 he adopted Romanorum Rex as a title to emphasize his sacred entitlement to be crowned Emperor by the Pope. Pope Gregory VII insisted on using the derogatory term Teutonicorum Rex ("King of the Germans") in order to imply that Henry's authority was merely local and did not extend over the whole Empire. Henry continued to regularly use the title Romanorum Rex until he finally was crowned Emperor by Antipope Clement III in 1084. Henry's successors imitated this practice, and were also called Romanorum Rex before and Romanorum Imperator after their Roman coronations.

=== Medieval practice ===
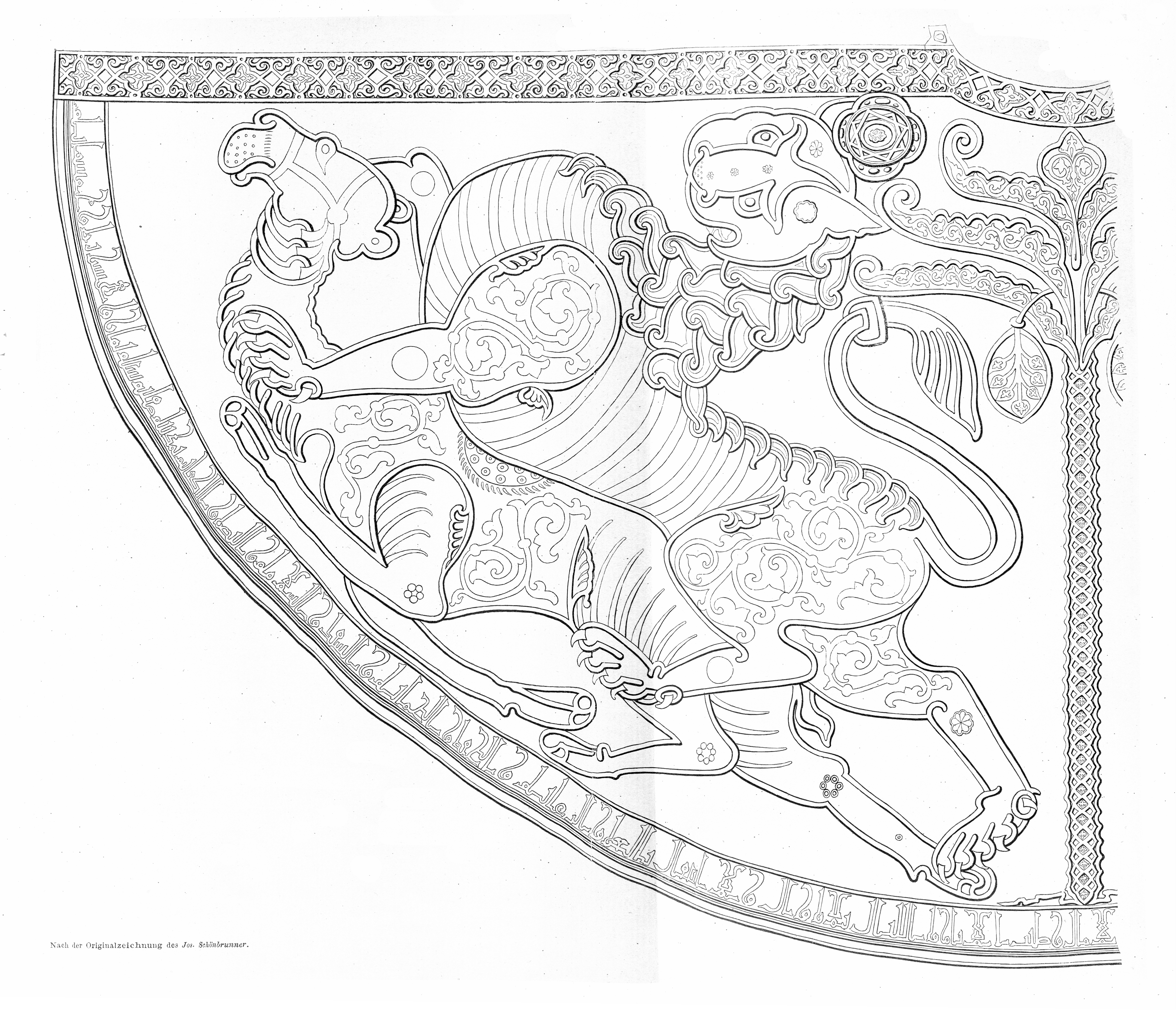
Detail of the imperial coronation mantle, drawing from 1857

Candidates for the kingship were at first the heads of Germanic stem duchies. As these units broke up, rulers of smaller principalities and even non-Germanic rulers were considered for the position. The only requirements generally observed were that the candidate be an adult male, a Catholic Christian, and not in holy orders. The kings were elected by several Imperial Estates (secular princes as well as Prince-Bishops), often in the imperial city of Frankfurt after 1147, a custom recorded in the Schwabenspiegel code in about 1275.

Originally all noblemen present could vote by unanimous acclamation, but later a franchise was granted to only the most eminent bishops and noblemen, and according to the Golden Bull of 1356 issued by Emperor Charles IV only the seven Prince-electors had the right to participate in a majority voting as determined by the 1338 Declaration of Rhense. They were the Prince-Archbishops of Mainz, Trier and Cologne as well as the King of Bohemia, the Count Palatine of the Rhine, the Saxon duke, and the Margrave of Brandenburg. After the Investiture Controversy, Charles intended to strengthen the legal status of the Rex Romanorum beyond Papal approbation. Consequently, among his successors only Sigismund and Frederick III were still crowned Emperors in Rome and in 1530 Charles V was the last king to receive the Imperial Crown at the hands of the Pope Clement VII (in Bologna). The Golden Bull remained effective as constitutional law until the Empire's dissolution in 1806.

After his election, the new king would be crowned as King of the Romans (Romanorum Rex), usually at Charlemagne's throne in Aachen Cathedral by the Archbishop of Cologne in a solemnly celebrated ceremony. The details of Otto's coronation in 936 are described by the medieval chronicler Widukind of Corvey in his Res gestae saxonicae. The kings received the Imperial Crown from at least 1024, at the coronation of Conrad II. In 1198 the Hohenstaufen candidate Philip of Swabia was crowned Rex Romanorum at Mainz Cathedral (as was King Rupert centuries later), but he had another coronation in Aachen after he had prevailed against his Welf rival Otto IV.

At some time after the ceremony, the king would, if possible, cross the Alps, to receive coronation in Pavia or Milan with the Iron Crown of Lombardy as King of Italy. Finally, he would travel to Rome and be crowned Emperor by the Pope. Because it was rarely possible for the elected King to proceed immediately to Rome for his crowning, several years might elapse between election and coronation, and some Kings never completed the journey to Rome at all. As a suitable title for the King between his election and his coronation as Emperor, Romanorum Rex would stress the plenitude of his authority over the Empire and his warrant to be future Emperor (Imperator futurus) without infringing upon the Papal privilege.

Not all Kings of the Romans made this step, sometimes because of hostile relations with the Pope, or because either the pressure of business at home or warfare in Germany or Italy made it impossible for the King to make the journey. In such cases, the king might retain the title "King of the Romans" for his entire reign.

=== Later developments ===
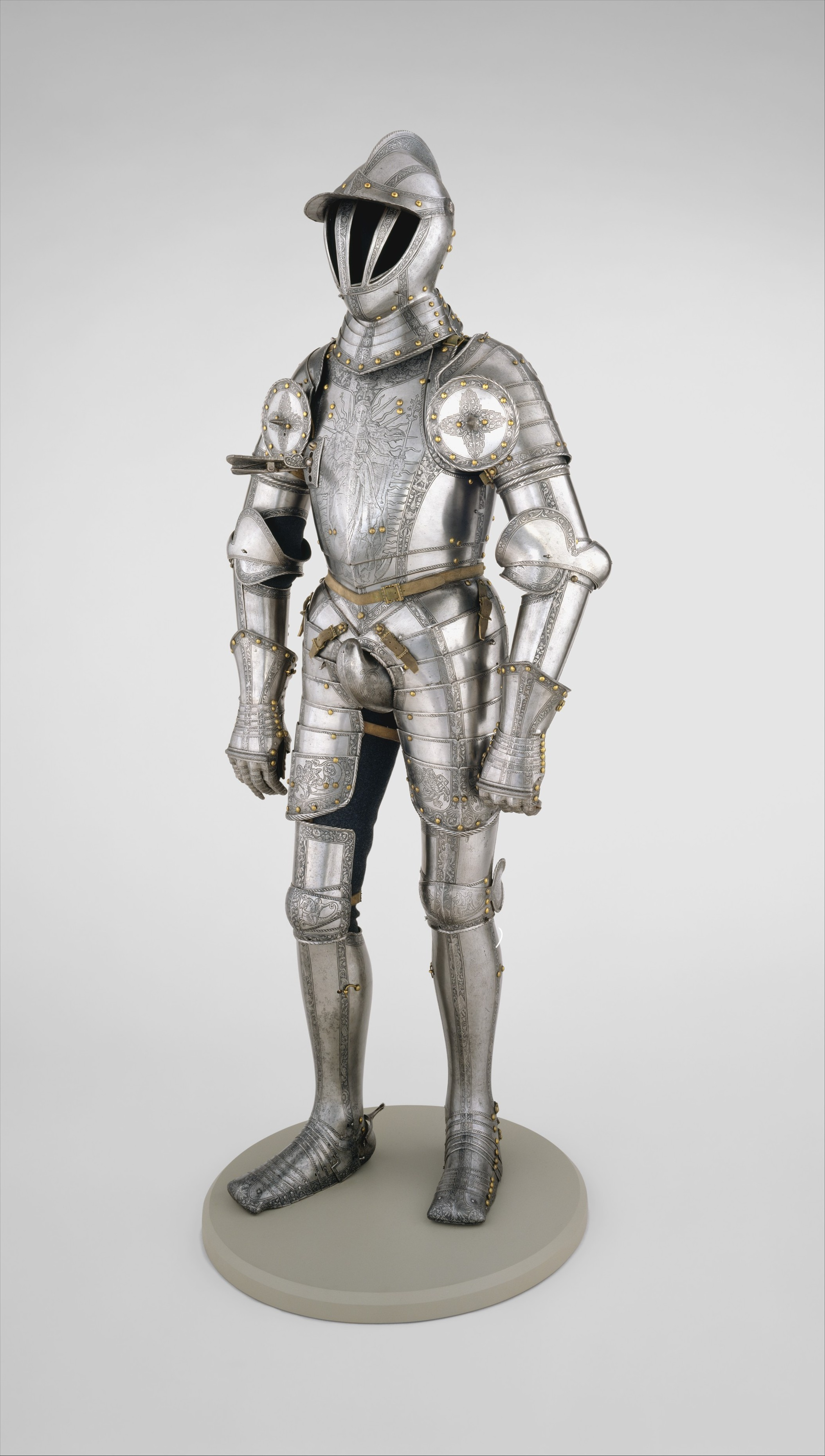
Armor of Ferdinand I, Holy Roman Emperor, created when he was still King of the Romans in 1549.

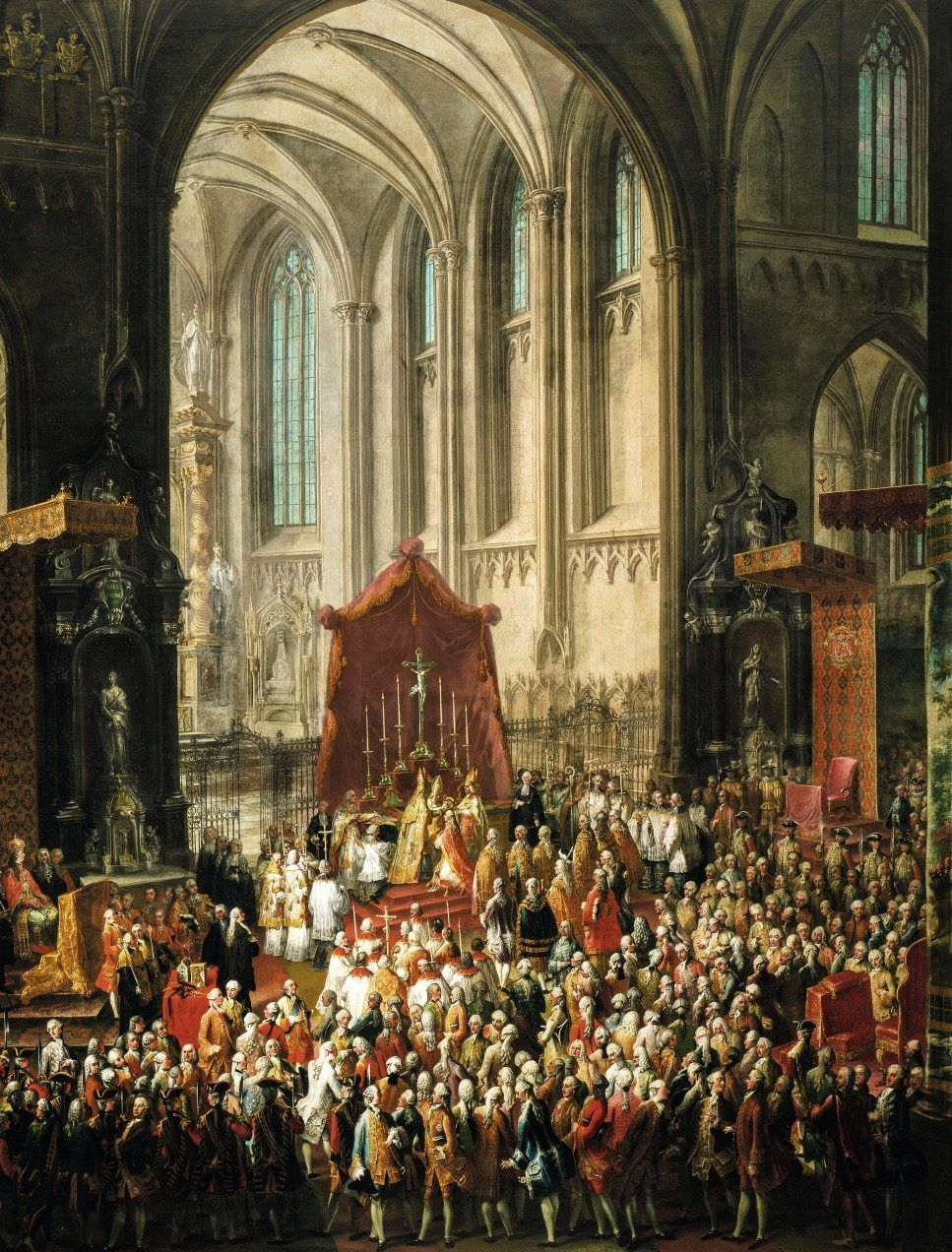
Coronation of Archduke Joseph as King of the Romans in the Imperial Cathedral of Saint Bartholomew in Frankfurt, 3 April 1764

The title Romanorum Rex ceased to be used for ruling kings after 1508, when the Pope permitted King Maximilian I to use the title of Electus Romanorum Imperator ("elected Emperor of the Romans") after he failed in a good-faith attempt to journey to Rome. At this time Maximilian also took the new title "King in Germania" (Germaniae rex, German: König in Germanien), but the latter was never used as a primary title.

Maximilian's titles read, in part: "Maximilian von Gots genaden erwelter Romischer kayser, zu allen zeiten merer des Reichs, in Germanien zu Hungern, Dalmatien, Croatien etc. kunig [...] ("Maximilian, by God's grace Elected Roman Emperor, always Augustus, in Germany, of Hungary, Dalamatia, Croatia etc King [...]").

Beginning with Ferdinand I, the rulers of the Empire no longer sought the Imperial coronation by the Pope and styled themselves "Emperors" without Papal approval, taking the title as soon as they were crowned in Germany or, if crowned in their predecessor's lifetime, upon the death of a sitting Emperor.

== Heirs designate ==
The Holy Roman Empire was an elective monarchy. No person had an automatic legal right to the succession simply because he was related to the current Emperor. However, the Emperor could, and often did, have a relative (usually a son) elected to succeed him after his death. This elected heir apparent bore the title "King of the Romans".

During the Middle Ages, a junior King of the Romans was normally chosen only when the senior ruler bore the title of Emperor, so as to avoid having two, theoretically equal kings. Only on one occasion (1147–1150) was there both a ruling King of the Romans (King Conrad III) and a King of the Romans as heir (Henry Berengar). This practice continued from the 16th century onwards as the rulers of the Empire assumed the title "Emperor elect" without Imperial coronation by the Pope. The title of a King of the Romans now exclusively refers to the elected successor during his predecessor's lifetime.

The election was in the same form as that of the senior ruler. In practice, however, the actual administration of the Empire was always managed by the Emperor (or Emperor elect), with at most certain duties delegated to the heir.

=== King of Rome ===
When Napoleon I, Emperor of the French, had a son and heir, Napoleon II (1811–1832), he introduced the title King of Rome (Roi de Rome), styling his son as such at birth. The boy was known colloquially by this title throughout his short life. However, from 1818 onwards he was officially styled Duke of Reichstadt by his maternal grandfather, Emperor Francis I of Austria, who had reigned until 1806 as the last Holy Roman Emperor.

== List ==
The following list shows all individuals bearing the title "Kings of the Romans". The regnal dates given are those between a king's election as "King of the Romans" and either becoming Emperor or ending their reign by deposition or death. Ruling kings are coloured in yellow, while those whose claim to the throne failed to achieve widespread support are coloured in pink. Individuals that bore the title "Kings of the Romans" solely as heirs designate are coloured in silver. '* ' indicates that the king in question was elected in his predecessor's lifetime.

King	Kingship begins	Kingship ends		Notes
Henry II	1002	1014	crowned Emperor	Effective rule: 1002–1024
Conrad II	1024	1027	crowned Emperor	Effective rule: 1024 – 4 June 1039
Henry III	1028*	1046	crowned Emperor	* elected as son and heir of Emperor Conrad II effective rule: 4 June 1039 – 5 October 1056
Henry IV	17 July 1054*	1084	crowned Emperor	* elected as son and heir of Emperor Henry III effective rule: 5 October 1056 – 31 December 1105
Rudolf of Rheinfelden	25 May 1077	15 October 1080	killed in battle	Anti-king to Henry IV
Hermann of Salm	6 August 1081	28 September 1088	killed in battle	Anti-king to Henry IV
Conrad (III)	30 May 1087*	1098	deposed	* elected as son and heir of Emperor Henry IV rebelled in 1093 and was deposed
Henry V	6 January 1099*	13 April 1111	crowned Emperor	* elected as son and heir of Emperor Henry IV rebelled in 1105 and deposed his father effective rule: 31 December 1105 – 23 May 1125
Lothair III	13 September 1125	4 June 1133	crowned Emperor	Effective rule: 13 September 1125 – 4 December 1137
Conrad III	1127	1135	renounced claim	Anti-king to Lothair III
Conrad III	7 March 1138	15 February 1152	died	Effective rule: 7 March 1138 — 15 February 1152
Henry Berengar	30 March 1147	1150	died	elected as son and heir of King Conrad III, predeased his father
Frederick I Barbarossa	4 March 1152	18 June 1155	crowned Emperor	Effective rule: 4 March 1152 – 10 June 1190
Henry VI	15 August 1169*	15 April 1191	crowned Emperor	* elected as son and heir of Emperor Frederick I effective rule: 10 June 1190 – 28 September 1197
Frederick II	1196*	28 September 1197	claim ignored; crowned Emperor	* elected as son and heir of Emperor Henry VI
Philip of Swabia	8 March 1198	21 June 1208	murdered	elected in opposition to Otto IV effective rule: 8 March 1198 – 21 June 1208
Otto IV	9 June 1198	21 October 1209	crowned Emperor	in opposition to Philip until 1208, opposed by Frederick II after 1212 effective rule: 9 June 1198 – 5 July 1215
Frederick II	5 December 1212	22 November 1220	crowned Emperor	elected in opposition to Otto IV effective rule: 5 July 1215 – 26 December 1250
Henry (VII)	April 1220*	2 July 1235	deposed	* elected as son and heir of Emperor Frederick II, later deposed by his father
Conrad IV	February 1237*	21 May 1254	died	* elected as son and heir of Emperor Frederick II effective rule: 26 December 1250 – 21 May 1254
Henry Raspe	22 May 1246	16 February 1247	died	Anti-king to Fredrick II
William of Holland	3 October 1247	28 January 1256	died	Anti-king until 21 May 1254
Richard of Cornwall	13 January 1257	2 April 1272	died	Elected in opposition to Alfonso X of Castile
Alfonso X of Castile	1 April 1257	1275	renounced claim	Elected in opposition to Richard of Cornwall
Rudolf I	29 September 1273	15 July 1291	died	
Adolph of Nassau	5 May 1292	2 July 1298	killed in battle	
Albert I	24 June 1298	1 May 1308	murdered	Originally elected in opposition to Adolf of Nassau; Effective rule: 2 July 1298 – 1 May 1308
Henry VII	27 November 1308	29 June 1312	crowned Emperor	Effective rule: 27 November 1308 – 24 August 1313
Louis IV	20 October 1314	17 January 1328	crowned Emperor	Elected in opposition to Frederick the Fair; Effective rule: 20 October 1314 – 11 October 1347
Frederick the Fair	19 October 1314	28 September 1322	captured	Elected in opposition to Louis IV
Frederick the Fair	5 September 1325	3 January 1330	died	Ruled jointly with Louis IV
Charles IV	11 July 1346	5 April 1355	crowned Emperor	Originally elected in opposition to Louis IV; Effective rule: 11 July 1346 – 29 November 1378
Günther von Schwarzburg	30 January 1349	24 May 1349	died	Elected in opposition to Charles IV
Wenceslaus	10 June 1376*	20 August 1400	deposed	* elected as son and heir of Emperor Charles IV; Effective rule: 29 November 1378 – 20 August 1400
Rupert of the Palatinate	21 August 1400	18 May 1410	died	Deposed Wenceslaus and was elected by the three ecclesiastical electors and his own vote.
Sigismund	10 September 1410; 21 July 1411	3 May 1433	crowned Emperor	Elected in opposition to Jobst of Moravia, then unanimously elected again effective rule: 10 September 1410 – 9 December 1437
Jobst of Moravia	1 October 1410	8 January 1411	died	Elected in opposition to Sigismund
Albert II	18 March 1438	27 October 1439	died	
Frederick III	2 February 1440	16 March 1452	crowned Emperor	Effective rule: 2 February 1440 – 19 August 1493
Maximilian I	16 February 1486*	4 February 1508	assumed title of Emperor elect	* elected as son and heir of Emperor Frederick III; Effective rule: 19 August 1493 – 12 January 1519 introduced the title Rex in Germania.
Ferdinand I	5 January 1531*	27 August 1556	succeeded as Emperor elect	* elected as brother and heir of Emperor Charles V Effective rule: 27 August 1556 – 25 July 1564
Maximilian II	28 November 1562*	25 July 1564	succeeded as Emperor elect	* elected as son and heir of Emperor Ferdinand I Effective rule: 25 July 1564 – 12 October 1576
Rudolph II	27 October 1575*	12 October 1576	succeeded as Emperor elect	* elected as son and heir of Emperor Maximilian II; Effective rule: 12 October 1576 – 20 January 1612
Ferdinand III	22 December 1636*	15 February 1637	succeeded as Emperor elect	* elected as son and heir of Emperor Ferdinand II; Effective rule: 15 February 1637 – 2 April 1657
Ferdinand IV	31 May 1653	9 July 1654	died	* elected as son and heir of Emperor Ferdinand III, predeceased his father
Joseph I	23 January 1690	5 May 1705	succeeded as Emperor elect	* elected as son and heir of Emperor Leopold I Effective rule: 5 May 1705 – 17 April 1711
Joseph II	27 March 1764	18 August 1765	succeeded as Emperor elect	* elected as son and heir of Emperor Francis I Effective rule: 18 August 1765 – 20 February 1790

== See also ==
- List of German monarchs, rulers of the Holy Roman Empire and Germany, including those using titles other than "King of the Romans"
- List of Holy Roman Emperors
- Emperor of the Romans
