= Jean Cousin the Elder =

French painter, sculptor, etcher, engraver and geometrician

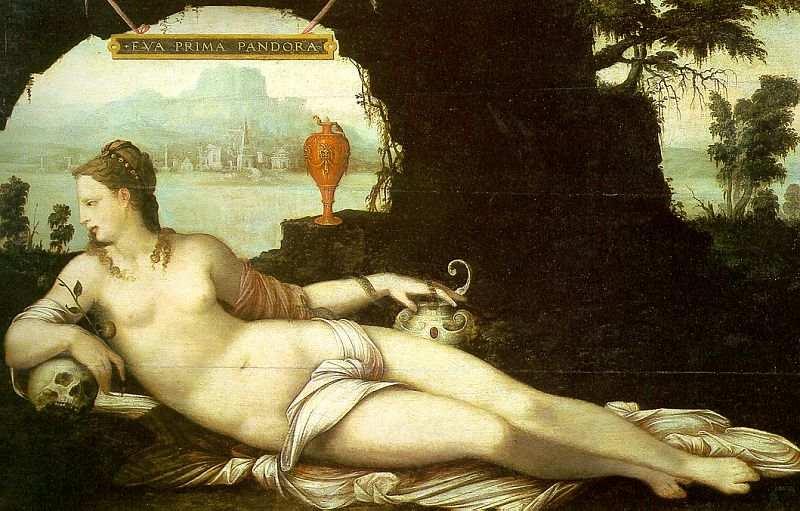
Jean Cousin the Elder, Eva Prima Pandora, Louvre, Paris, 1550

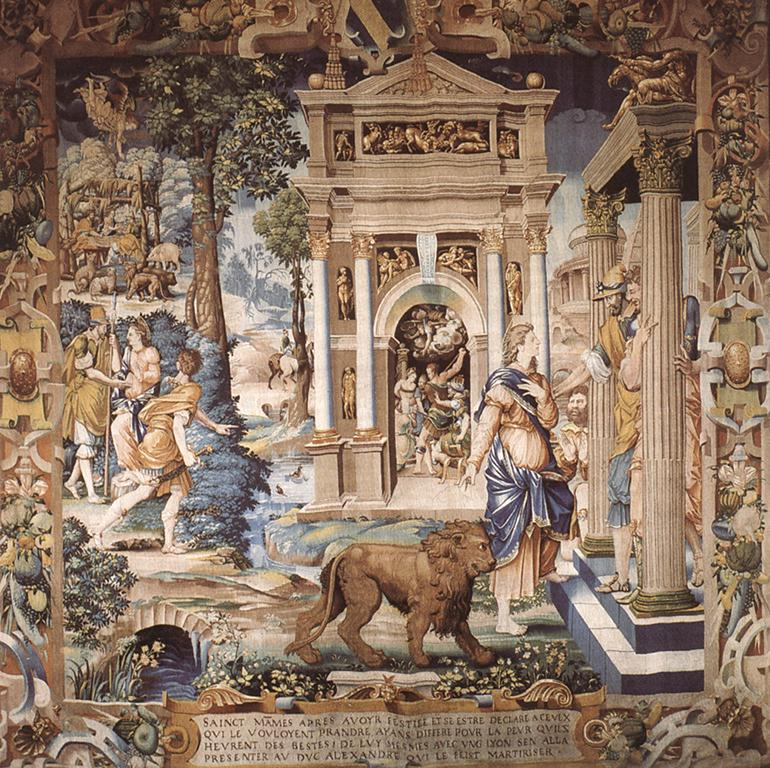
Jean Cousin the Elder, Saint Mammes and Duke Alexander , Louvre, Paris, 1541, tapestry

Jean Cousin (1500 – before 1593) was a French painter, sculptor, etcher, engraver, and geometrician. He is known as "Jean Cousin the Elder" to distinguish him from his son Jean Cousin the Younger, also an artist.

== Career ==
Cousin was born at Soucy, near Sens, and began his career in his native town with the study of glass-painting under Jean Hympe and Grassot. At the same time, he studied mathematics and published a successful book on the subject. He also wrote on geometry in his student days. In 1530 Cousin finished the windows for Sens Cathedral, the subject chosen being the "Legend of St. Eutropius". He also painted the windows of many of the noble châteaux in and around the city. The latest date on any of his Sens work, 1530, points to this as the year he went to Paris, where he began work as a goldsmith; but the amount and kind of his productions in the precious metals are alike unknown.

In Paris Cousin continued his career as a glass-painter, and created his best-known work, the windows of the Sainte-Chapelle in Vincennes. He subsequently devoted himself to painting in oil, and has been claimed as the first Frenchman to use that new medium. Pictures attributed to him, all of much merit, are found in several of the large European collections, but, excepting "The Last Judgment", none is known to be authentic. For a long time this work lay neglected in the sacristy of the church of the Minims, Vincennes, until it was rescued by a priest and transferred to the Louvre. It is said to be the first French picture to be engraved.

He was also an illustrator of books, making many designs for woodcuts and often executed them himself. The "Bible", published in 1596 by Le Clerc, and the Metamorphoses and Epistles of Ovid (1566 and 1571 respectively) contain his most noted work as an illustrator. Cousin etched and engraved many plates after the manner of Parmigianino, to whom the invention of etching has been ascribed. He also created sculptures, including, it is thought, the mausoleum of Admiral Philippe de Chabot. In addition to his early writings on mathematics, he published, in 1560, a treatise on perspective, and, in 1571, a work on portrait-painting. During his life Cousin enjoyed the favour of and worked for four kings of France: Henry II, Francis II, Charles IX, and Henry III. Among his paintings, mention should also be made of the miniatures in the prayer book of Henry II now in the Bibliothèque Nationale; among his etchings and engravings, the Annunciation and the Conversion of St. Paul; among his woodcuts, the Entrée de Henry II et Catherine de Médicis à Rouen (1551).

He died at Sens, but the date of his death is uncertain.

== Sources ==
- cites:
  - FIRMIN-DIDOT, Etude sur Jean Cousin (Paris, 1872);
  - PATTISON, The World's Painters since Leonardo (New York, 1906)
