= The Beheading of Saint John the Baptist (Giovanni di Paolo) =

Painting by Giovanni di Paolo

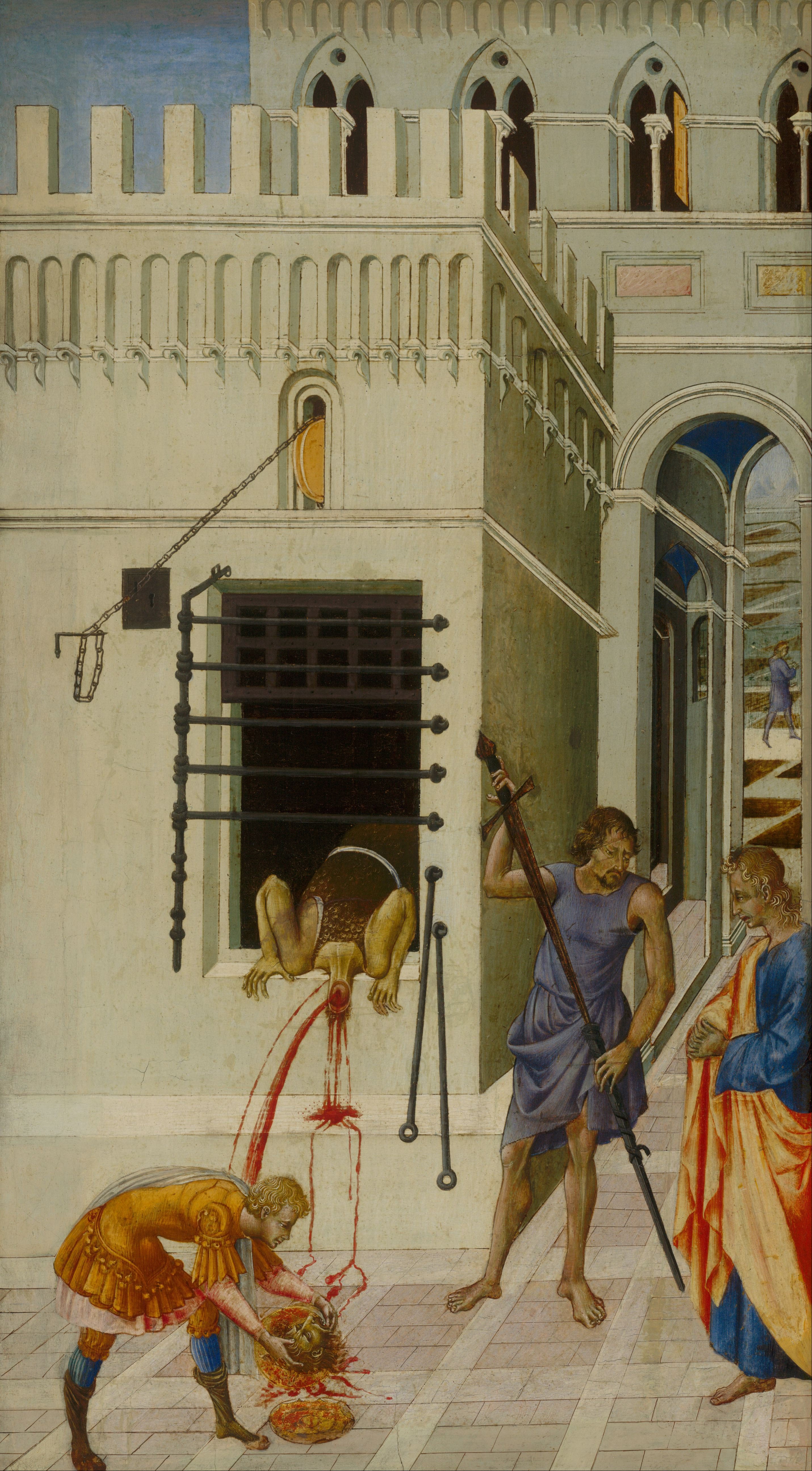
- Artist: Giovanni di Paolo
- Year: 1455–1460
- Medium: Tempera
- Dimensions: 68.6 cm × 39.1 cm (27.0 in × 15.4 in)
- Location: Art Institute of Chicago, Chicago
- Accession: 1933.1014

The Beheading of Saint John the Baptist is a 15th-century tempera painting by Giovanni di Paolo. It depicts the beheading of John the Baptist.
