= Giovanni di Paolo =

Italian painter and illustrator of manuscripts (c.1403-1482)

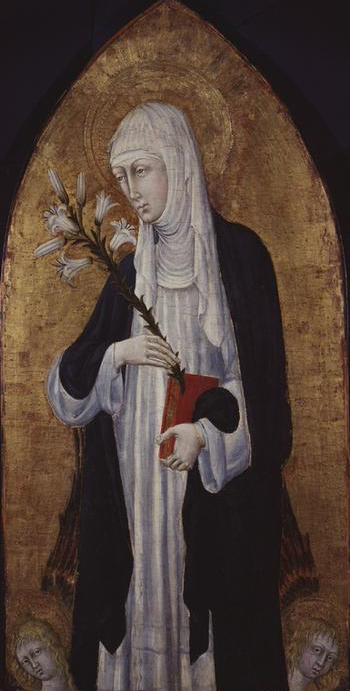
Giovanni di Paolo, St Catherine of Siena

Giovanni di Paolo di Grazia (c. 1403–1482) was an Italian painter, working primarily in Siena, becoming a prolific painter and illustrator of manuscripts, including Dante's texts. He was one of the most important painters of the 15th century Sienese School. His early works show the influence of earlier Sienese masters, but his later style was more individual, characterized by cold, harsh colours and elongated forms. His style also took on the influence of International Gothic artists such as Gentile da Fabriano. Many of his works have an unusual dreamlike atmosphere, such as the surrealistic Miracle of St. Nicholas of Tolentino painted about 1455 and now housed in the Philadelphia Museum of Art, while his last works, particularly Last Judgment, Heaven, and Hell from about 1465 and Assumption painted in 1475, both at Pinacoteca Nazionale (Siena), are grotesque treatments of their lofty subjects. Giovanni's reputation declined after his death but was revived in the 20th century.

== Early life and works ==
The exact year of the birth of Giovanni di Paolo di Grazia is unknown. He was first documented in 1417 working for the Sienese Dominican Order as a miniaturist (manuscript illuminator). Northern, Franco-Flemish influences have been discussed in his work, particularly in the landscapes, and some have speculated he apprenticed with the Limbourg Brothers who were in Siena about 1413, although this remains inconclusive, and apprenticeships with Taddeo di Bartolo and Martino di Bartolomeo have also been proposed. Most of Giovanni's commissions came from local monastic communities which is apparent because so many of his early works are altarpieces for such churches. For example, The Virgin and Christ Child with Saints Bernardino, Anthony Abbot, Francis and Sabina and The Lamentation Over the Dead Christ (1462–3), a "square panel painting" altarpiece commissioned by Pope Pius II (of the noble Sienese Piccolomini family) for his recently finished cathedral.

== Works and influences ==
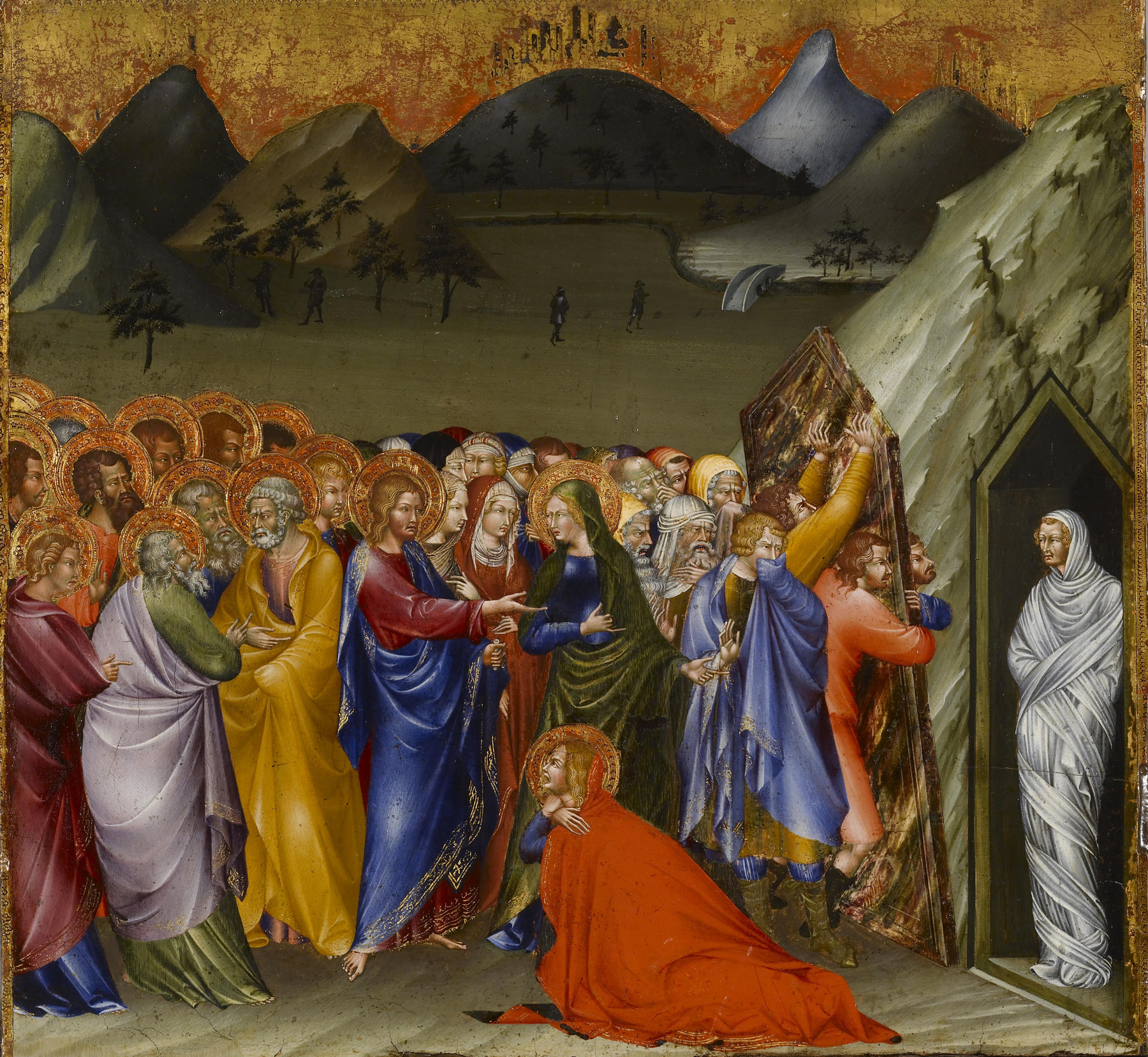
Raising of Lazarus by Giovanni di Paolo

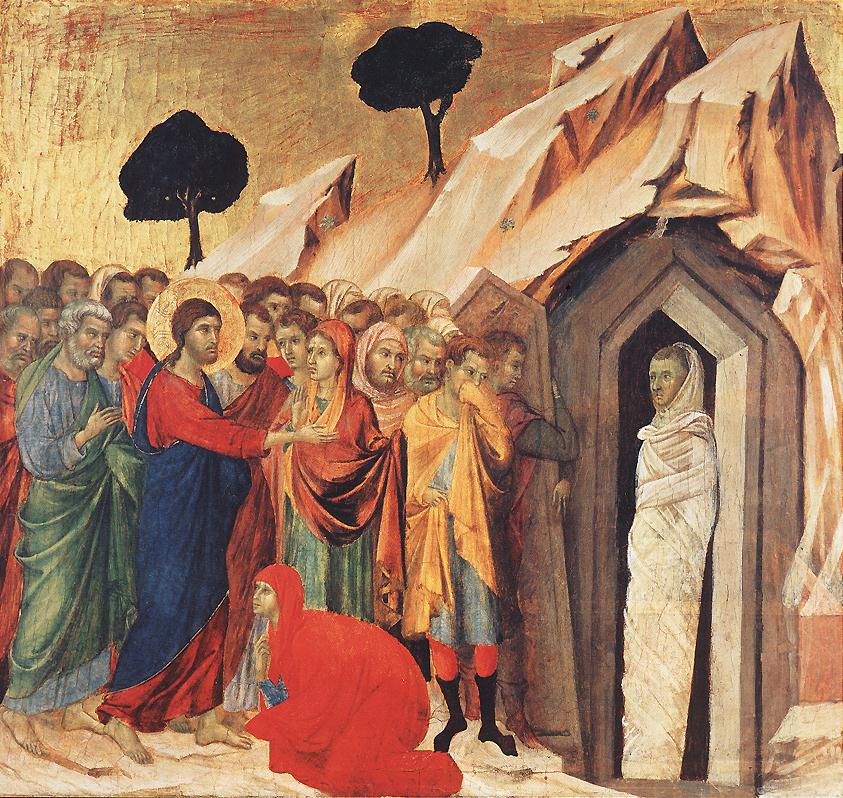
Raising of Lazarus by Duccio

Most of the paintings that Giovanni di Paolo is known for today are in fact panels and fragments from disassembled altarpieces and predellas. Notable examples include a series of panels depicting Saint Catherine of Siena, Saint Clare of Assisi, and Scenes from the Life of Saint John the Baptist, which are now all scattered in museums and collections throughout Europe and North America. Giovanni di Paolo is known to have painted four altarpieces for chapels in San Domenic: Christ Suffering and Triumphant (early 1420s), the Pecci Altarpiece (1426), the Branchini Altarpiece (1427), and the Guelfi Altarpiece (1445) which included Paradise now in the Metropolitan Museum of Art, New York. Giovanni di Paolo was influenced by many great artists in trecento and quattrocento Italy. It is believed that he may have owned a model book of other artists’ work he could flip through and use to fit his paintings. A few of these include the following: Gentile da Fabriano's two Florentine altarpieces, Ambrogio Lorenzetti's Presentation in the Temple, and the Baptistery reliefs by Donatello. He would then be able to alter, modify, and combine these artists’ works into his own renderings. Throughout his career one can see how this model book was utilized because of certain figures he repeatedly used, "His isolated detail, a single figure, or group copied from another image is shown that he is naturally drawn to the inventions of his fellow artists". However much it would be looked down upon today to copy, in trecento and quattrocento Siena the culture valued an artist that could manipulate others' work and make it their own as creatively as Giovanni did.

Giovanni di Paolo was influenced by many artists during his time, which can be seen in a number of his paintings. Giovanni's Raising of Lazarus is based on the same scene of Duccio's Maestà. "But where Duccio's figures are sober and restrained, Giovanni di Paolo's are voluble and animated". Giovanni was open to solutions other than the Sienese tradition which, "...made him receptive to sources farther afield as well". One of these is the occasion where he painted a picture he had drawn from a mural in Assisi". His work and style show the transition from the Sienese and Gothic style into the Renaissance.

His style also took on the influence of International Gothic artists such as Gentile da Fabriano. He was an artist of great consequence who had been invited by Pope Martin V to Rome. On his way to Rome, Gentile stopped in Siena, where Giovanni quickly assimilated Gentile's techniques. One technique he kept was Gentile's fascination with nature. Instead of using standing saints, as was customary, in his painting Giovanni used sprigs of flowering plants.

Giovanni di Paolo's Adoration of the Magi and Gentile da Fabriano's Adoration of the Magi are examples of how nature was used by both artists and how Giovanni was able to create the same use of animals and plants from Gentile and make it his own. Where Gentile was capable of darkness and mystery, Giovanni, "...saw nature as untarnished and ever-benign". These works of art that Giovanni integrated into his own were, "...waiting to be imbued with personal meaning" a creation Giovanni was able to do well.

It has been said that in his final years, although his imagination never weakened, his abilities to paint deteriorated and assistants helped in executing his work. He made his last will on 29 January 1484 and died sometime before 27 March of that year.

== Style ==
Later in his life, Giovanni became greatly skilled at painting illuminated manuscripts, he illuminated choir books for the Augustinian monks at Lecceto as well as Dante's Divine Comedy. The illuminations that he created for Dante's poem are some of his most famous and best-preserved works. His illuminations are one area where viewers can see how Giovanni di Paolo differentiates himself from other Sienese artists. He may have been in contact with Franco-Flemish illuminators, who had been in Siena during Giovanni's early years. It seems their Northern influence may have rubbed off on Giovanni because his landscapes resemble those in the famous painting by the Limbourg brothers; Tres Riches Heures. His suspected master, Taddeo di Bartolo, probably taught him how to paint with a "toughness of line", which can be seen in any of his works. The most striking quality of Giovanni di Paolo's work is the fantastical quality. John Pope-Hennessy explains Giovanni di Paolo's work eloquently, "Few experiences in Italian painting are more exciting than to follow Giovanni di Paolo as he plunges, like Alice, through the looking-glass. If one looks at the Madonna of Humility (1435) the checkerboard landscape confirms the world beyond the garden scene in the foreground (also referred to as the hortus conclusus). This checkerboard panorama effect is used frequently by Giovanni for its ability "to create an abstraction of space, whose appeal is not to the fixed optic of the spectator, so much as to the winged flight of the dream-voyager." .

== Illuminations of Dante's Paradiso ==
After being appointed rector of the painter's guild in 1441, Giovanni di Paolo was the clear choice to illuminate Dante's Paradiso. Working on what is known today as Yates Thompson 36 in the British Library's catalogue, Giovanni created 61 images to accompany the vernacular poem. Two other unknown artists worked on the Inferno and Purgatorio illuminations. Giovanni di Paolo used his unique style to create an obviously Tuscan panorama in a sun-filled world that is much lighter and fresher than the two previous artists of the Inferno and Purgatorio.

A panel painting created after, and inspired by, this cycle of illuminations is The Creation and The Expulsion from Paradise (1445) in the Lehman Collection of the Metropolitan Museum of Art. Giovanni created a unique image by showing two separate scenes in one: God floating above the universe and the expulsion of Adam and Eve. One theory is that God is simultaneously expelling Adam and Eve and banishing them to earth. But why then is his hand not pointing directly to the Earth? A viable argument for this question is that by following the gaze of God's gesture, the viewer's eye is led to a specific point on the Zodiac circle. Looking at the 11:00 position of the Zodiac circle, because it's the only symbol still recognizable, one can discern the symbol of Pisces, which is not in its traditional position. Following the circle, in the 12:00 position is Aires and in the 1:00 position is Taurus. Traditionally, in medieval times, these signs represent spring; more importantly to this image, they represent the season of the Feast of the Annunciation. God seems to point directly to the date of the feast, March 25. One proposed reasoning for such a gesture is that it is to remind the viewer of the Annunciation's significance, and to reflect upon "the purpose of the coming of Christ – to "repair the Fall" enacted by Adam and Eve in the adjoining sector of the panel, and to redeem the sins of man, which their Expulsion represents."

Another interesting part of this image is that Earth is encircled by multicoloured rings. One argument is because during this time a geocentric view of the universe was widely accepted, Giovanni was simply following Dante's description of a "terrestrial world bounded by the orbits of the heavenly spheres". This theory is often challenged by pointing out that Dante only assigns ten circles but Giovanni depicts twelve. Some scholars believe Giovanni was referencing a book called the Sphera, which was made for lay people to give them a better understanding of the universe based on Greek cosmology (Chaos), which would account for Giovanni's number of circles and also their colours.

== Gallery: tempera paintings ==
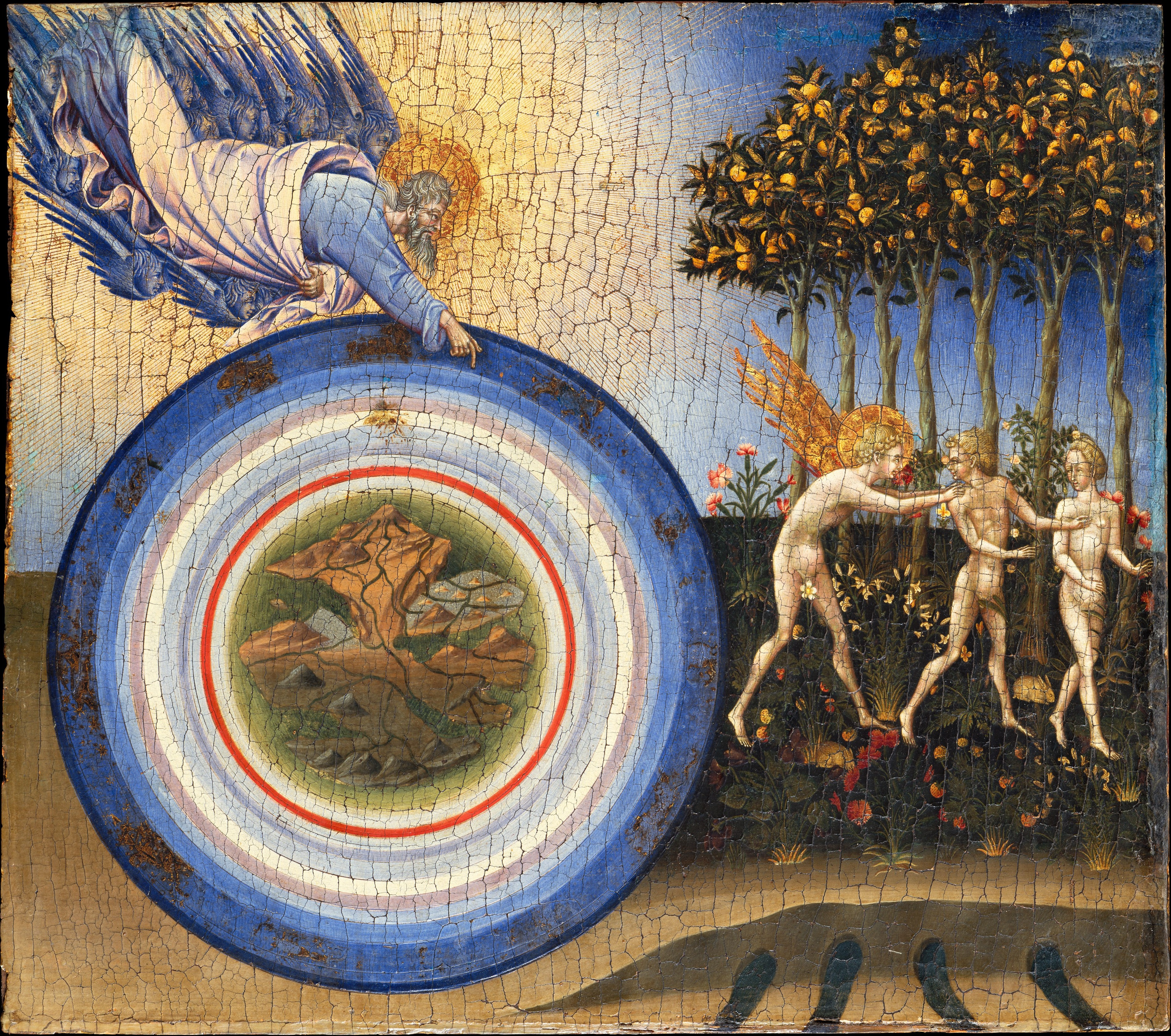
The Creation and the Expulsion from the Paradise (ca. 1438–44) Tempera & gold on wood (46.5 x 52 cm ) Metropolitan Museum of Art

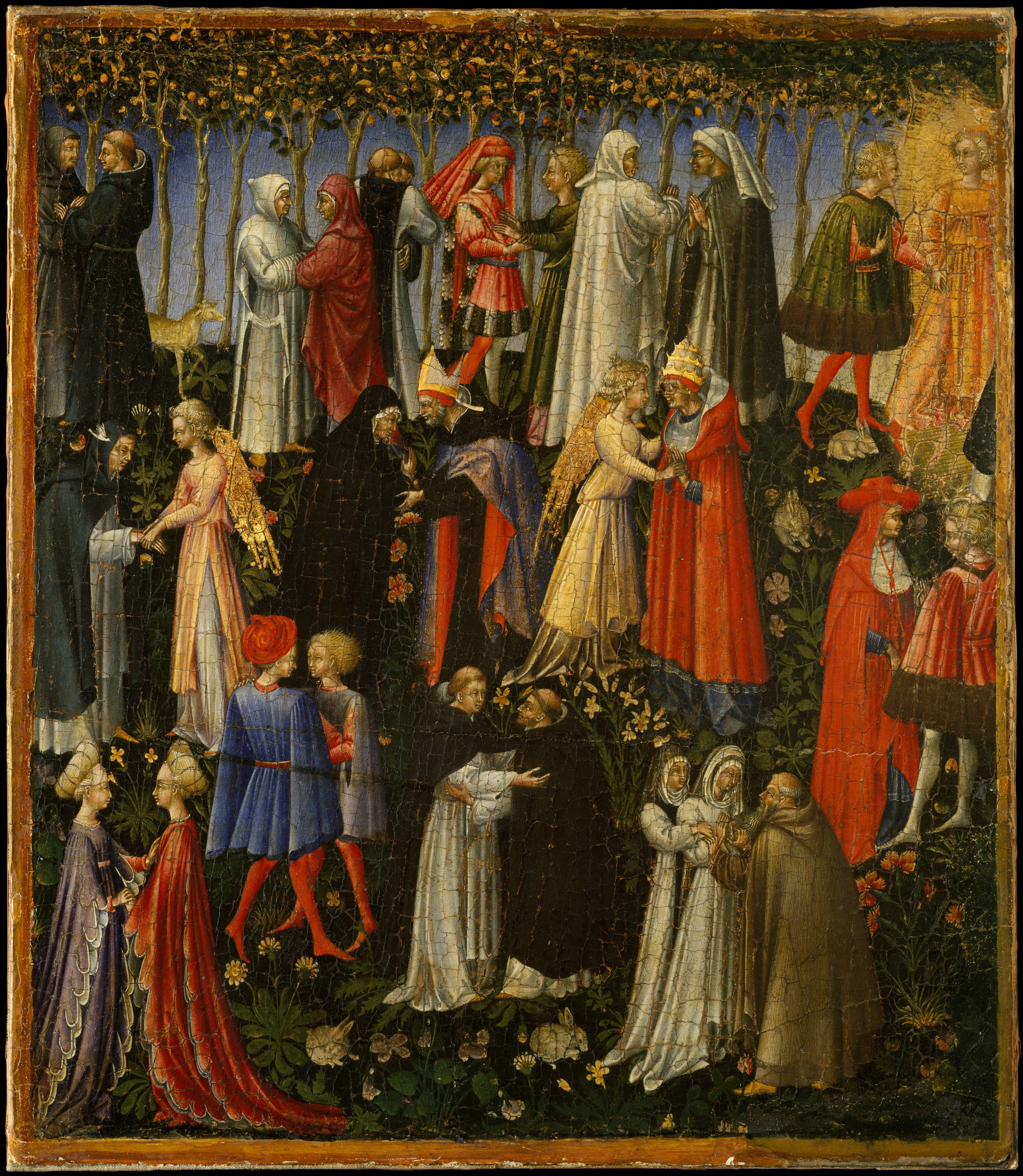
Paradise (1445) Tempera & gold on wood (44.5 x 38.4 cm) Metropolitan Museum of Art

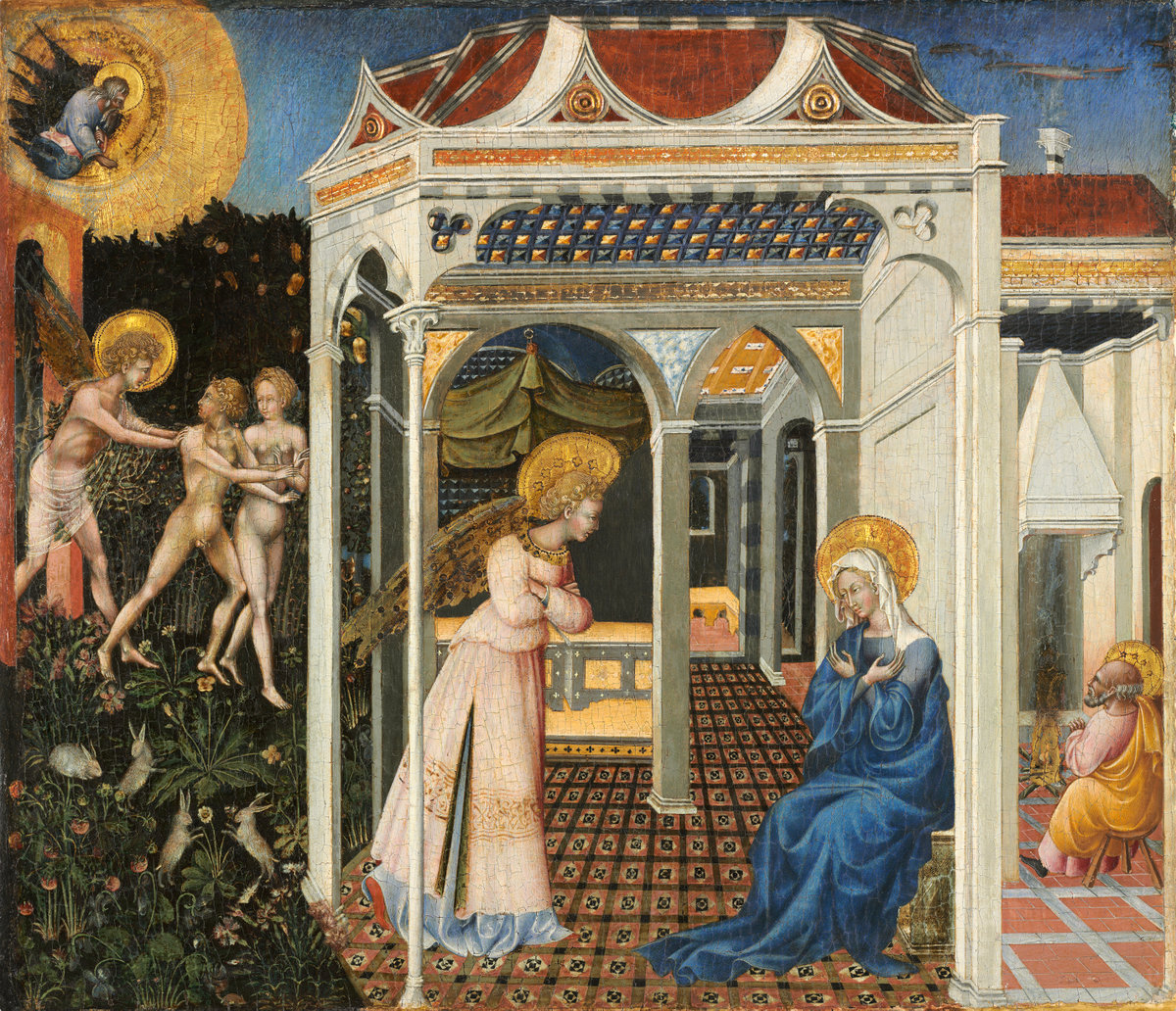
The Annunciation with The Expulsion of Adam and Eva from Paradise (1440–45) Tempera & gold on wood (40 x 46 cm.) National Gallery of Art, Washington

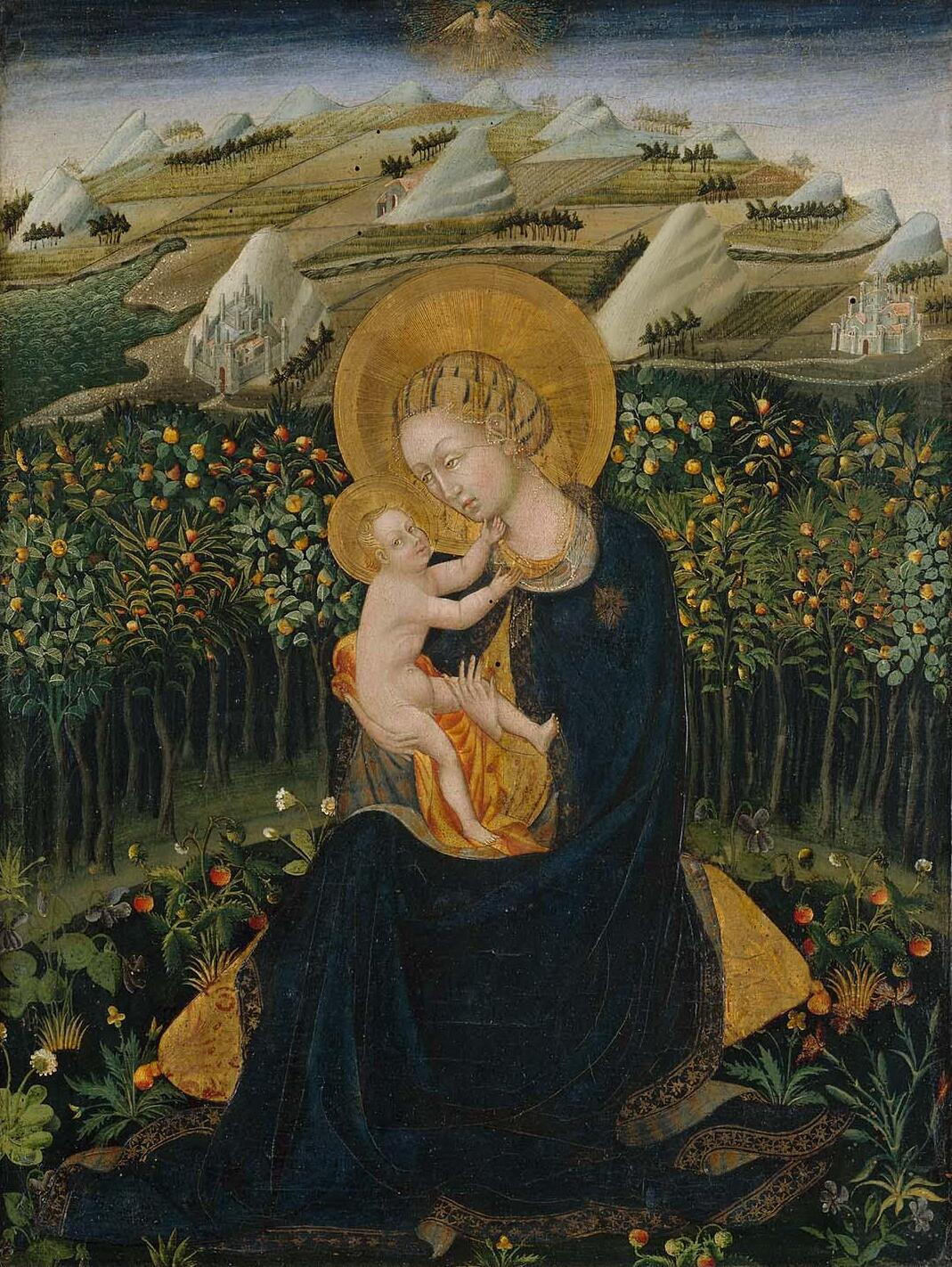
Madonna of Humility (ca. 1442) tempera on panel (61.9 cm x 48.9 cm.) Museum of Fine Arts, Boston

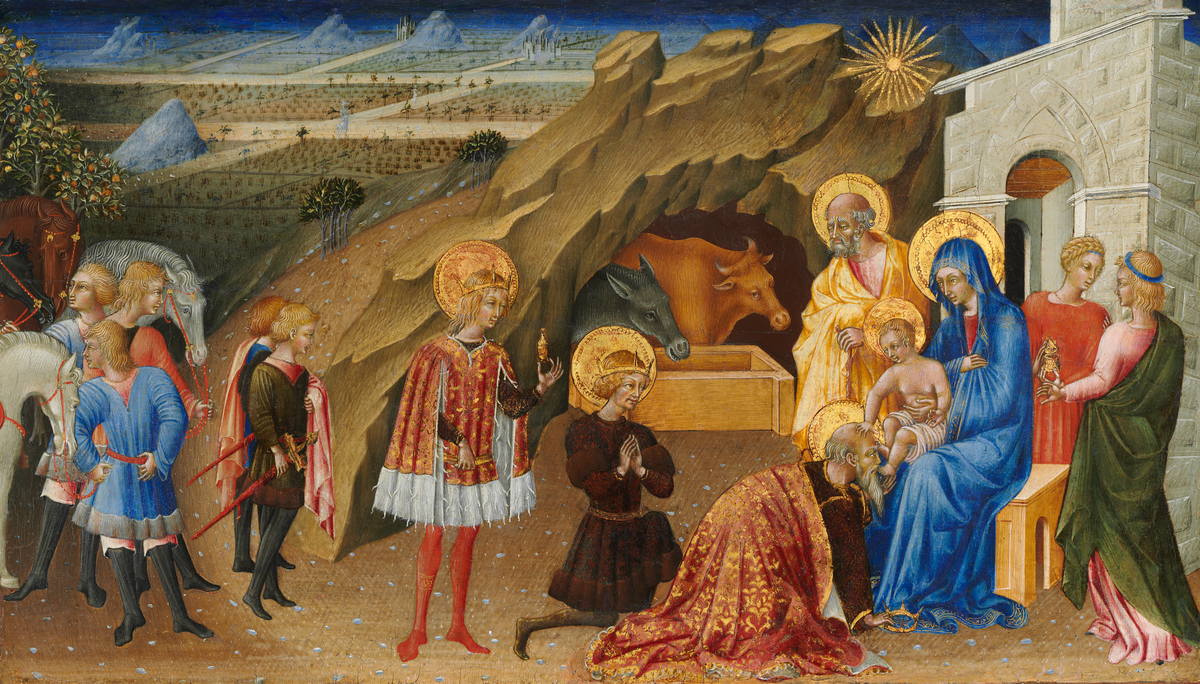
The Adoration of the Magi (ca. 1450) tempera on panel (10.5 x 18.25 in.) National Gallery of Art, Washington

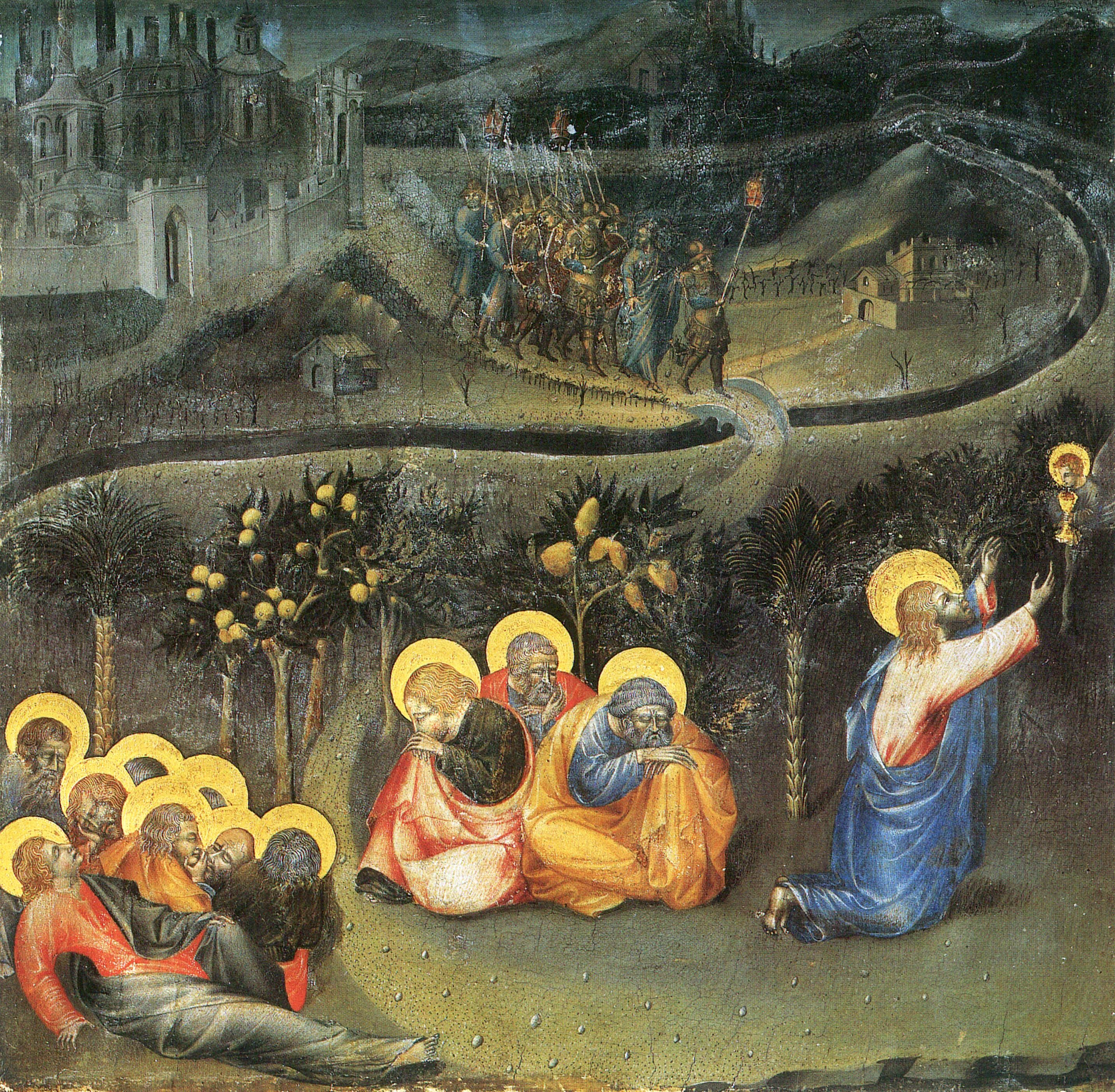
Christ in the Garden of Gethsemane (1430–35) tempera on wood (29 cm x 30 cm) Pinacoteca Vaticana

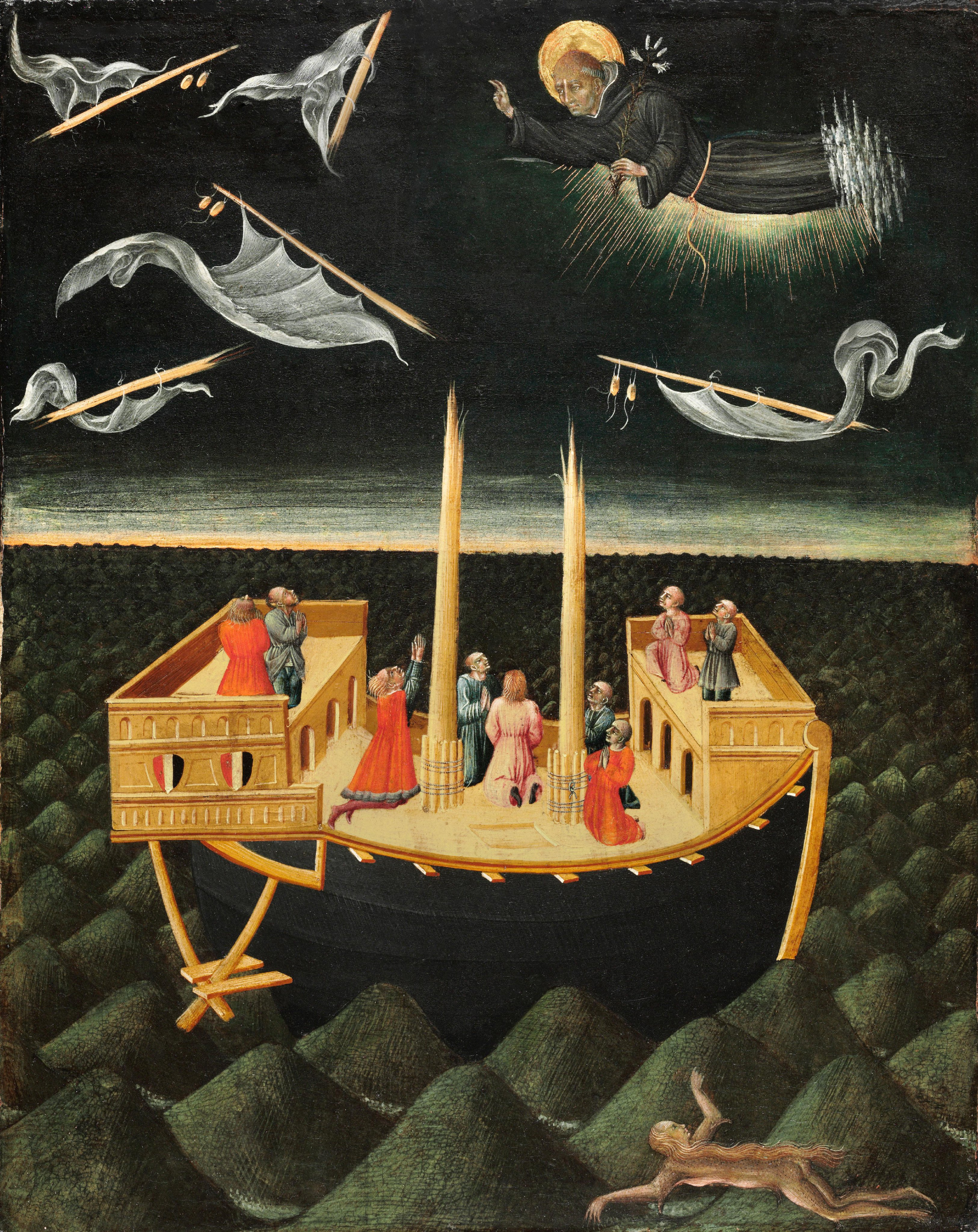
Saint Nicholas of Tolentino Saving a Shipwreck (1457) tempera and gold on panel (20.5 × 16.5 in,) Philadelphia Museum of Art

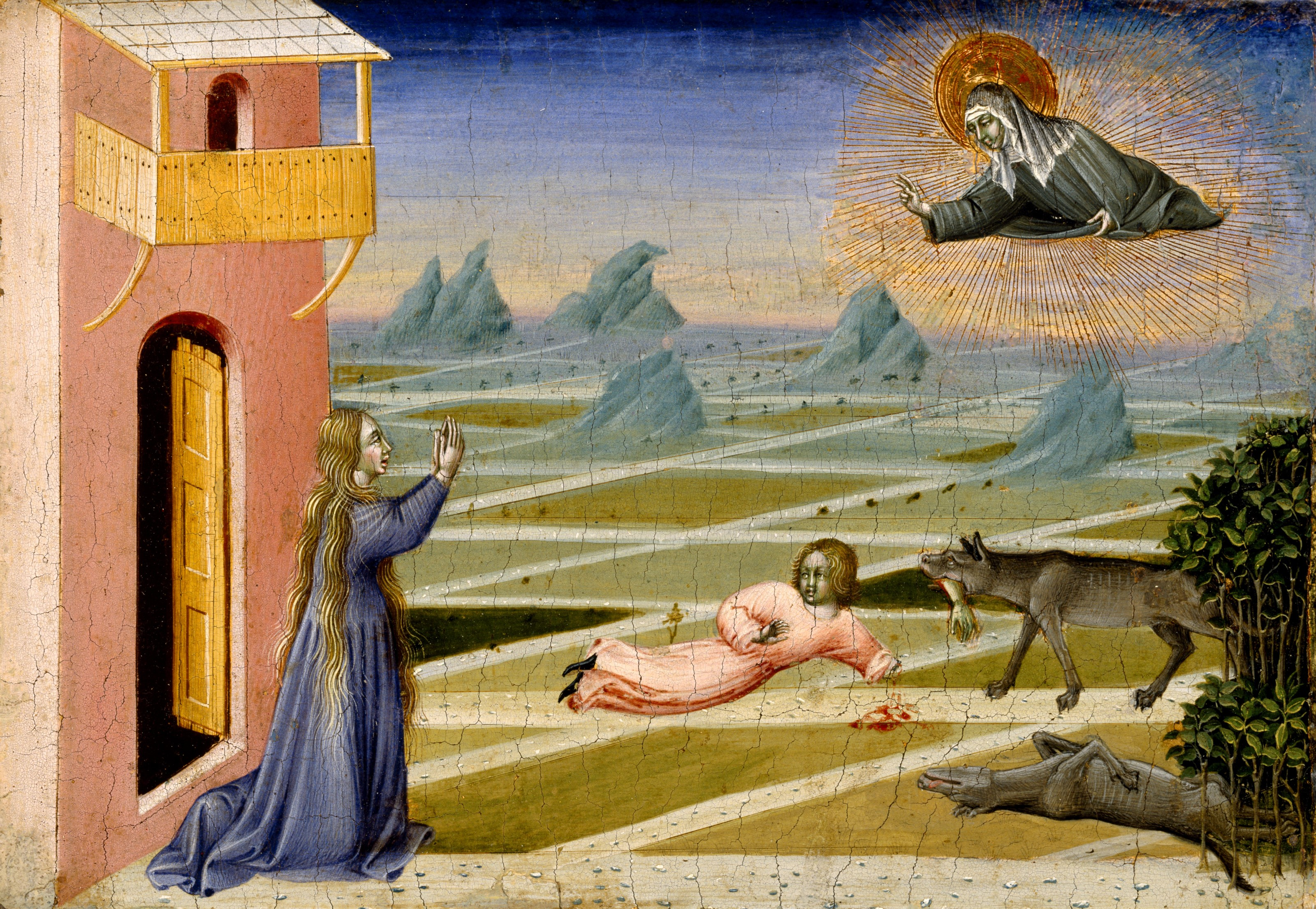
Saint Clare Rescuing a Child Mauled by a Wolf (ca. 1455–60) Tempera & gold on panel (28.1 x 20.6 cm) Museum of Fine Arts, Houston

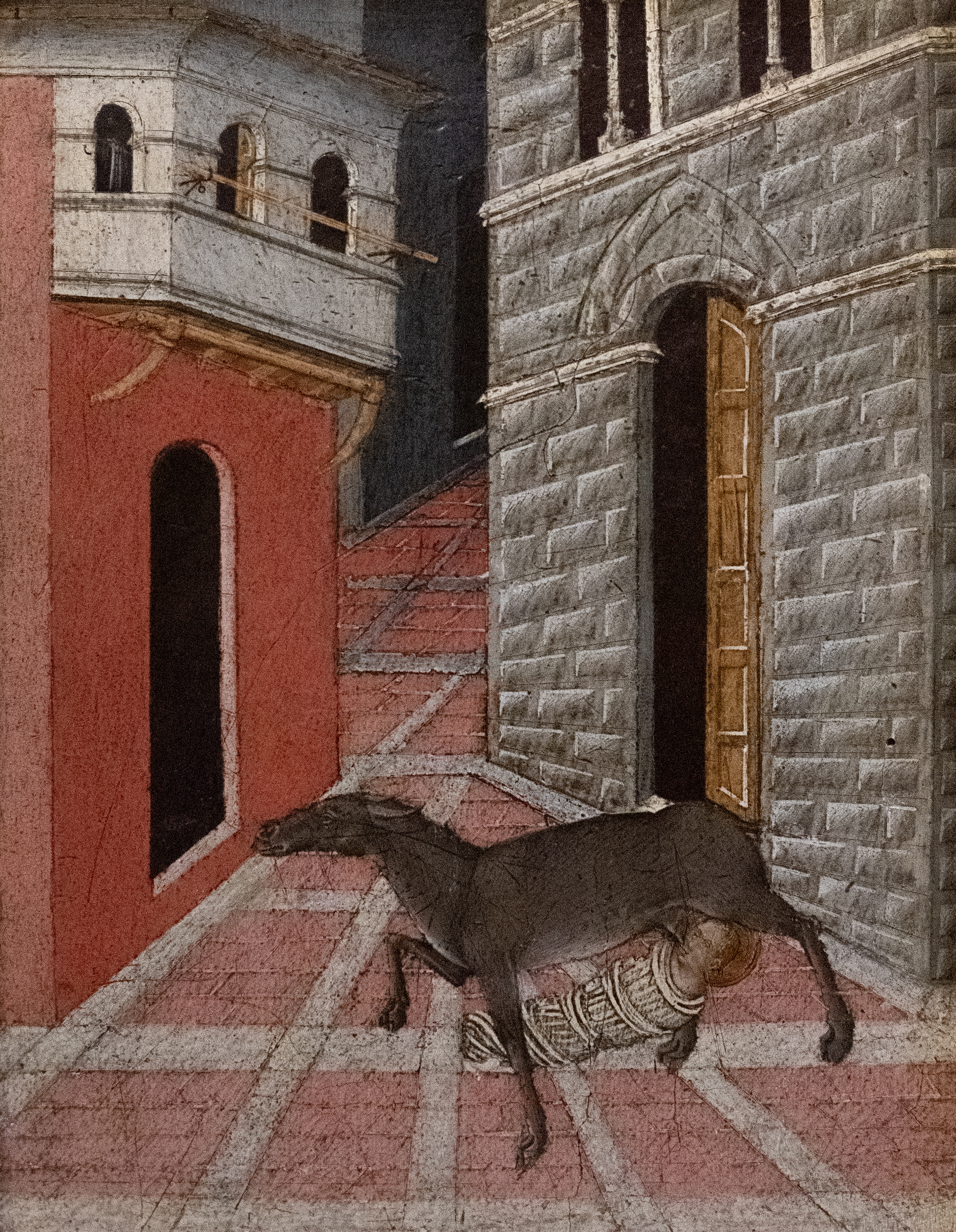
St Stephen Suckled by a Doe (1450) tempera on wood, Santo Stefano alla Lizza

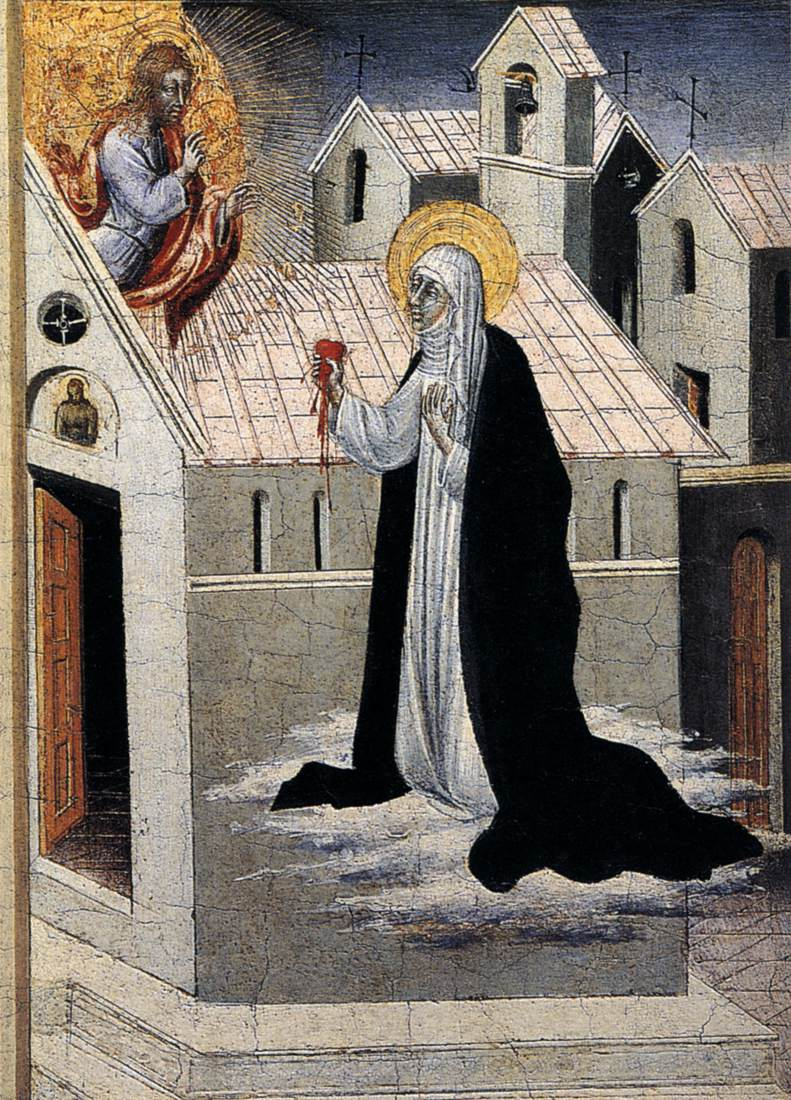
St Catherine Exchanging her Heart with Christ (ca. 1475) Tempera & gold on wood (28.6 x 22.9 cm) Private collection, New York

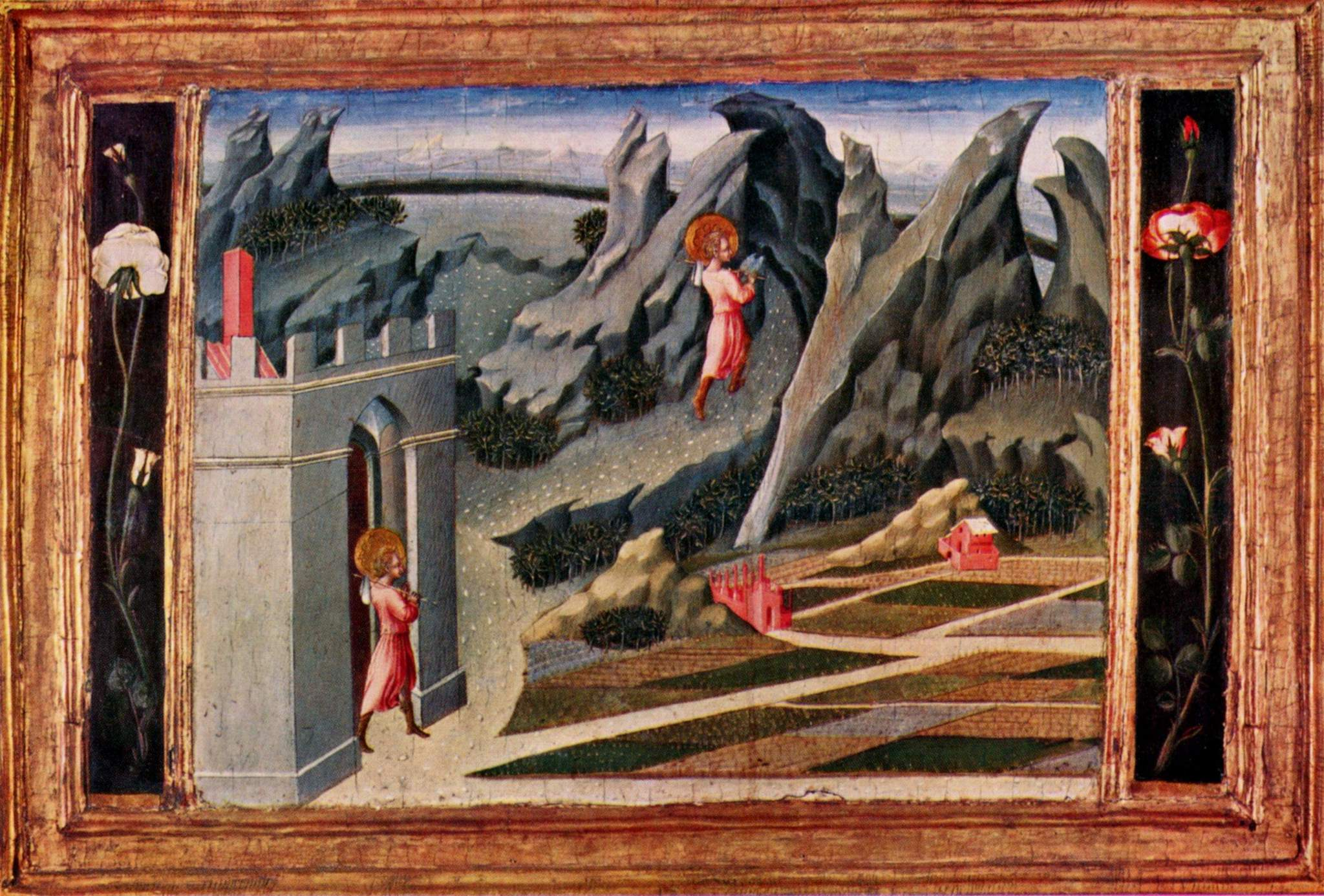
Saint John the Baptist in the Wilderness (1454) Tempera & gold on panel (31 × 39 cm) National Gallery, London

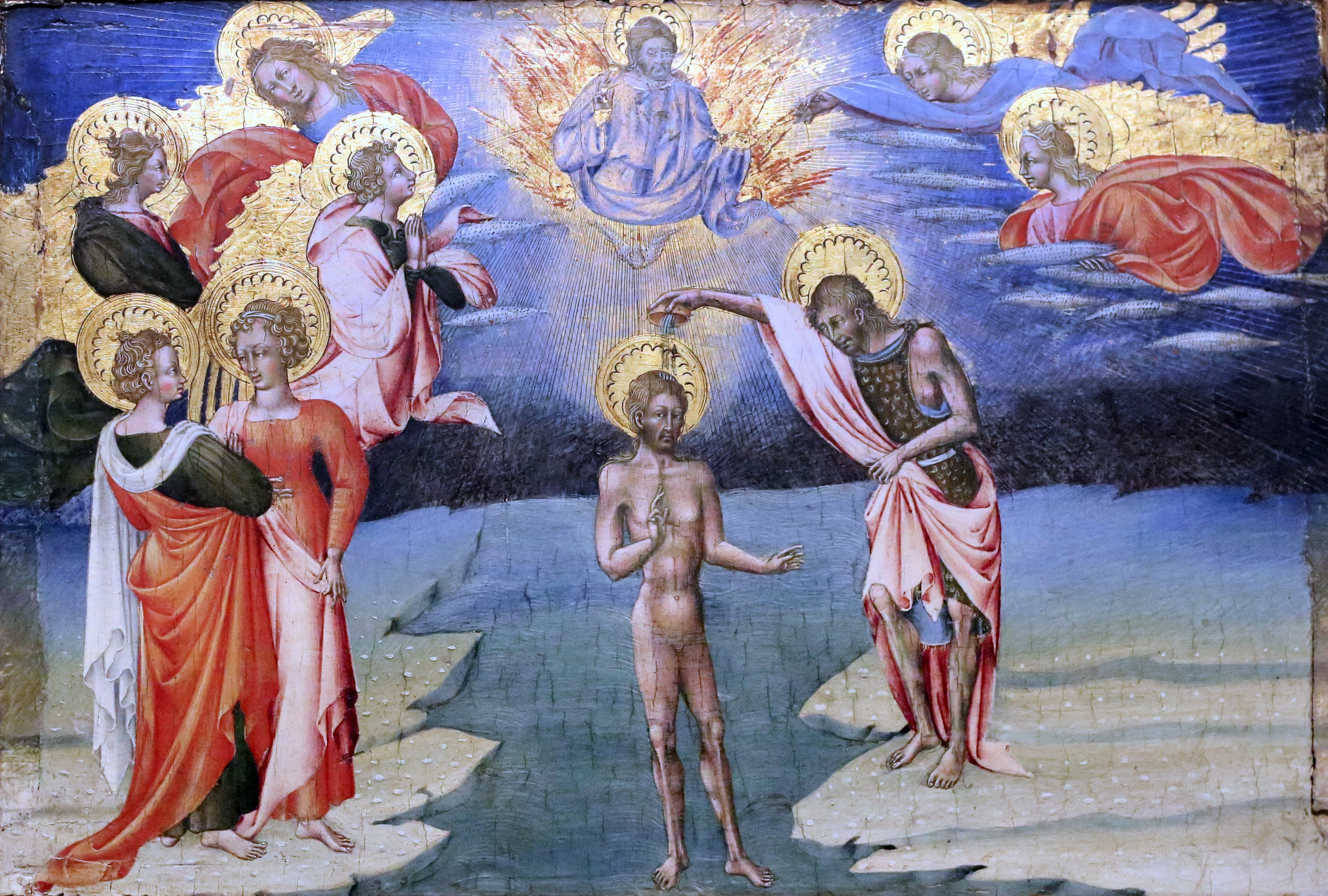
Scenes from the Life of Saint John the Baptist (1454) National Gallery, London

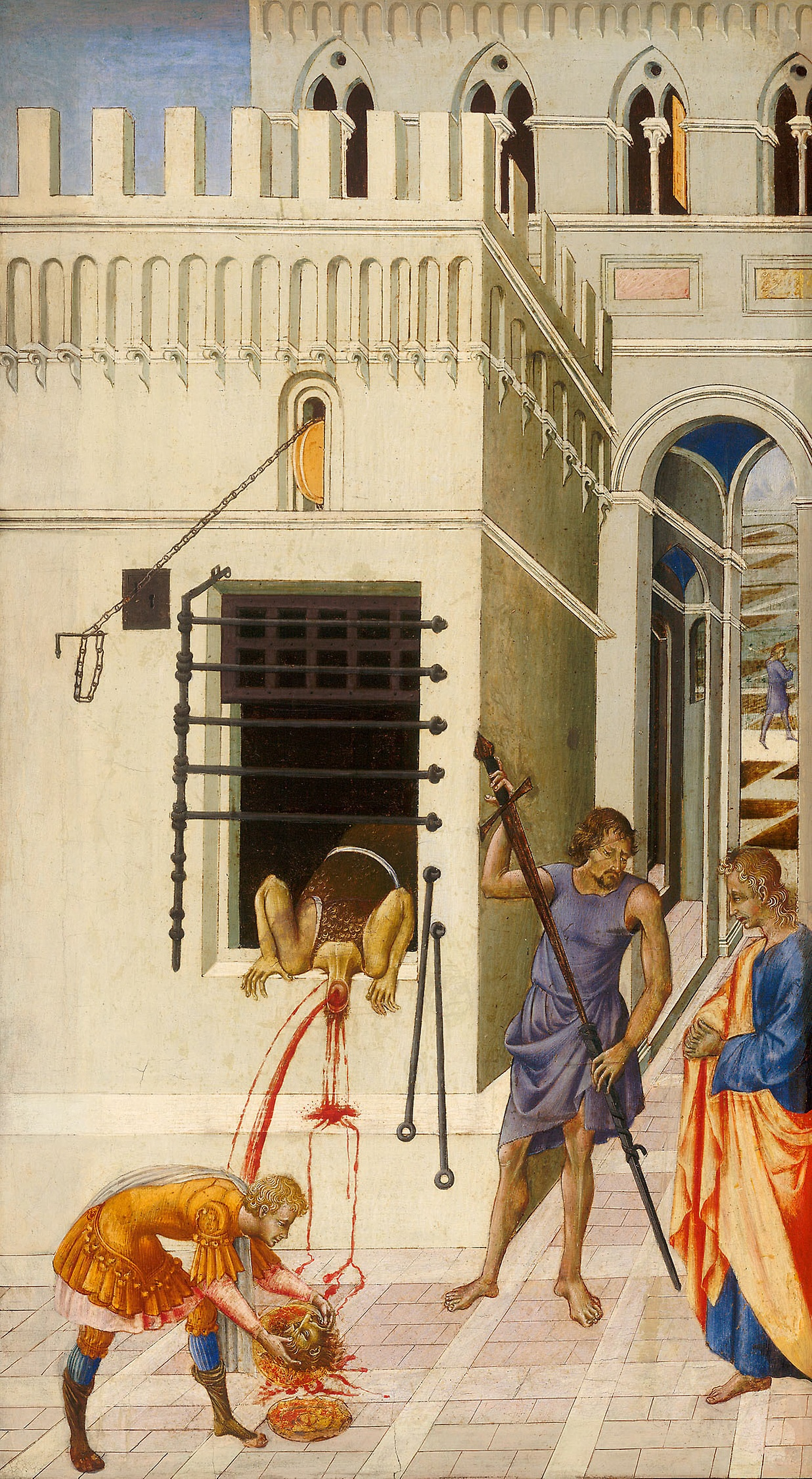
The Beheading of Saint John the Baptist (ca. 1455–60) Tempera on panel (66.3 × 36.6 cm) Art Institute of Chicago

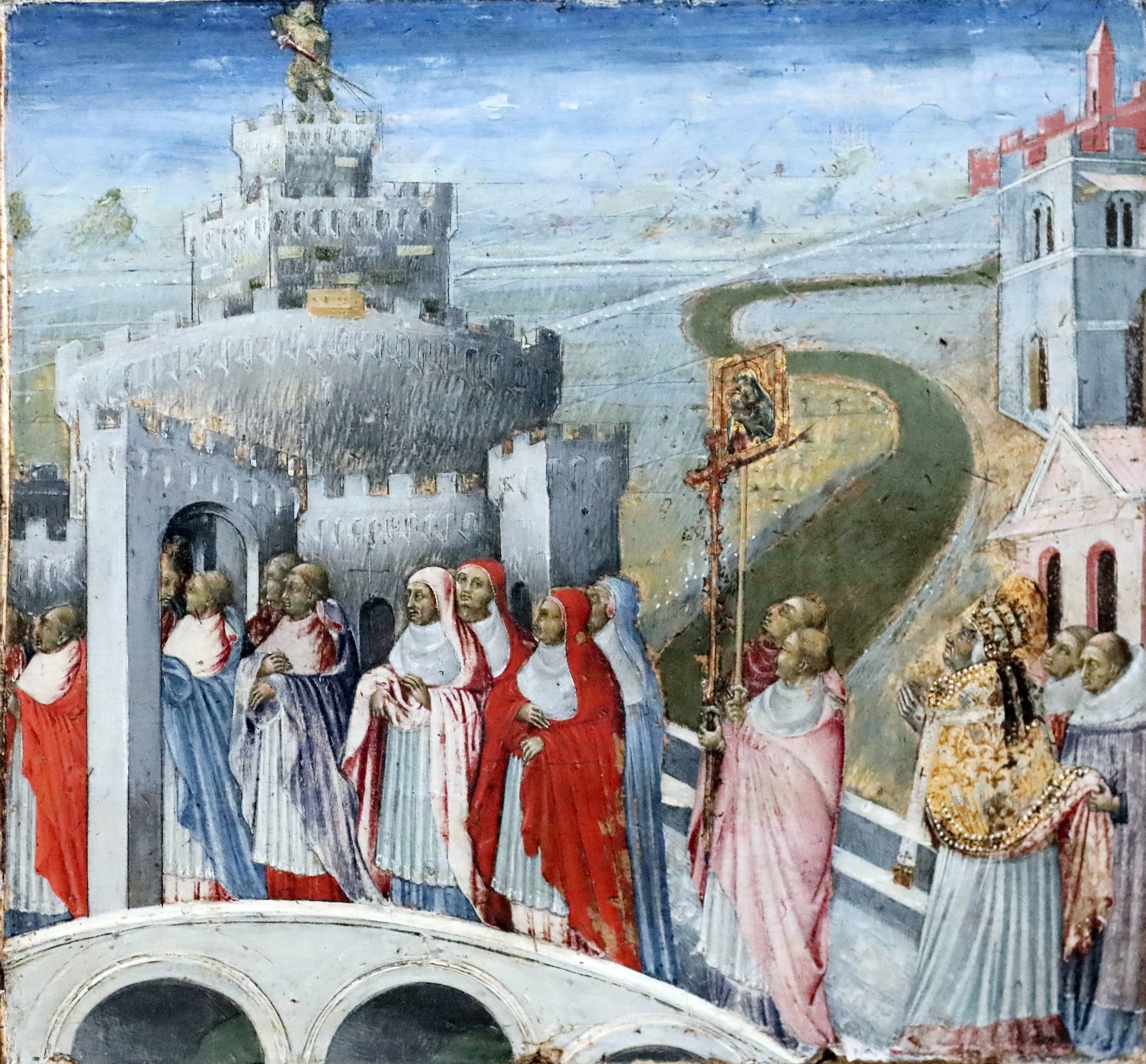
The Procession of Saint Gregory to the Castel Sant'Angelo (ca. 1470) Louvre, Paris

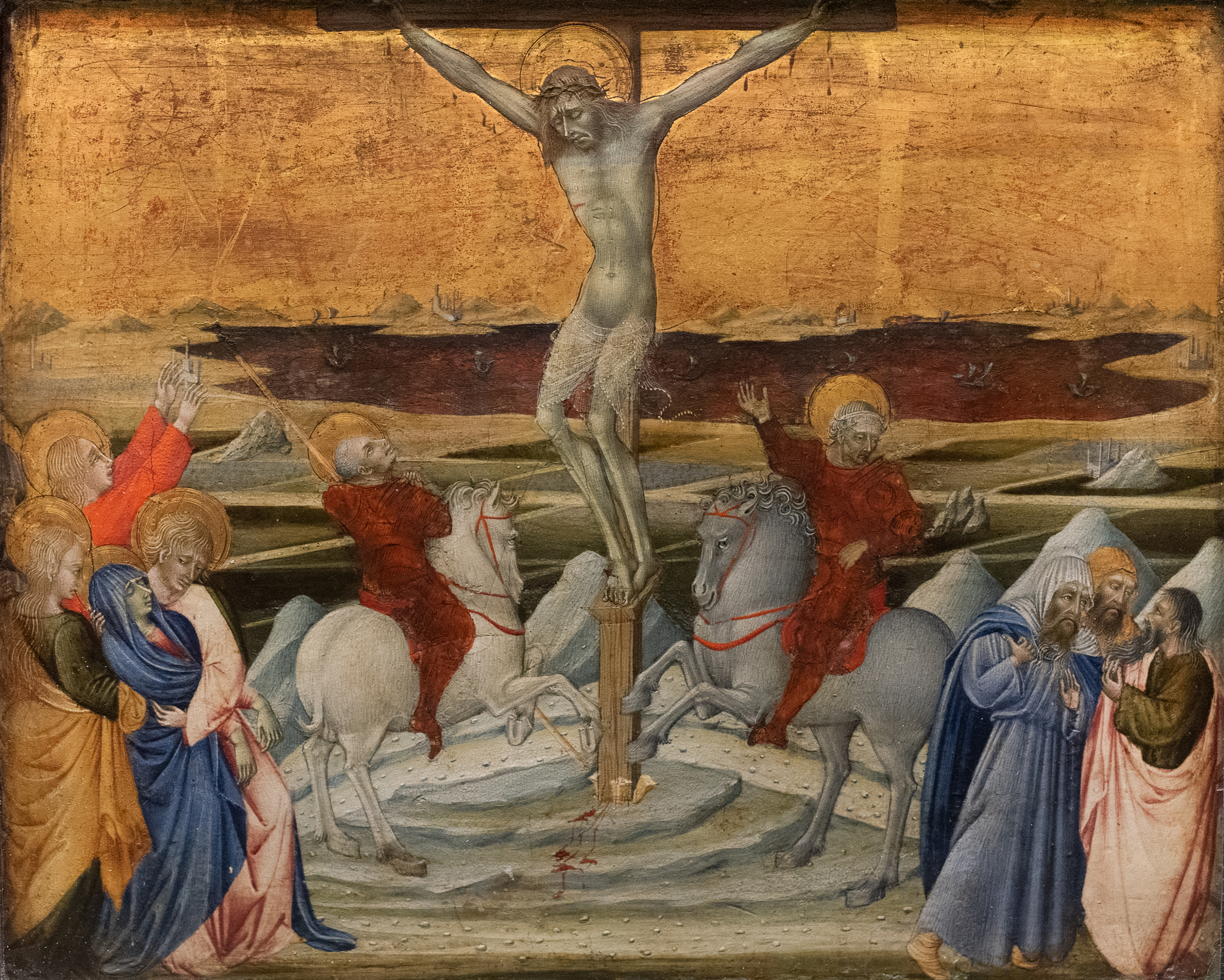
Calvary, circa 1450, Christ Church College, Oxford.

== Illuminated manuscripts ==
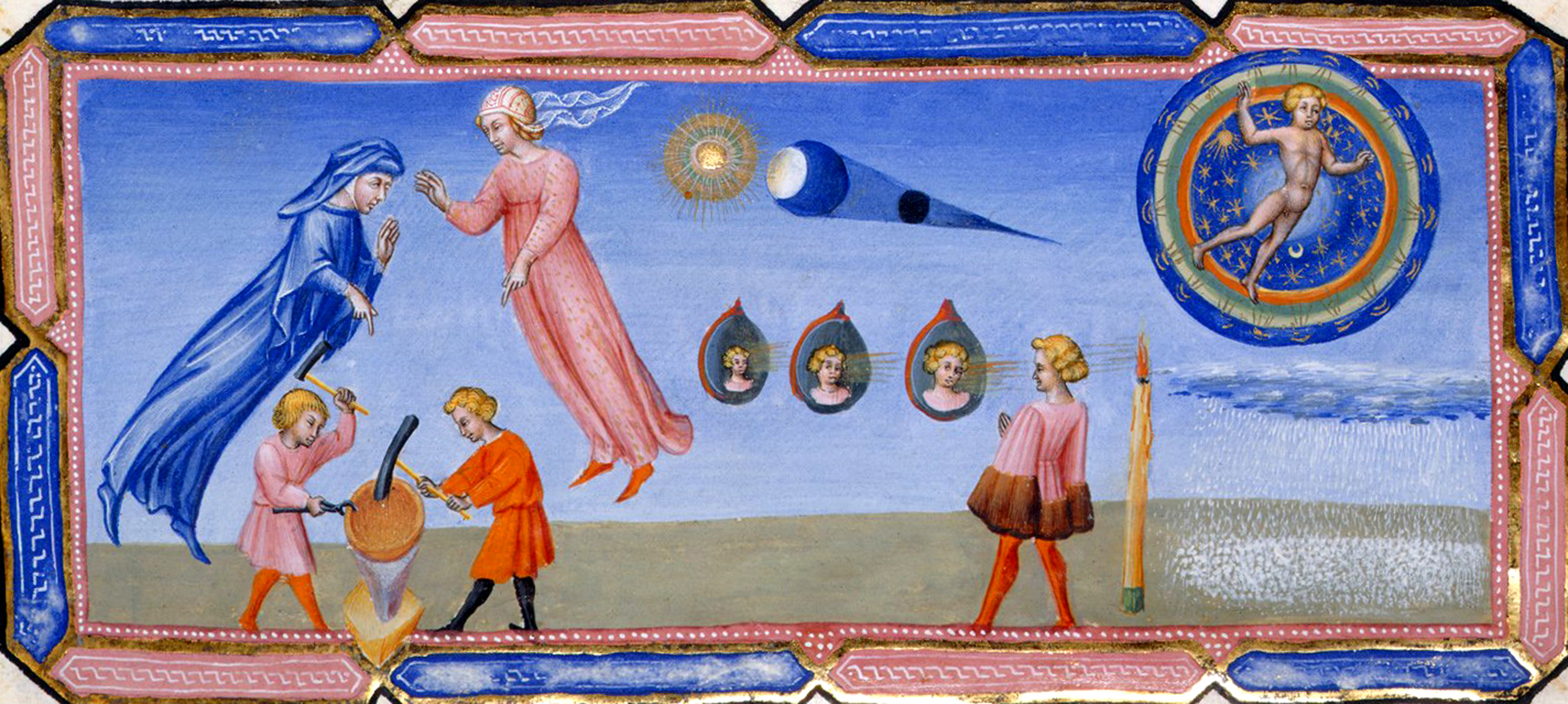
Divine Comedy, Paradiso: Beatrice explaining some scientific theories to Dante, including the appearance of the moon (1444–50) British Library

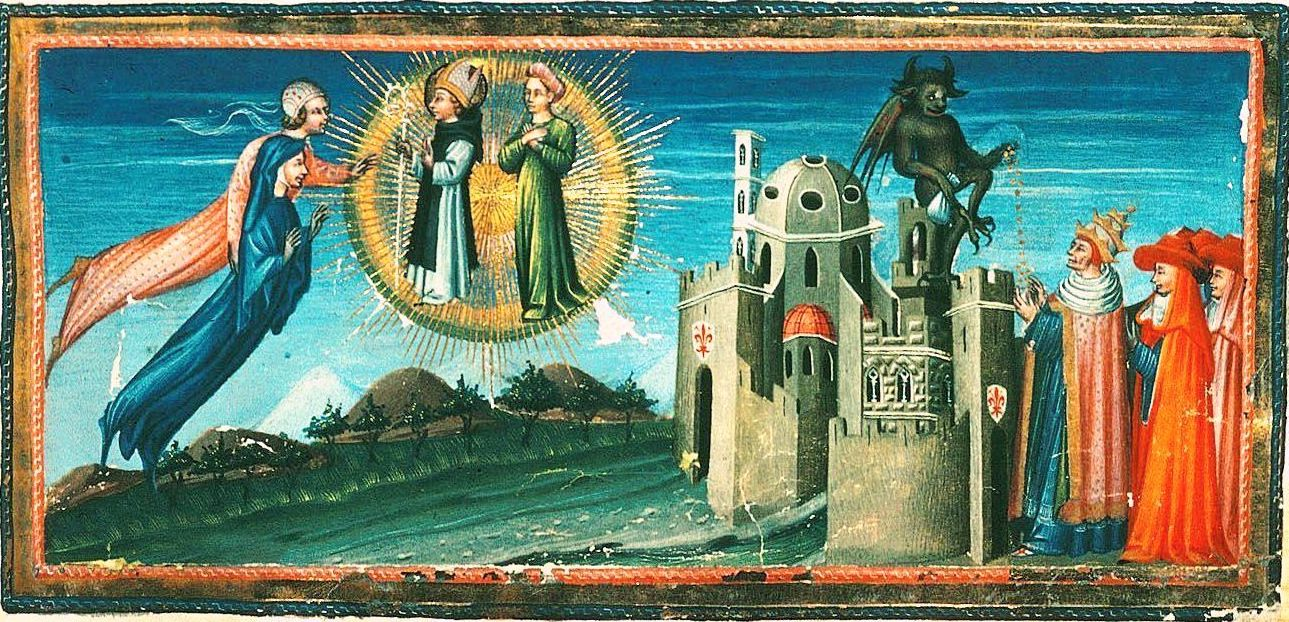
Divine Comedy, Paradiso: Dante and Beatrice meet Folco of Marseille, who denounces corrupt churchmen (1444–50) British Library

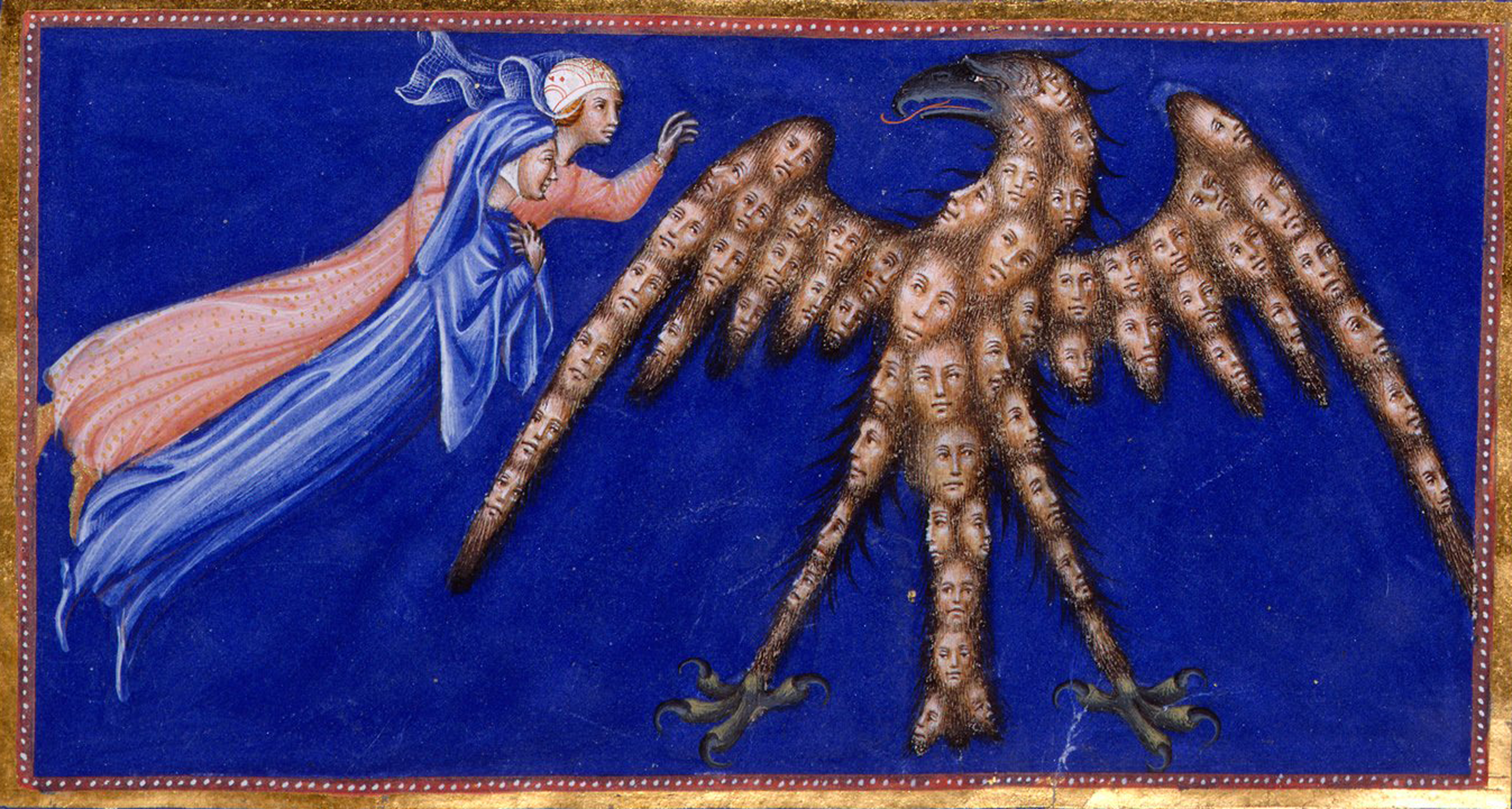
Divine Comedy, Paradiso 34: Dante and Beatrice Before the Eagle of Justice (1444–50) British Library

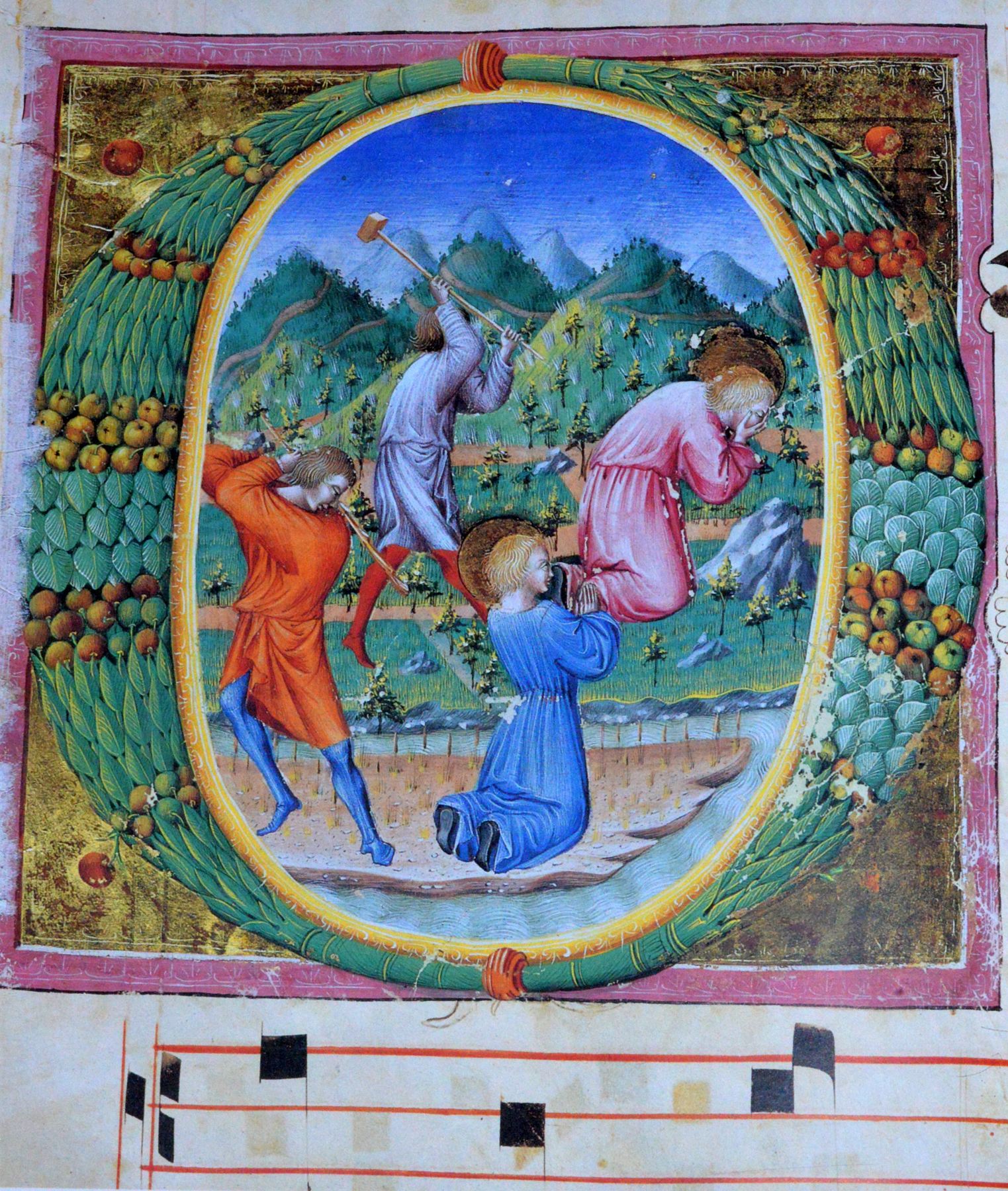
Antiphonary II: Two kneeling saints beaten to death in a landscape (ca. 1442) Tempera, gold, and ink on vellum (20.5 x 10 cm.) Biblioteca Comunale degli Intronati, Siena

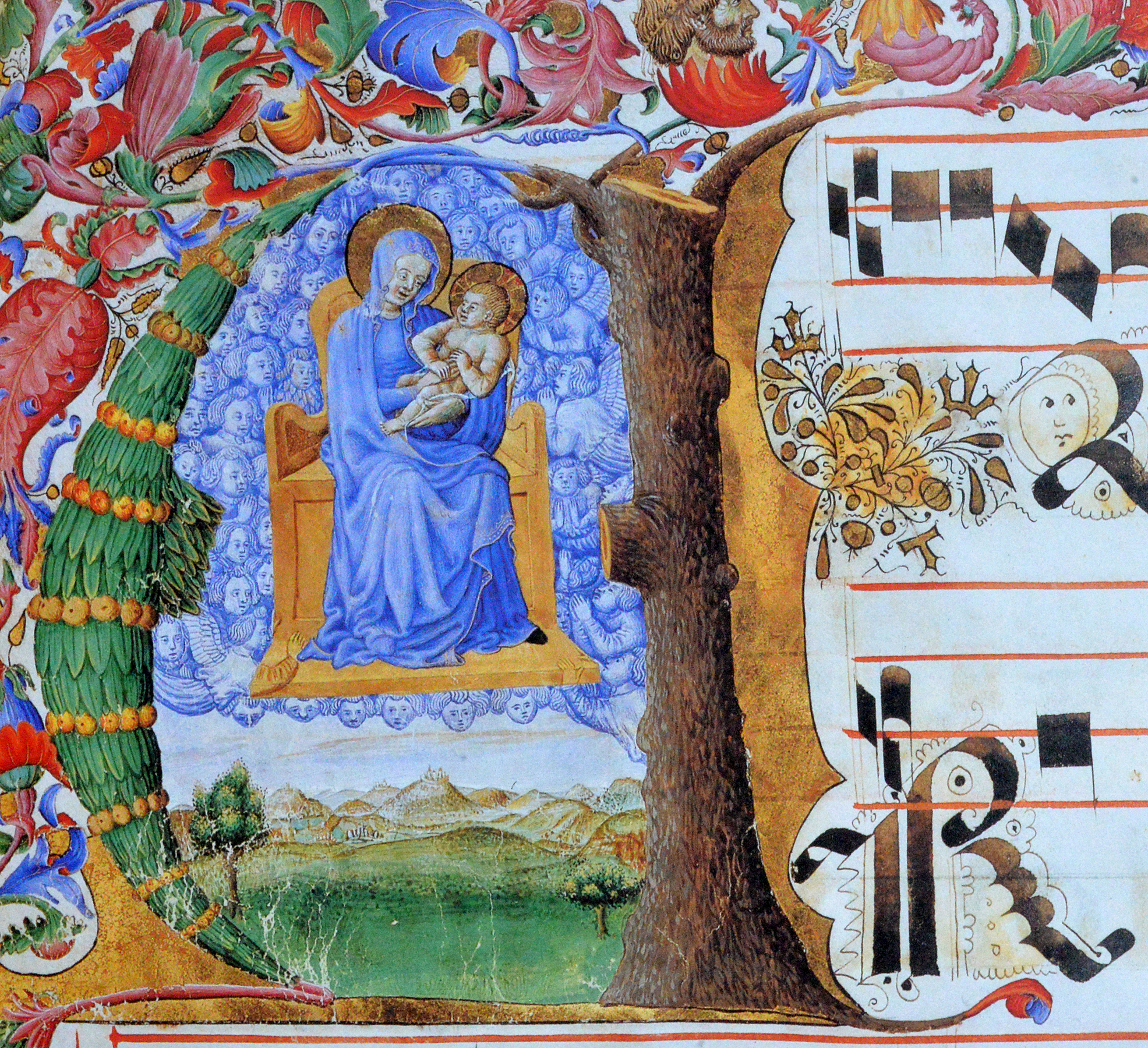
Antiphonary III; The Madonna and Child enthroned in the angelic Host (ca. 1442) Tempera, gold, and ink on vellum (15 x 14.5 cm.) Biblioteca Comunale degli Intronati, Siena

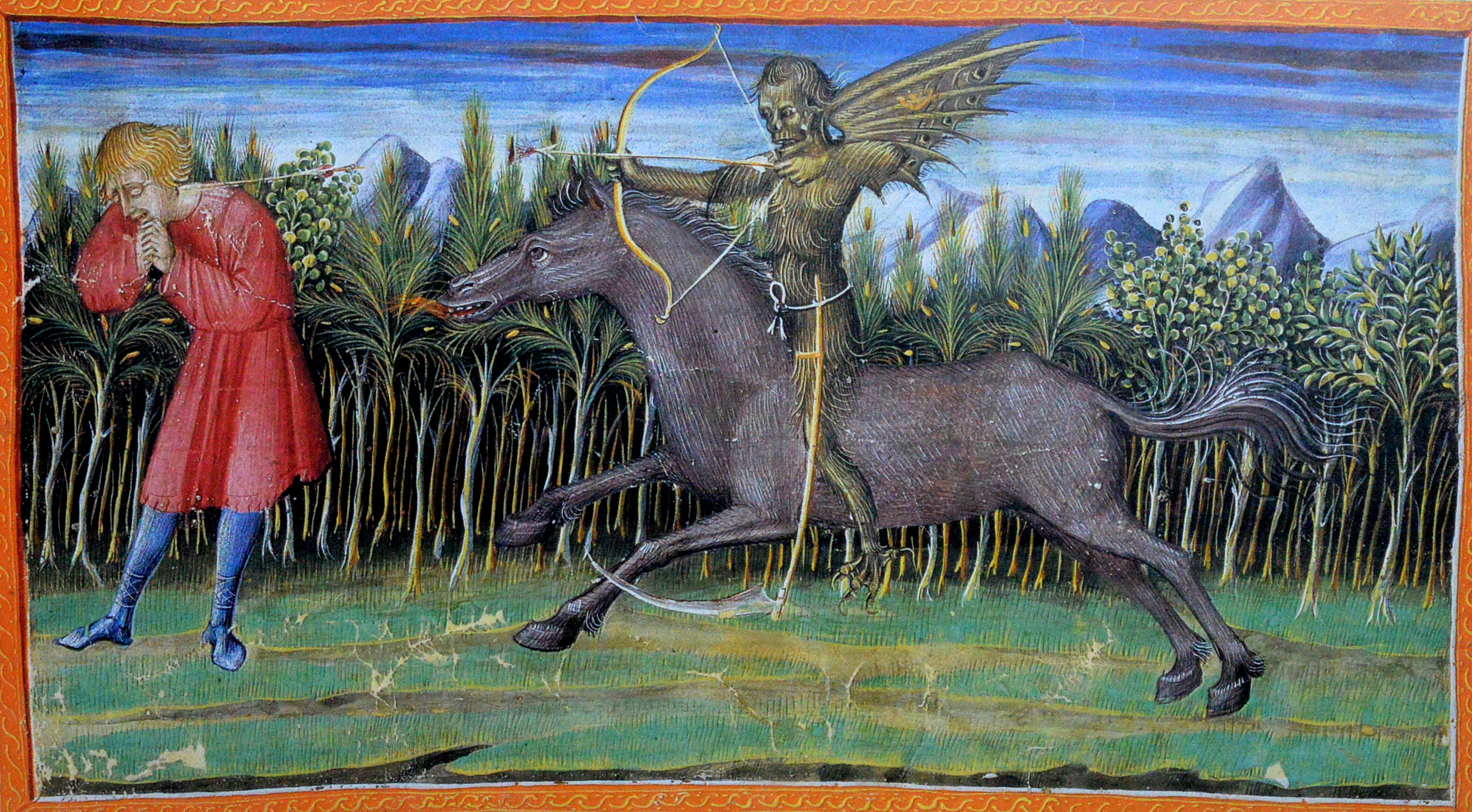
Antiphonary IV: Illustration to the Office of the Dead (ca. 1442) Tempera, gold, and ink on vellum (15 x 26.5 cm.) Biblioteca Comunale degli Intronati, Siena

== Selected works (chronological) ==
- Madonna and Child with Angels (1426)
- Saint Ansanus Baptizing (1440s). Christian Museum, Esztergom, Hungary
- Saint Michael the Archangel (1440) Pinacoteca Vaticana, Vatican City, Rome, Italy
- Madonna and Child with Two Angels and a Donor (1445). Metropolitan Museum of Art, New York, United States
- Saints Clare and Elizabeth of Hungary (1445). Private collection.
- Madonna and Child with Saints (1445). Uffizi Gallery, Florence, Italy
- Saint John The Baptist in Prison Visited by Two Disciples (1445/60). Art Institute of Chicago, United States
- Saint Stephen Suckled by a Doe (1450). San Stefano alla Lizza, Siena, Italy
- Saint John the Baptist Goes into the Wilderness (1454). Art Institute of Chicago, United States
- Saint Nicholas of Tolentino Saving a Ship (1455). Philadelphia Museum of Art, United States
- Coronation of the Virgin (1455). Metropolitan Museum of Art, New York, United States
- Nativity (1460s). Christian Museum, Esztergom, Hungary
- Saint Catherine before the Pope at Avignon (1460). Thyssen-Bornemisza Museum, Madrid, Spain
- The Adoration of the Magi (1462). Metropolitan Museum of Art, New York, United States
- The Virgin and Christ Child with Saints Bernardino, Anthony Abbot, Francis and Sabina and The Lamentation over the Dead Christ (1462–63). Pienza Cathedral, Italy
- Madona and Christ at Throne (c.1462–1465). National Museum of Serbia, Belgrade, Serbia
- Last Judgment, Heaven, and Hell (1465). Pinacoteca, Siena, Italy
- Assumption of the Virgin (1475). Pinacoteca, Siena, Italy
