= Martín Cortés =

Martín Cortés may refer to:

- Martín Cortés de Albacar (1510–1582), Spanish cosmographer
- Martín Cortés (son of Malinche) (1522–1595)
- Martín Cortés, 2nd Marqués del Valle de Oaxaca (1532–1589)
- Martín Miguel Cortés (born 1983), Argentine footballer
