= Juan Suárez de Peralta =

Spanish-Mexican historian, veterinarian, and horseman

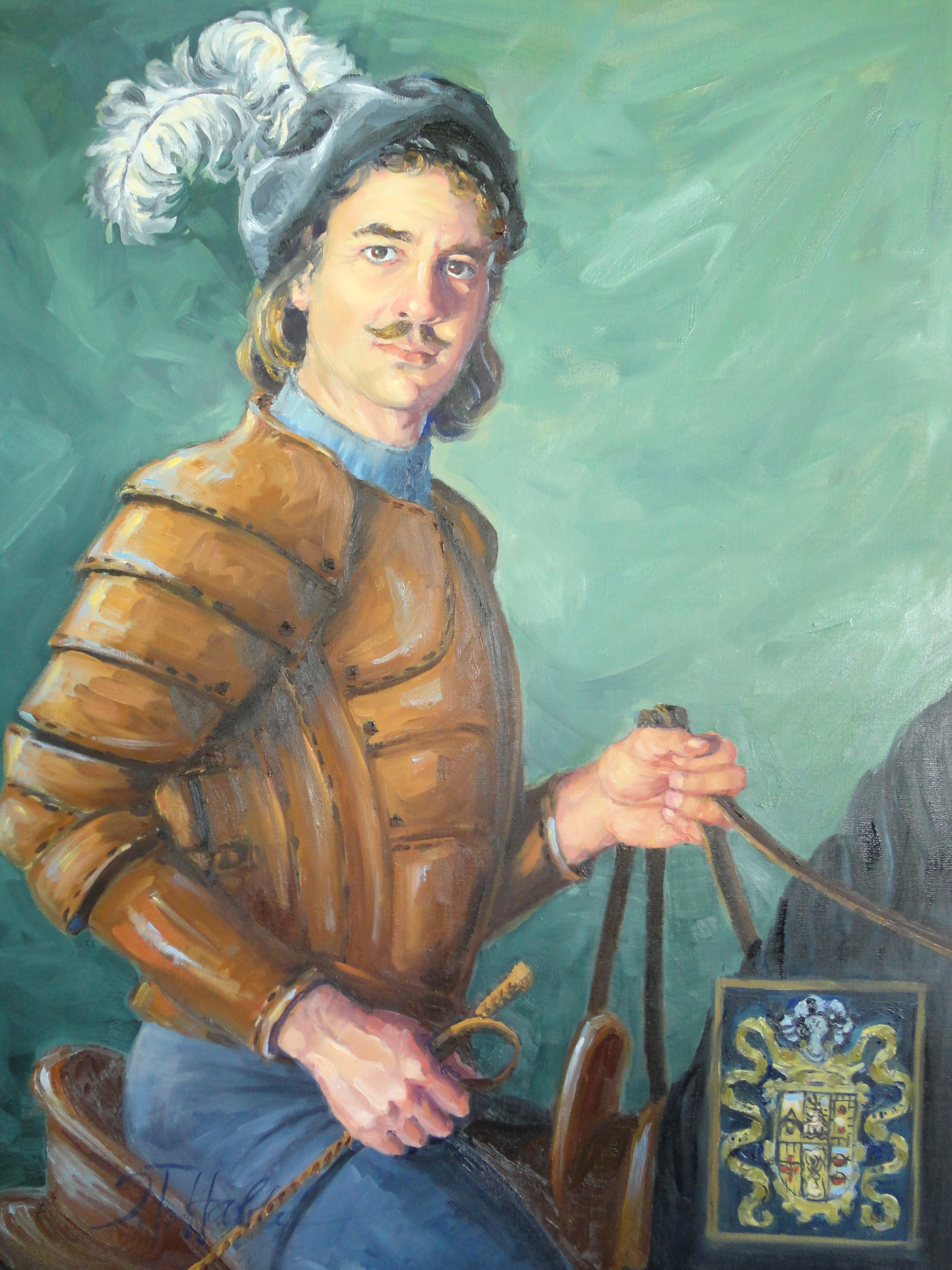
- Born: Mexico City
- Died: Madrid
- Citizenship: New Spain-Mexico
- Occupations: Historian, chronicler, writer, veterinarian, horseman
- Writing career
- Language: Spanish

Juan Suárez de Peralta (Mexico City-Tenochtitlan, New Spain, 1541-Madrid, 1613) was a Spanish-Mexican Criollo who distinguished himself for his writings on equestrian exercises and equine science, as well as life in New Spain in the 16th century. He is considered a historian for dealing with the subject of the Conquest, and one of the first scholars of albeytería, later known as veterinary medicine in the New World, for his extensive knowledge of horses.

== Biography and Family ==
Juan Suárez de Peralta (“El Cronista” or The Chronicler), was born in Mexico City-Tenochtitlan (New Spain) in 1541. He was the son of Juan Suárez Marcayda (The Conqueror, also known as “El Viejo” or The Old Man) and Magdalena Esparza. He had two siblings: Luis (older) and Catalina (younger). His brother Luis inherited the Tamazulapa encomienda that had been granted to his father.

=== Relationship with Hernán Cortés ===
Juan Suárez de Peralta’s father, Juan Suárez Marcayda “El Viejo”, was the son of Gonzalo Suárez and María Marcayda. He had two sisters: Leonor and Catalina. Juan Suárez "El Viejo" served under the orders of Hernán Cortés and was one of his trusted soldiers. His sister Catalina married Cortés in Cuba, and in this way the father of the chronicler became brother-in-law of Hernán Cortés, who became the political uncle of the chronicler.

The Suárez de Peraltas were owners of large plots of land in the indigenous neighborhood of Tacubaya, west of the city of Mexico-Tecnochtitlán. On his extensive estate he cultivated olive trees and wheat fields, and dedicated himself to breeding fine horses, learning the arts of equine medicine. The “Casa de la Bola de Tacubaya” or Ball House, was built on these lands, probably by his son Lorenzo, who incorporated the image of his father in the top of the main façade. The house is now a museum.

=== Relationship with the viceroys and the Marquisate of Valle ===
Suárez de Peralta always recognized the viceregal authority and was a loyal subject of the Spanish Crown at the same time that he was related to the Marquises of the Valley of Oaxaca through the marriage of his aunt Catalina to Hernán Cortés. Martín Cortés, son of Hernan Cortés and 2nd Marquess del Valle, was tried and exiled in 1566 (later pardoned in 1574), while his followers were beheaded, for conspiring to overthrow the Spanish Crown seeking greater autonomy for New Spain.

In the —Tratado del Descubrimiento de las Indias (Treaty of the Discovery of the Indies and their Conquest), one can infer the neutral position of Juan Suárez de Peralta between the viceregal authority and the Marquisate of the Valley. The author gives an account of the conquest and ends by focusing on daily life in New Spain. He devotes extensive pages to the dispute between Martín Cortés and the Royal Court, which he governed as regent after the death of Viceroy Luis de Velasco I.

The beheading of the followers of Martín Cortés are narrated with a dramatic tone and sorrow: “... I saw him on the aforementioned scaffold and then his head on the pillory, with a long nail driven through the crown of his head and driven through that precious helmet, piercing his brains and delicate flesh... I felt the need to stop my horse, passing through the square where the gallows were and where the heads of these gentlemen were, and I had to look at them with so many tears in my eyes that I don't know if I had ever cried so much in my life...” but never with opinions against the authority of the Spanish Crown and its representatives in the viceroyalty.

The reason he wrote the —Treatise on the Discovery of the Indies and its Conquest— was to justify himself as a spectator of the rebellion of Martín Cortés and its consequences. In it, his position as not involved and always faithful to the Crown is highlighted, although he is pained by the death of Martín Cortés' knights.

In his writings, one can perceive the chronicler's point of view on the Viceroys of New Spain that he knew. He spoke highly of the first viceroy Antonio de Mendoza, of whom he says that the population of New Spain came to see as a father. He also dedicates several pages to the Viceroy Luis de Velasco praising his equestrian skills and his love of parties. Furthermore, the viceroy Gastón de Peralta, Marquess of Falces, is described as having arrived in New Spain during the dispute between the Royal Court and the Marquisate of the Valley. Gastón de Peralta made the mistake of befriending Martín Cortés, thus turning the judges of the Royal Court against him. In this way, they finally got the King to order his return to Spain to replace him with another viceroy.

=== Marriage and descendants ===
Juan Suárez de Peralta married (date unknown) Ana de Cervantes, although this union did not last long as in 1579 he travelled to Spain as a widower. According to research, he remarried around 1600 to a lady of the Madrid aristocracy called Isabel Hurtado de Mendoza, who was related to the House of Infantado of Mendoza. In 1601 his son Lorenzo Suárez de Peralta was born. According to the research of Professor Miguel Ángel Márquez, it is shown that the chronicler died on January 8, 1613 at the age of 72. His burial took place in the Church of the Holy Spirit of the Minor Clerics in Madrid, according to the archives of the Parish of San Sebastián on Atocha Street, in Madrid. At the time of his death, his wife was 7 months pregnant. Furthermore, it was discovered that his son Lorenzo obtained permission from King Philip III to travel to the Indies on June 7, 1619 to claim the inheritance of his grandfather, uncle and father for the amount of 500 pesos.

== Works ==
Juan Suárez de Peralta, in addition to being a chronicler and historian, was an “hombre de á caballo”, an accomplished horseman and rider. He dedicated himself to breeding fine horses in Tacubaya (Mexico City), where he acquired practical knowledge of equine medicine and zootechnics. This made him the “Protoalbéitar of America”, that is, the first veterinarian born on the American Continent.

He wrote various works: In 1580, he published in Seville —Tratado de la Jineta y de la Brida (Treatise on Jineta and Brida Horsemanship), where he describes the most common forms of riding in Spain and New Spain. It was the first treatise published by a native of the Americas on a secular subject. The —Tratado del Descubrimiento de las Indias (Treaty of the Discovery of the Indies and their Conquest)— in 1589, was written during his stay at the court in Madrid, in which he reviews the history of the founding of New Spain and recounts events of daily life, the origin of the Indians until the arrival of the viceroy Don Antonio de Mendoza, in 1535. That same year he published —La Conspiración de Martin Cortés (The Conspiracy of Martín Cortés)—, which deals with what happened to Martín Cortés, 2nd Marquess of the Valley, after the death of the viceroy Luis de Velasco y Ruiz de Alarcón, when he clashed with the Royal Court.

The book —Libro de Albeyiteria (Veterinary Medicine)- written in Mexico City around 1575, only saw the light of day until 1953, when it was published in Mexico City, on the occasion of the commemoration of the 100th anniversary of the founding of the former School of Veterinary Medicine of San Jacinto, Tacuba, Mexico City (1853) and the 400 years of the founding of the Royal and Pontifical University of Mexico (1553). The book is known for having the first description of a rodeo or roundup.
