= Marquesado del Valle Codex =

The Marquesado del Valle Codex is a manuscript written in the Nahuatl language on amate paper, by indigenous writers (tlacuilos) during second half of the 16th century. It contains 28 petitions by landowners from the Marquesado del Valle area of Mexico, located in today's states of Morelos, Puebla, Oaxaca, and Mexico, requesting return of their lands. The lands and sugar mills of this region were seized by explorer Hernán Cortés when he became the first marquess. The manuscript, which consists of Nahuatl language text, glyphs, and maps, provides detailed information about local land ownership, agriculture, leaders, and place names. It is held by the Archivo General de la Nación de México.

A similar document, the "Atatepec Land Claim [Petition to recover a tract of land from the marques]," describing litigation against Martín Cortés, 2nd Marquis of the Valley of Oaxaca, is held by the Latin American Library at Tulane University.
