= Vaquero =

Horse-mounted livestock herder

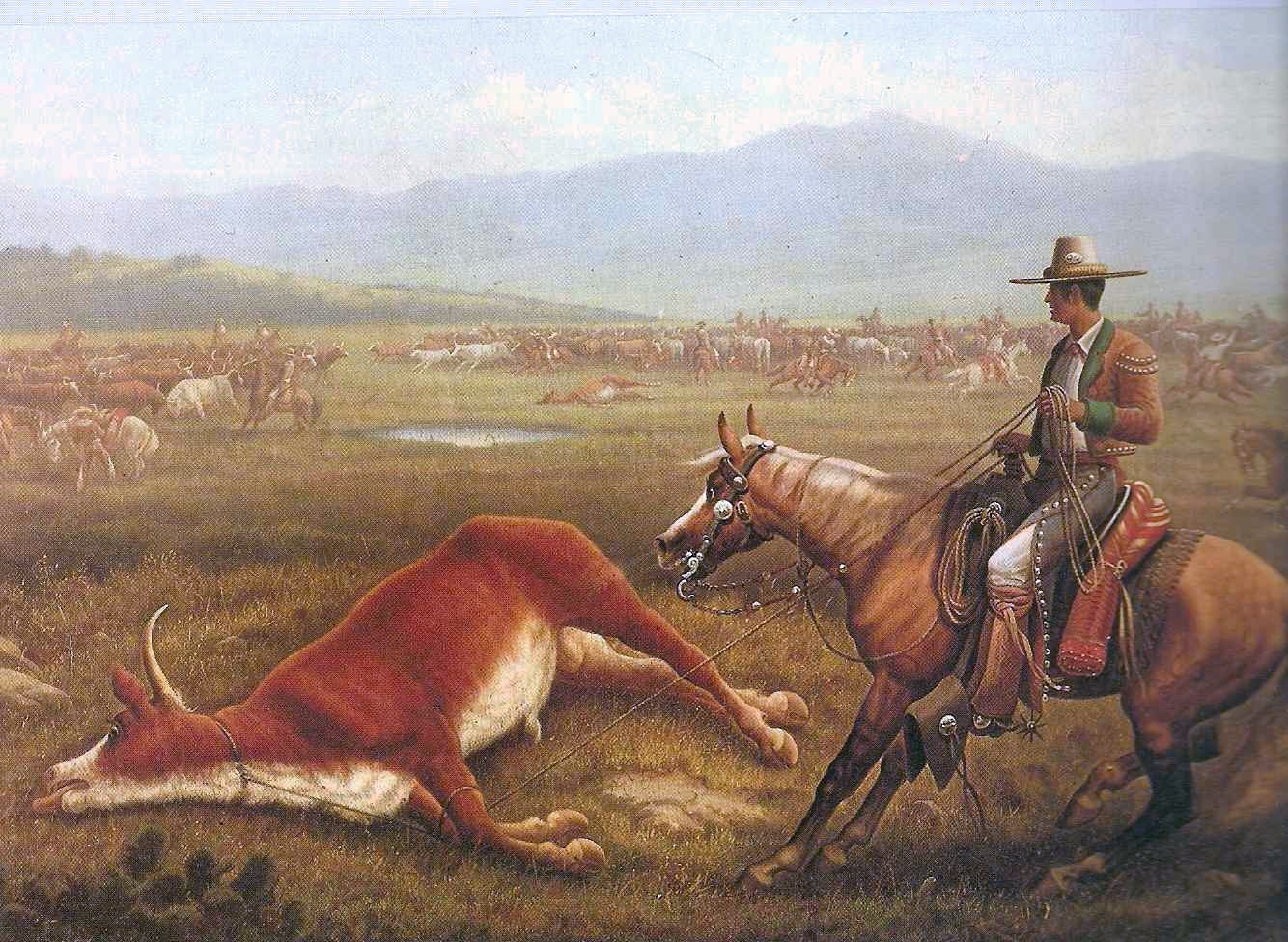
Vaquero (1877)

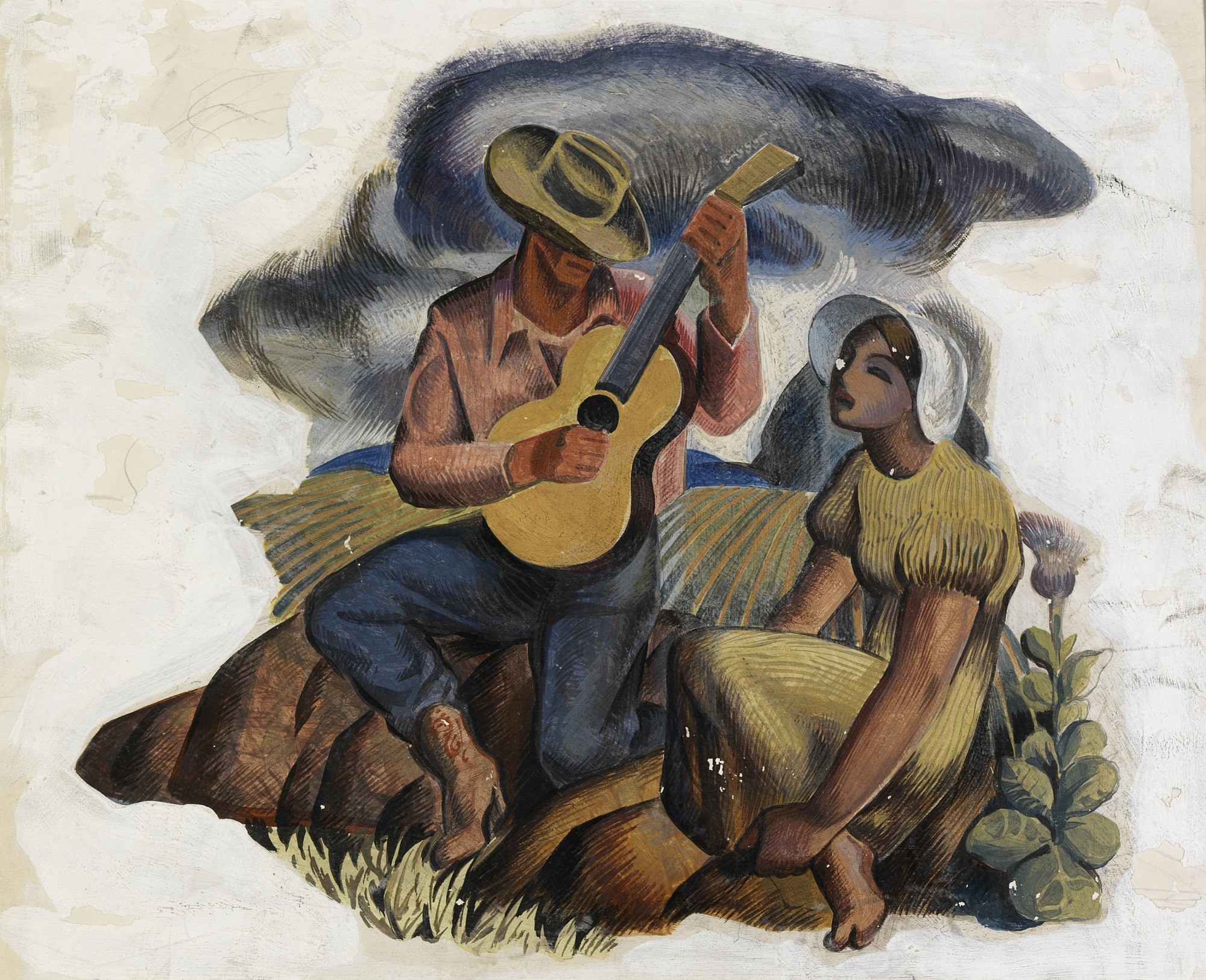
Music of the Plains (mural study, Kilgore, Texas, 1939) by Xavier Gonzalez. This New Deal-era artwork features a vaquero serenading a woman, symbolizing the deep Hispanic cultural roots in Kilgore's identity. The original study is housed in the Smithsonian American Art Museum.

The vaquero (Spanish: [baˈkeɾo]; Portuguese: vaqueiro, European Portuguese: [vɐˈkɐjɾu]) is a horse-mounted livestock herder of a tradition that has its roots in the Iberian Peninsula, and extensively developed in what is today Mexico (then New Spain) from methods brought to the Americas from Spain. The vaquero became the foundation for the North American cowboy, in Northern Mexico, Southwestern United States, Florida and Western Canada.

The cowboys of the Great Basin still use the term "buckaroo", which may be a corruption of vaquero, to describe themselves and their tradition. Many in Llano Estacado and along the southern Rio Grande prefer the term vaquero, while the indigenous and Hispanic communities in the age-old Nuevo México and New Mexico Territory regions use the term caballero. Vaquero heritage remains in the culture of Mexico (Especially in Northern Mexico), along with the Californio (California), Neomexicano (New Mexico), Tejano (Texas), Central, and South America, as well as other places where there are related traditions.

== Etymology ==
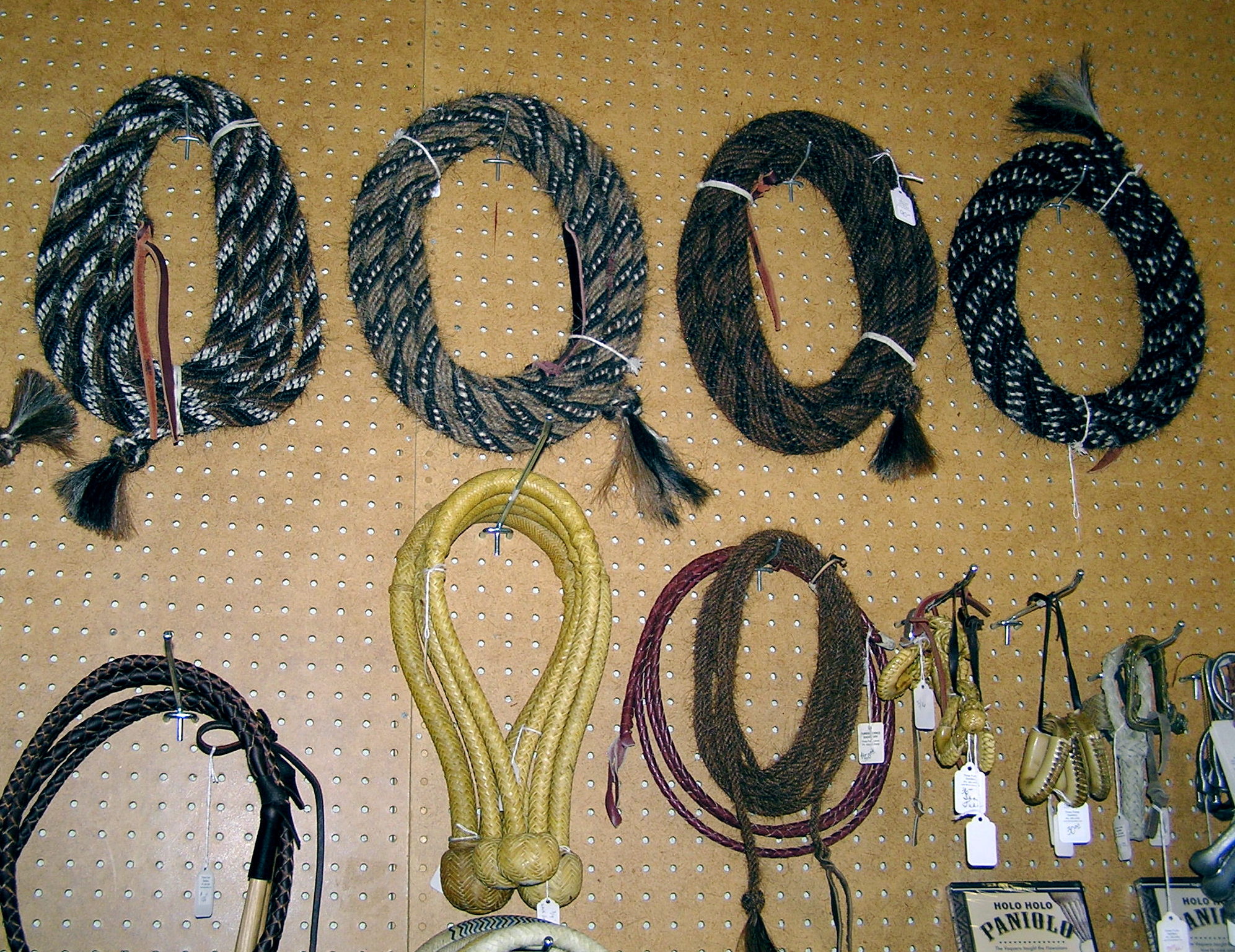
Classic vaquero-style hackamore equipment. Horsehair mecates top row, rawhide bosals in second row with other equipment

Vaquero is the Spanish word for cowherd or cattle-herder, from vaca, meaning 'cow', and the suffix -ero used in nouns to indicate a trade, job, occupation, profession or position. It derived from the Medieval Latin: vaccārius, which means cowherd, from vacca, meaning “cow”, and the suffix -ārius used to form nouns denoting an agent of use, such as a dealer or artisan, from other nouns.

A related term, buckaroo, still is used to refer to a certain style of cowboys and horsemanship most often seen in the Great Basin region of the United States that closely retains characteristics of the traditional vaquero. The word buckaroo is generally believed to be an anglicized version of vaquero and shows phonological characteristics compatible with that origin. Buckaroo first appeared in American English in 1827. The word may also have developed with influences from the English word "buck" or bucking, the behavior of young, untrained horses.

== History ==
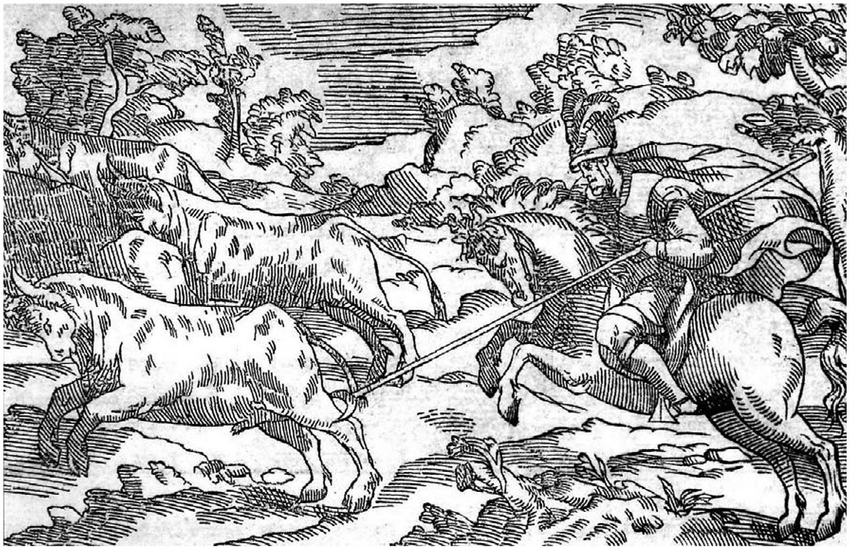
Cacería del Toro Cimarron (Hunting Wild Bulls in Colonial Mexico, 1582)

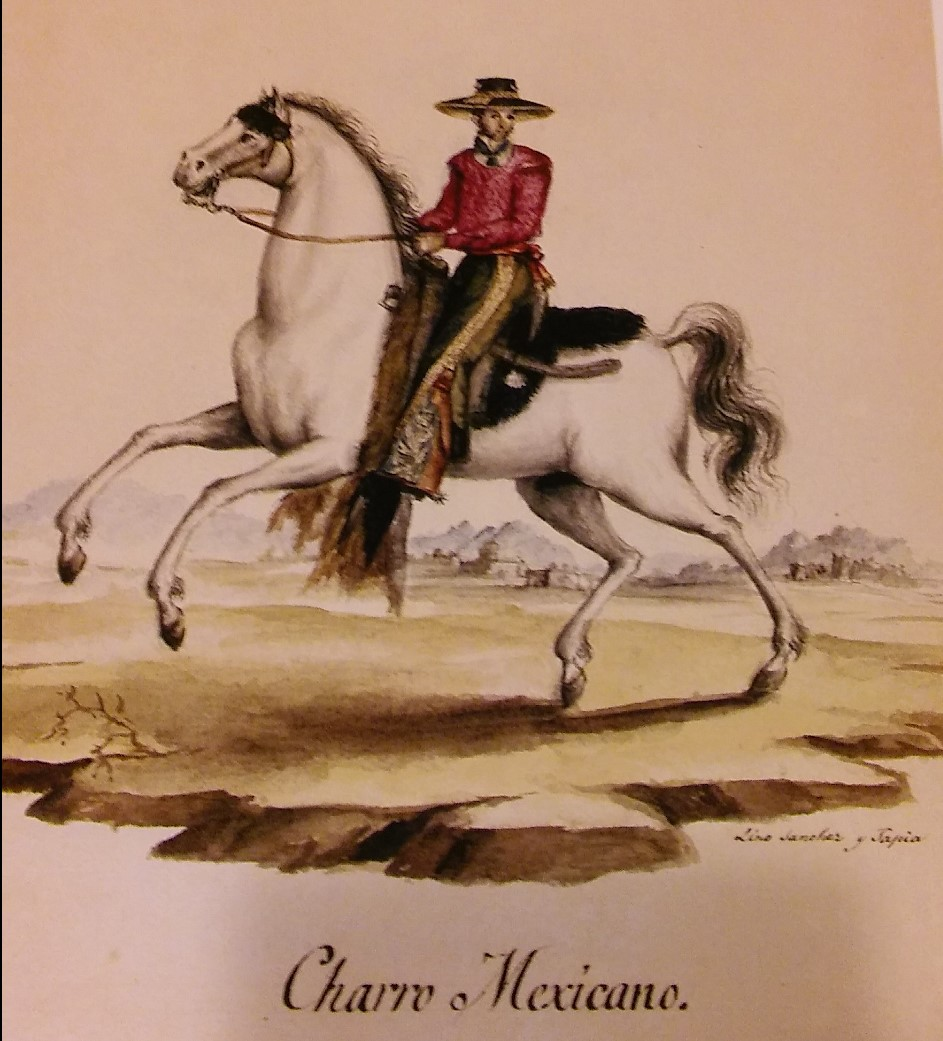
"Charro Mexicano", 1828. The term charro was originally a derogatory term or nickname for Mexican Rancheros; synonymous with the English terms 'hick', 'country bumpkin', or 'yokel'.

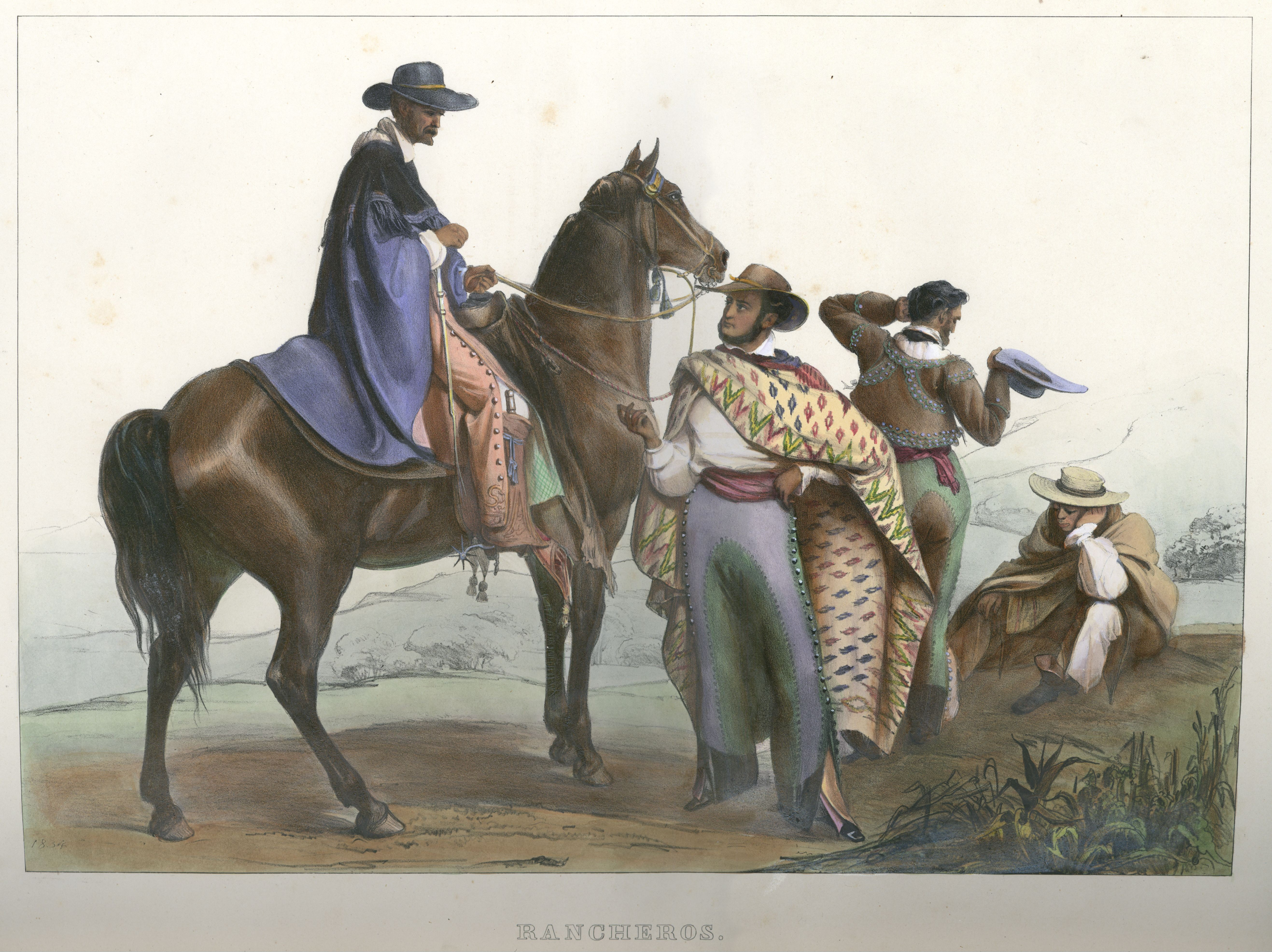
"Rancheros", from Voyage pittoresque et archéologique dans la partie la plus intéressante du Mexique, by Carl Nebel 1834

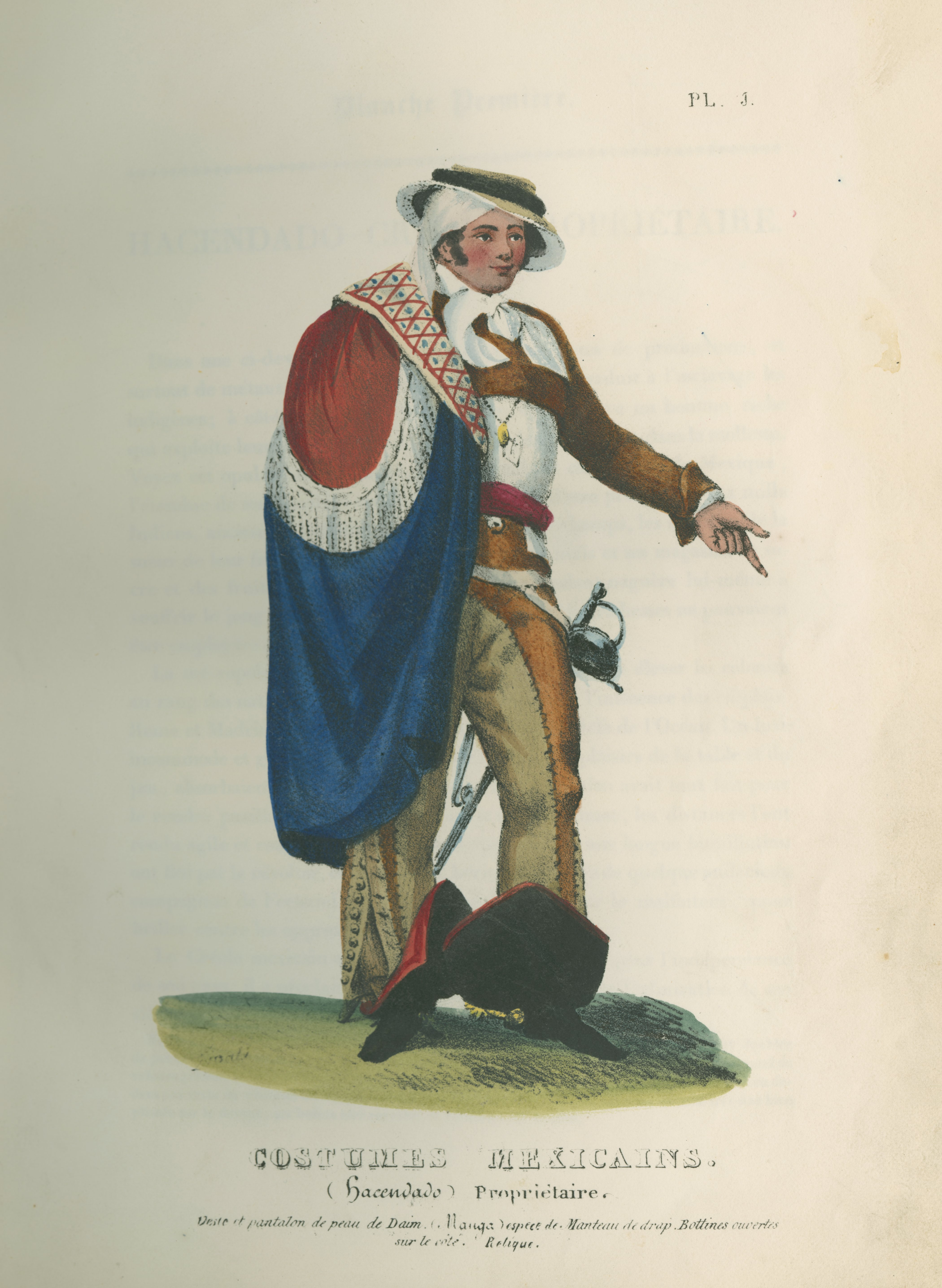
Mexican hacendado (1828). Most hacendados, or cattle estate owners, were criollos, while the vaqueros (ranch hands) were mostly members of the castas (mixed race people).

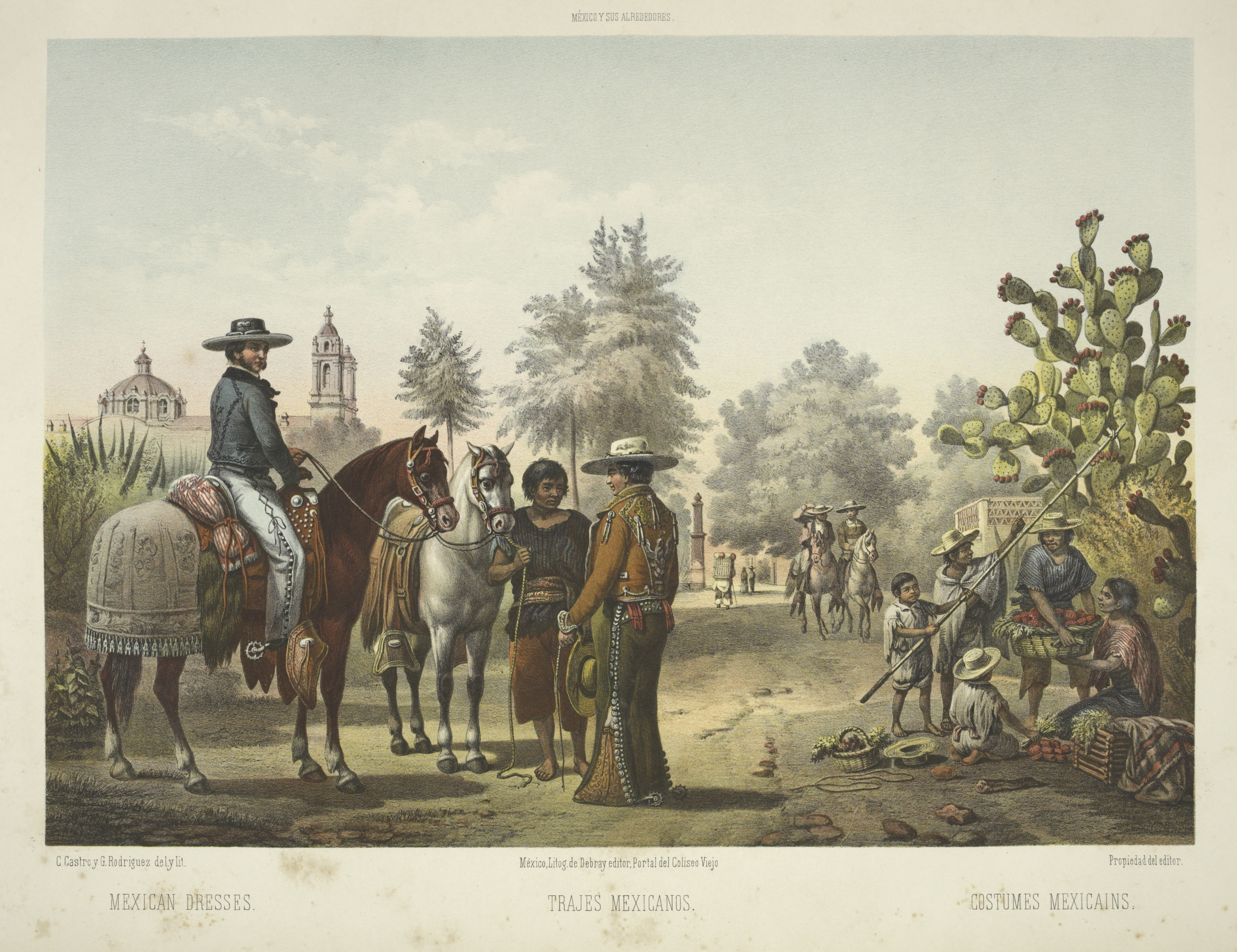
Mexican rancheros (1856)

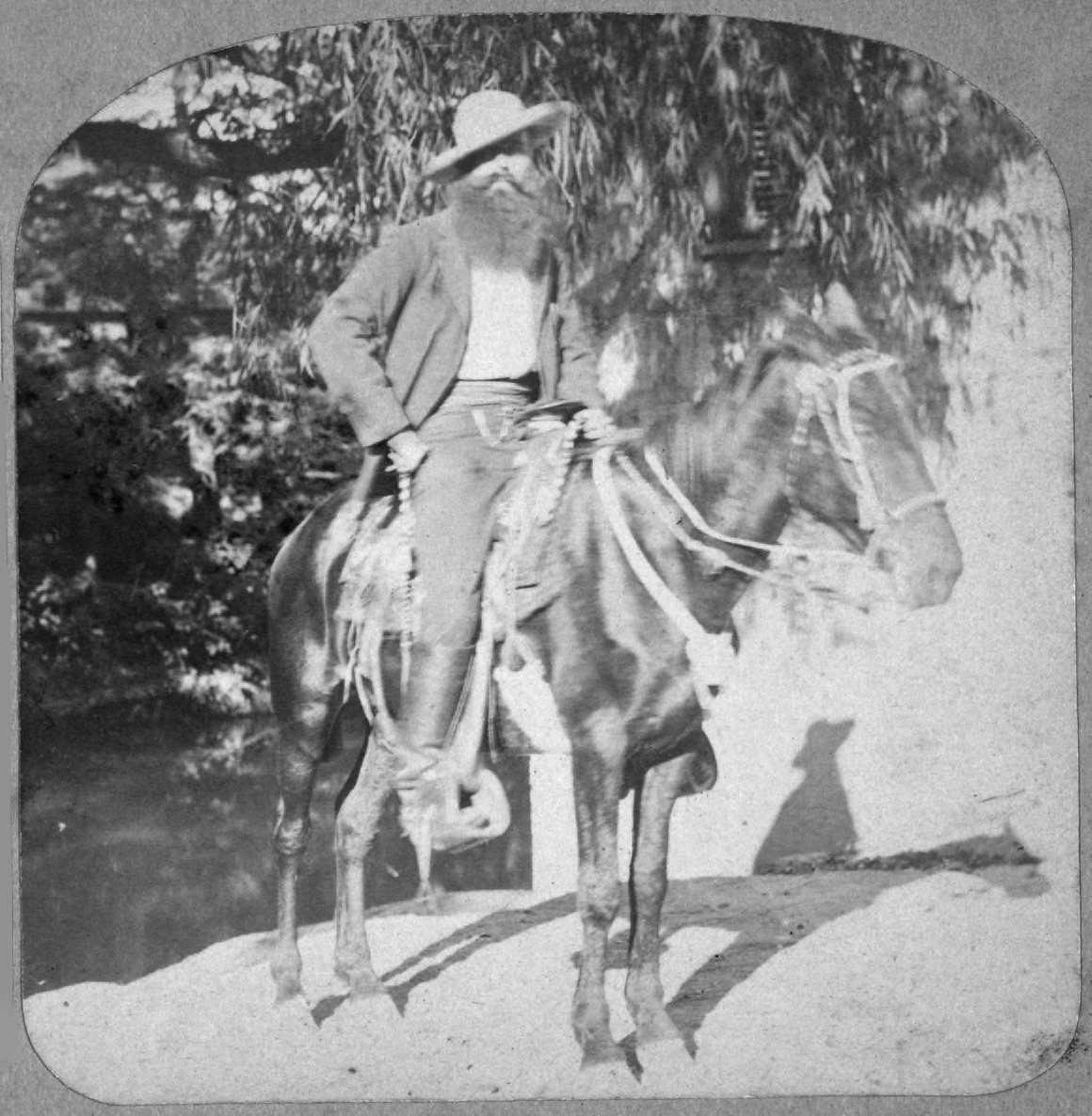
Image of a man and horse in Mexican-style equipment, horse in a two-rein bridle

The origins of the vaquero tradition come from Spain and developed extensively in what today is Mexico and the United states, beginning with the hacienda system of New Spain. This style of cattle ranching spread throughout much of the Iberian Peninsula, and it was later brought to the Americas. Both regions possessed a dry climate with sparse grass, and thus large herds of cattle required vast amounts of land to obtain sufficient forage. The need to cover distances greater than a person on foot could manage gave rise to the development of the horseback-mounted vaquero.

=== Arrival in the Americas ===
During the 16th century, the Conquistadors, and other Spanish settlers brought their cattle-raising traditions as well as both horses and domesticated cattle to the Americas Mexico (then New Spain) and Central America. The traditions of Spain were transformed by the geographic, environmental and cultural circumstances of New Spain, which later became Mexico and later the Southwestern United States. They also developed this culture in all of western Latin America, originating the gauchos in Argentina, the Huaso in Chile, vaquero in Mexico, and Morochuco in Peru. In turn, the land and people of the Americas also saw dramatic changes due to Spanish influence.

The arrival of horses in the Americas had profound consequences; equines had been extinct in the Americas since the end of the prehistoric ice age. Horses quickly multiplied in the Americas and became crucial to the success of the Spanish and later settlers from other nations. In Libro de Albeyteria (1580), the Spanish-Mexican horseman and veterinarian, Don Juan Suárez de Peralta, asserted that horses were so abundant they "roamed wild in the countryside, without an owner" and that there were "horses and mares that are over twenty years old, and they die of old age without ever seeing man."

The earliest horses were originally of Spanish, Barb and Arabian ancestry, but a number of uniquely American horse breeds developed in North and South America through selective breeding and by natural selection of animals that escaped to the wild and became feral. Spanish army Captain, Bernardo Vargas Machuca, wrote in 1599, that the best and finest horses were the Mexican ones, stating that they were “light and marvelously fast, they rein well and respond to punishment, without bad habits like those from here in Spain, and they breed better and stronger hooves.”

The mustang and other colonial horse breeds are now called "wild", but in reality are feral horses—descendants of domesticated animals.

=== 16th to 19th centuries ===
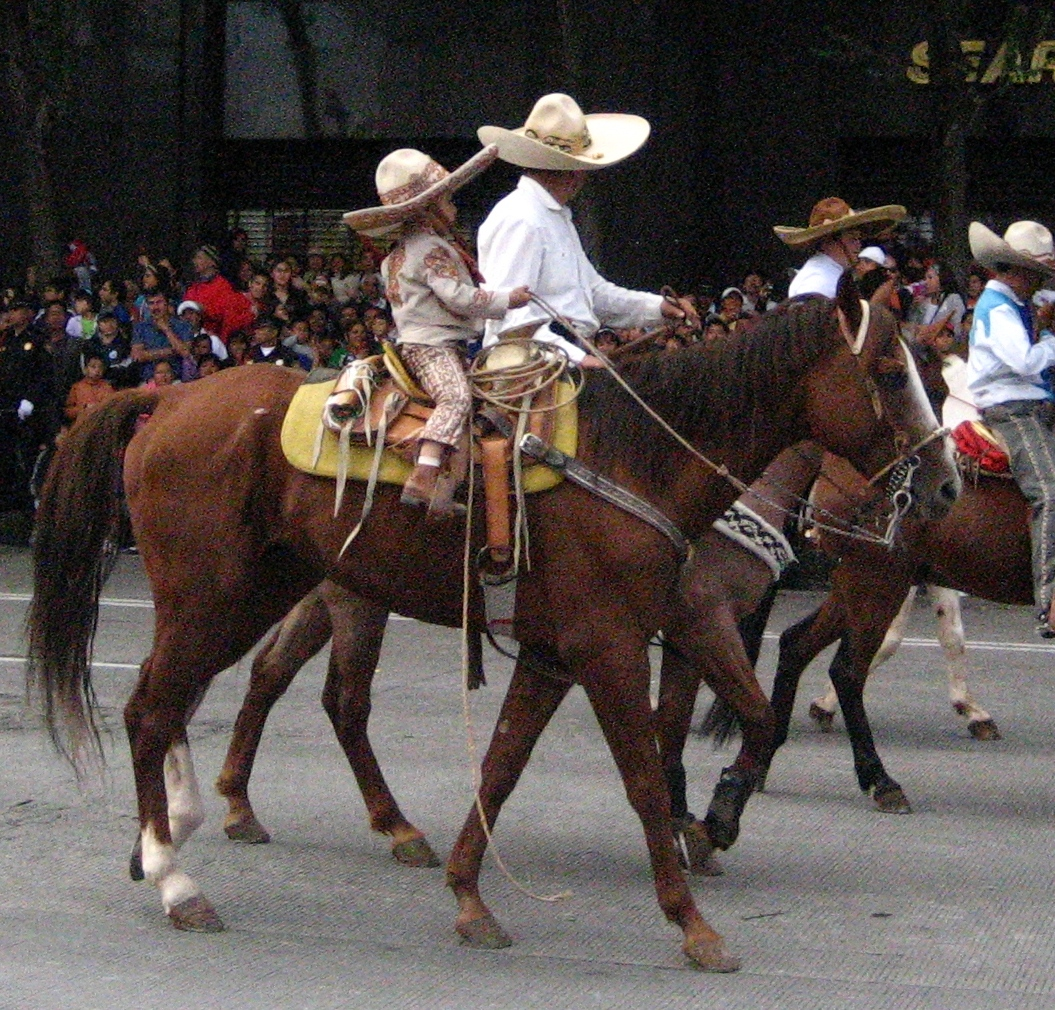
Modern child in Mexican parade wearing modern day charro attire on horse outfitted in vaquero-derived equipment including wide, flat-horned saddle, bosalita and spade-type bit, carrying romal reins and reata

The Spanish tradition evolved further in what today is Mexico, and the Southwestern United States. Most vaqueros were men of mestizo, and mulatto origin while most of the hacendados (ranch owners) were ethnically Spanish.

The vaqueros in New Spain (Colonial Mexico) in the 16th century were mostly mulatto and black, with the natives also taking part. By the 1570s, though, mulattoes and blacks had become the overwhelming majority, especially the former, as a result from the high mortality rate of the indigenous Mexicans due to Old World diseases and war, according to a Mexican Mesta ordinance. The ordinance, dated March 5, 1576, states:

Don Martin Enriquez &c. Inasmuch as by the older cattle breeders of this New Spain it has been reported to me that all the cattle ranching, as well as the branding, collecting and removing the steers for the butcher shops, and doing the rodeos, was almost universally done by Mulattos, and since there began to be cattle, and cattle ranching, they had never received more than twelve, fifteen, twenty, and at most up to twenty-five or thirty pesos a year; and that for the last two years now, as there had been a high mortality of Indians who also helped in the said cattle ranching, the said Mulattos had demanded higher wages, and asked for fifty, eighty, one hundred, and even two hundred pesos, and they did not want to continue working if they were not given the said wages...

By the late 16th century, with the growth of the mestizo population, mestizos and mulattoes had become the bulk of the vaquero population. In Treatise on the Heathen Superstitions (1629), Spanish Priest Hernando Ruiz de Alarcón explained the distinct geographic, environmental and cultural circumstances of Mexico and the racial composition of vaqueros:

Since in this land it is so necessary, so common and so easy for every kind of people to ride on horseback, because all the land is very rough, the settlements are very far apart, the roads lack provisions, and horses and other beasts exist in large quantities and along with this there are many herds of cattle where large quantities of Mulattos, Mestizos, Indians and other vile people work as vaqueros; […] and although the majority of those in this occupation of vaquero are mestizos or mulattos, even so I make mention here of this because Indians also take part […]

In Santa Fe de Nuevo México, however, both Hispano and Pueblo people owned land and livestock.

Those early vaqueros in the 16th century, whether slave or free, lived on a cattle estancia and worked for a single cattle baron for most of their lives. But towards the end of that century, in the Bajío region and in the Kingdom of Nueva Galicia, the largest cattle ranching region of all New Spain, a new type of vaquero began to appear. Called hombres de fuste ('saddle-tree men'), vagamundos ('drifters', 'vagabonds', or 'nomads'), and forajidos ('outlaws'), these vaqueros roamed the Mexican countryside on horseback going from village to village, estancia to estancia, working for the highest bidder. They were superior horsemen and spent their entire lives on horseback. Many were runaway black or mulatto slaves, others dabble in the crime of “abigeato” (cattle rustling), among other crimes. They carried weapons such as an arquebus, desjarretadera ('hocking lance'), sickle, and knives. Spanish priest and auditor Gaspar de la Fuente warned of the existence of these outlaw nomadic vaqueros in a report to the king, dated April 1, 1603 in Guadalajara:

The number of Mestizos and Mulattoes has grown so much in these realms, and so have the excesses and crimes that they commit every day, striking terror to the heart of the population, who is unable to do anything about it, because as Vaqueros, they ride on horseback with desjarretaderas and scythes, and they gather in gangs and nobody dares to confront them. His Majesty would remedy this by ordering that none of the aforementioned be able to carry such a weapon (under penalty of death) in a town or in an uninhabited place if it is not on the appointed days that they are cattle hunting, and in the company of their boss...

In another description, in a letter dated April 20, 1607, by Spanish priest and lawyer Luis Ramírez de Alarcón, states:

In the Royal mining town of Zacatecas and towards the north, it fills up with Black, Mestizo and Mulatto outlaws, all of them Vaqueros, and they cannot be captured and be punished because they have light horses and protection from the estancieros […] these people are agile, robust and grow in their generation and multiply too much, and one can very well expect trouble, because […] there are men that gather 300 horsemen from these outlaws to work as vaqueros, and most are well armed with strong cueras, arquebuses, scythes, desjarretaderas and other weapons

Andrew Sluyter argues that the lasso originated among Mexican vaqueros. A set of discriminatory laws passed by the Mesta in 1574 prohibited black, mulatto, mestizo, and indigenous vaqueros from owning or keeping a desjarretadera, a hooked lance used to capture and kill cattle. Those caught with one would receive a punishment of either a fine of 20 gold pesos—ten months of pay for the average vaquero—or at least 100 lashes in public. Black and mulatto slaves fared worst since they received no salary, so the automatic punishment was lashing. According to Sluyter, black and mulatto vaqueros circumvented the law by roping from horseback as an alternative way to capture cattle. He further argues that the saddle horn has a specifically Afro-Mexican origin, and is derived from West African saddle designs where the horn was used to hang bags.

=== Rancheros ===
Eventually, towards the 18th century, those nomadic vaqueros, as well as those that lived on the cattle estancias, began to be known under the name of rancheros. The term ranchero comes from rancho, a term that was given in Mexico, since the 18th century, to the countryside or hamlets where cattle were raised or land was sowed. Spanish priest, Mateo José de Arteaga, in his —"Description of the Diocese of Guadalajara de Indias" (1770)— defined "Rancho" as: "those places in which few people live with few goods and housed in huts". While the Spanish friar, José Alejandro Patiño, in his text —Topografía del Curato de Tlaxomulco (1778)— defined it as: "In these Indian kingdoms, Ranchos are country houses of little pomp and value, where men of average means and the poor live, cultivating the small plots of land that they own or rent, sowing to the extent that each one can afford and raising their domestic, country animals, according to their strength."

These rural lands and hamlets, were part of a Hacienda, since most land belonged to the landed elites. Thus, a hacienda was made up of ranchos, and in those Ranchos lived the people that worked for the hacienda, the rancheros. The rancheros managed the cattle and horses, working as vaqueros, caporales, Mayordomos or horse-tamers, among other jobs. By the 1840s, Spanish (from Spain) dictionaries included the Mexican definition of rancho as: "In Mexico it is a separate farmhouse dependent on a hacienda"; while for ranchero they give the definition: "the one who lives on a rancho; it is usually understood the same as CAMPESINO [countryman, or farmer]". Spanish historian and journalist Niceto de Zamacois, defined the terms ranchero and rancho, as: "The men of the countryside who carry out their jobs on horseback are given the name of 'Rancheros,' derived from the word Rancho that is applied to a small hacienda, or to a part of a large one that is divided into villages or ranchos. Those who carry out the same tasks in the haciedas of Veracruz are given the name of 'Jarochos'."

Thomas Mayne Reid, an Irish-American novelist who fought in the Mexican-American War, defined the terms in the 1840’s, as follows:

The "RANCHERO" is a Mexican countryman, above the order of the serf or peon. He is the vaquero at times, or the arriero [muleteer], or he may be possessed of a small holding, and farm it for himself. He is a great horseman, and always mounted, galloping after cattle, or amusing himself in some other way. The Vaquero is also a ranchero; so, too, is the montero, who is so called from living in a mountainous district. VAQUERO - A "Vaquero" is a ranchero or countryman, who looks after cattle. As Mexico is chiefly a grazing country it will be seen that there are many of its inhabitants employed in this pursuit. The vaquero is always mounted, and generally well dressed. He carries the lazo constantly; and he is the man, above all others, who can use it with dexterity. He can fling it over a bull's horns twenty yards off, or loop it round the foot of the animal when going at a full gallop! This feat I have witnessed a hundred times. Your vaquero is also expert in the game of "Colea de toros" or " bull-tailing"—that is, he can, on horseback, catch the tail of a running bull —whip it under the hind leg— and fling the animal on its back! This feat also have I witnessed over and again. The vaquero takes his name from "vacas," signifying cows or cattle.

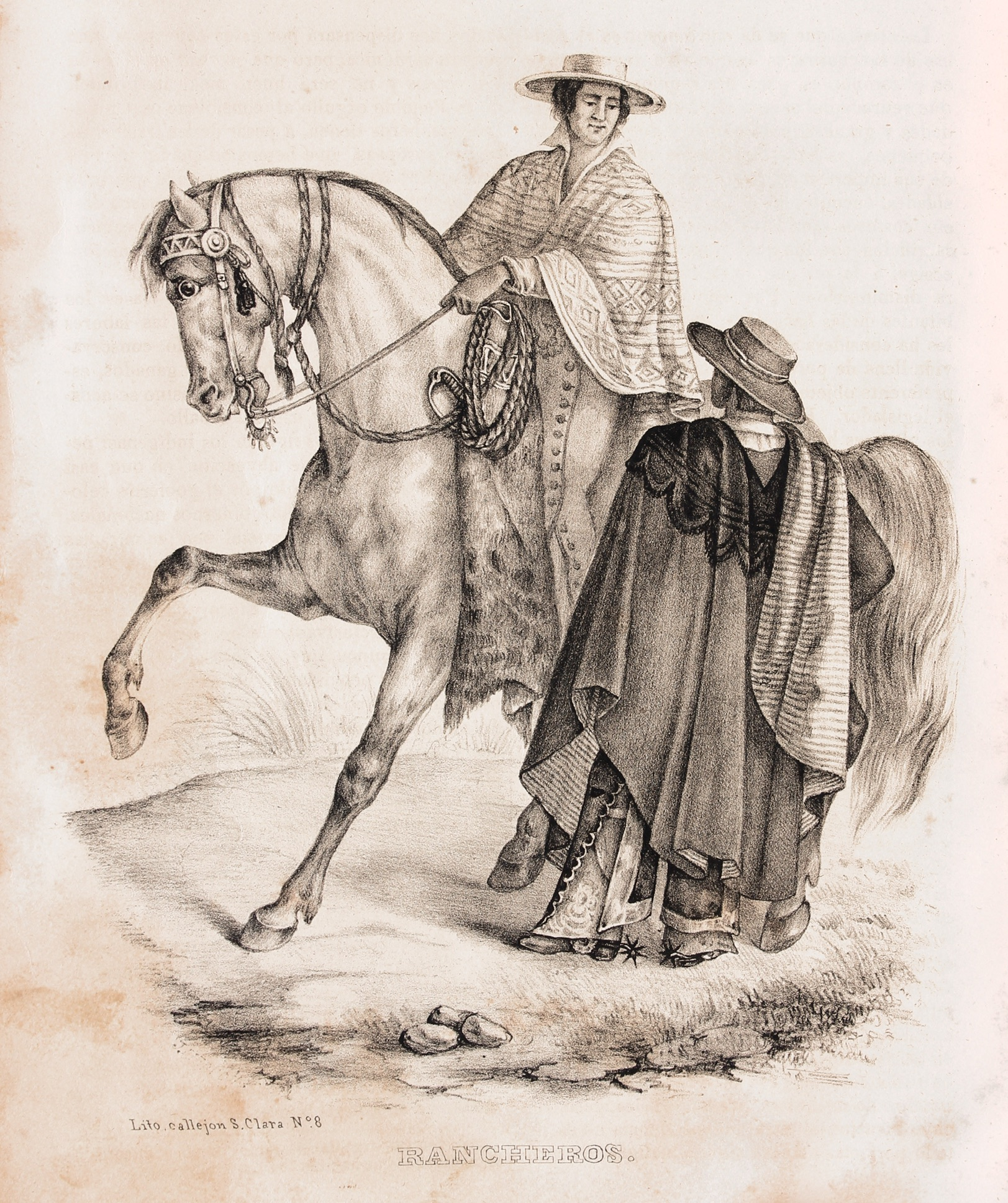
Rancheros (1844). The rancheros or charros were known for their superior horsemanship, and their unique attire designed for horse riding.

Thus, ranchero is the inhabitant of the Mexican countryside, a horse-mounted countryman, who performed all his duties on the hacienda or countryside on horseback, working as vaqueros and caporales, among other jobs. The term charro started off in the 18th century as a derogatory term for Rancheros, synonymous with the English terms "yokel", or "bumpkin", but evolved to be synonymous with ranchero; thus both, ranchero and charro were, historically, the same thing, a name for the people of the countryside, more specifically the horse-mounted country people (horsemen). Although, in some instances, Charro was used specifically, for the Vaqueros of Tierra-Adentro, or the interior land, which included the Bajio and northern Mexico, or anything beyond north of Mexico City. English naval officer and explorer, George Francis Lyon, explained that while most Rancheros had a light, active and sinewy frame, some of the vaqueros of the Tierra Adentro were as tall and muscular as the Yorkshiremen.

Rancheros or charros were known for their superb horsemanship and athleticism, and for their colorful and unique costume, designed for horse riding. The outfit of the vaqueros, known as "traje de ranchero" (ranchero outfit) or "traje de charro" (charro outfit), consisted, in the 1840s, of leather or cloth pants with buttons on the sides; embossed deer or goat skin boots wrapped around the calves; large spurs and a wide-brimmed hat called jarano, which were accompanied by the manga (similar to a poncho) or a serape, and armas de agua or "water shields" hanging from the Mexican saddle to protect the rider from the rain.

In his book Mexico in 1842 (1844), Spanish lawyer and monarchist Luis Manuel del Rivero, wrote:

The Ranchero is a man of higher thoughts, very strong, great horseman, a good drinker, who spends a peso without hesitation when he has any; that when he walks he drags his colossal and sonorous spurs, while handling his quirt; that on horseback he never gets rid of his machete, tucked under his thigh, and often crossing it with that of his adversary, or with that of a friend, giving or receiving a slash merely for fun and amusement. He is a man who, confined in his rancheria, cultivates the land with his wife and children, or perhaps leaves this servile occupation to his family, and he gives himself up to the noblest of arms in the woods and at crossroads. He is a man that when he works in the haciendas, he performs all his tasks on horseback and follows his master everywhere, to whom he usually sells his body and soul. He is an Arab in his habits, a little nomadic, and more specifically in the knowledge and handling of the horse, which he raises and educates like a son, works him without compassion, and loves him with delirium as the faithful companion of his adventures, and the noble instrument of his amusements and his glories. His attire, boots made of leather with which the leg is wrapped several times; spurs, as I have said, colossal; wide leather or cloth pants over cloth underwear; cotton shirt; a sash with which the waist is secured; a cotona, that is, a short leather jacket that is worn over the head, and a very large and heavy chambergo or Jarano hat. For overdress, a Manga or Serape. His horse's trappings are no less grotesque, since the Vaquero saddle with its large stirrups and flaps, especially if it is complemented by an anquera, water shields and other trifles, is a world in the midst of which the Ranchero finds himself in his world, and he believes himself superior to all the powerful men of the earth, executing extremely difficult spins and movements.

Mexican traditions spread both South and North, influencing equestrian traditions from Argentina to Canada.

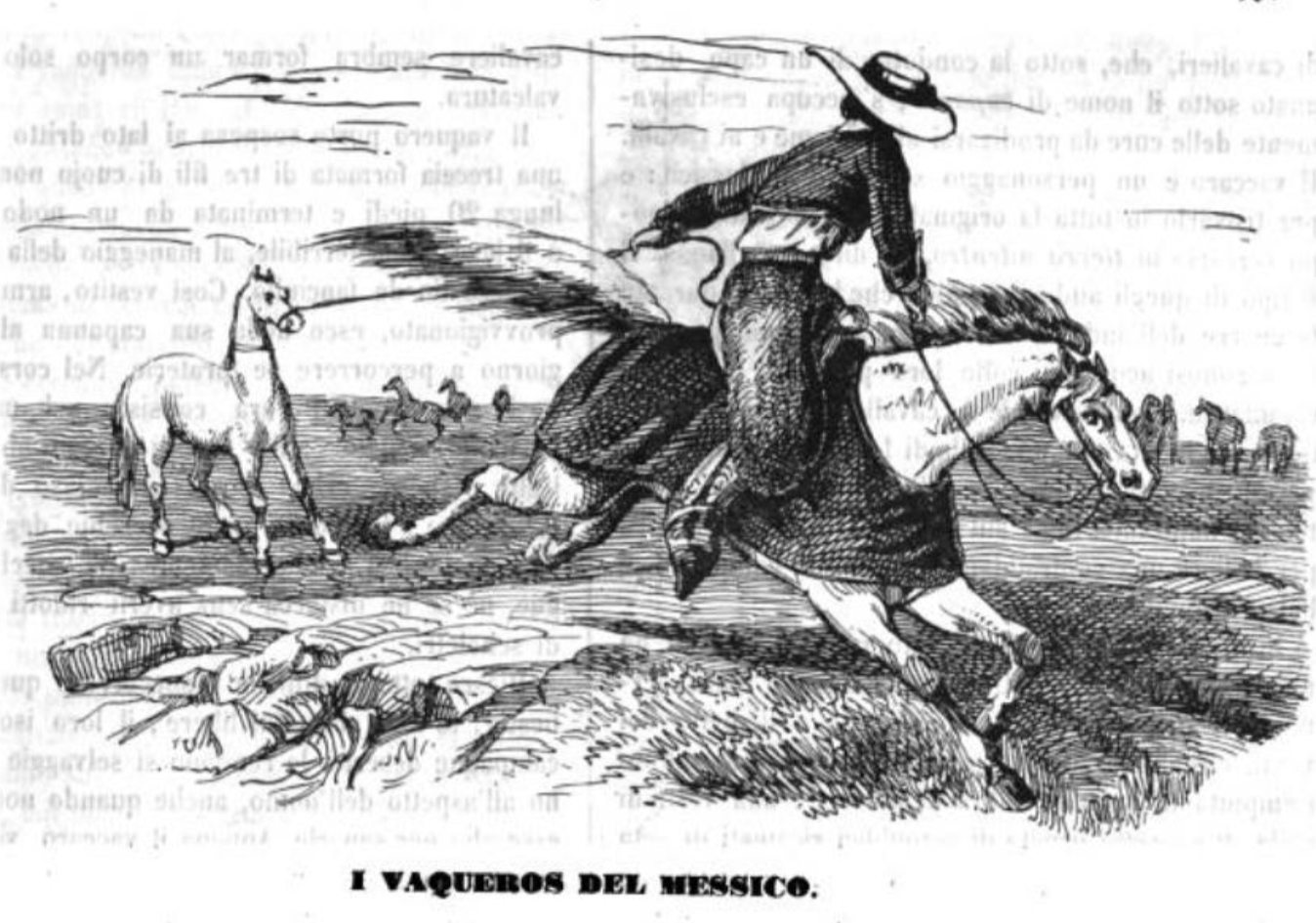
Mesteñeros were Charros who hunted Mesteño or “mustang” horses, wild ownerless horses that lived in northern Mexico and what is now the American southwest, to later sell them in the cities.

As English-speaking traders and settlers expanded westward, English and Spanish traditions, language and culture merged to some degree. Before the Mexican–American War in 1848, New England merchants who traveled by ship to California encountered both hacendados and vaqueros, trading manufactured goods for the hides and tallow produced from vast cattle ranches. American traders along what later became known as the Santa Fe Trail had similar contacts with vaquero life. Starting with these early encounters, the lifestyle and language of the vaquero began a transformation which merged with English cultural traditions and produced what became known in American culture as the "cowboy".

Mesteñeros were Charros that caught, broke and drove Mustangs to market in the Spanish and later Mexican, and then American territories. They caught the horses that roamed in Northern Mexico, the Great Plains and the San Joaquin Valley of California, and later in the Great Basin, from the 18th century to the early 20th century.

=== Modern United States ===
"Vaqueros invented the cowboy trade as we know it today." The vaquero heritage had an influence on cowboy traditions which arose throughout the California, Hawaii, Montana, New Mexico, Texas, and broader Western United States, distinguished by their own local culture, geography and historical patterns of settlement. Cowboy styles reflect origins in Texas, the southeast, and Mexico, while buckaroos have adopted, quite remarkably intact, techniques from Spanish and Mexican California. "The Southwestern United States has a caballero heritage that originates in New Mexico's Hispanic and indigenous groups from the region, whereas the "Texas" vaquero tradition melded Tejano techniques with ranching styles of eastern states from Louisiana to Florida, while the "buckaroo" or "California" tradition resembled Northern Mexico traditions. The modern distinction between caballero, vaquero, and buckaroo within American English reflects parallels between traditions of western horsemanship.

==== American Southwest ====
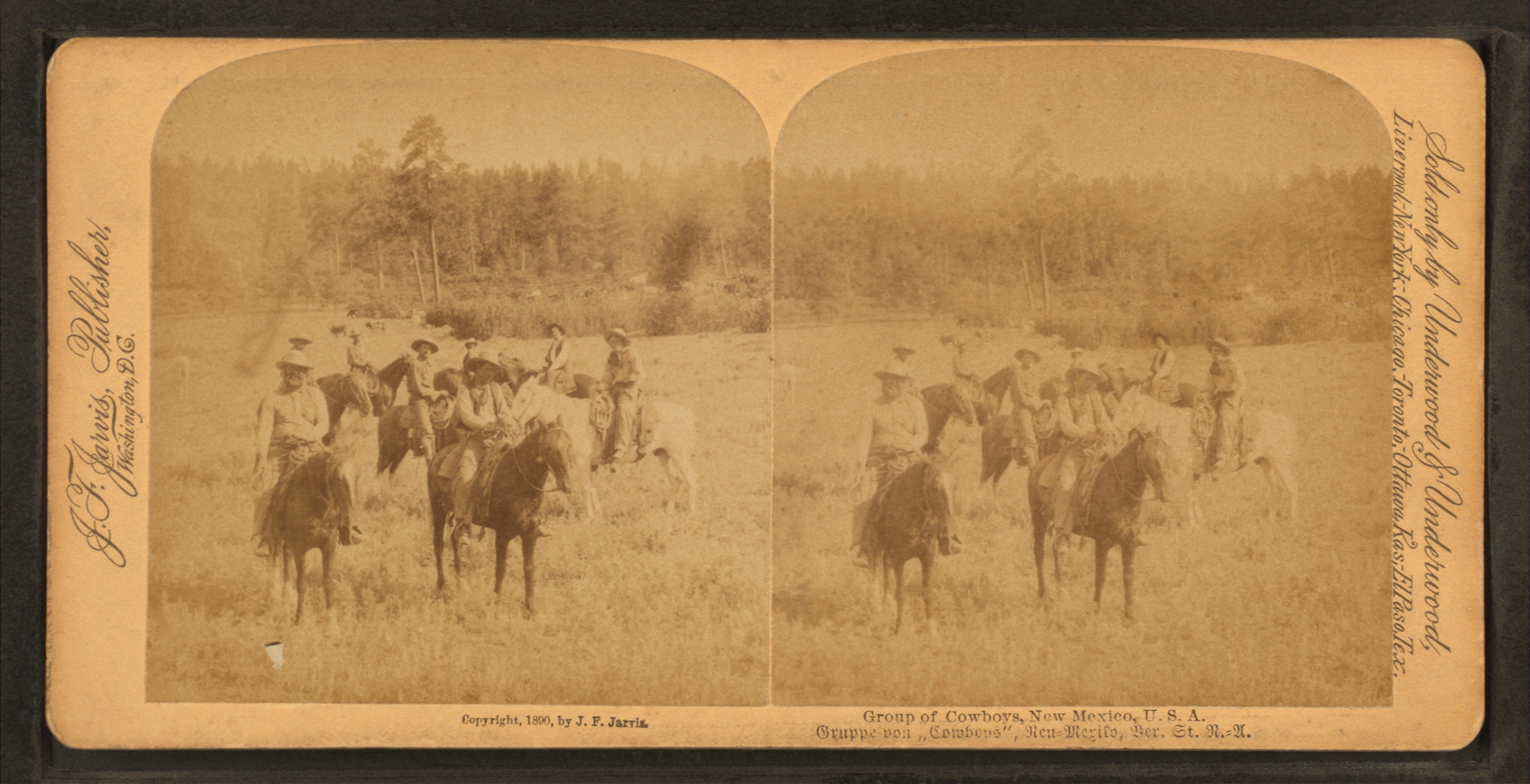
Circa 1890 photo of a group of cowboys in New Mexico

In the Southwestern United States, the Hispano, Pueblo, Navajo, and Apache traditions of Santa Fe de Nuevo México continue to hold significant influence over cowboy lifestyles in the region. This area became the New Mexico Territory and eventually the Southwestern US states of New Mexico, Arizona, and the southern portions of Colorado, Nevada, and Utah. Descendants of the Hispano and indigenous cowboys of former Nuevo México have long been referred to as caballero or caballera, a Spanish term that translates to 'gentlemen' or 'lady', but regionally means 'cowboy' or 'cowgirl'.

Cowboys in the Southwest are associated with popularizing Native American jewelry, Christian icons, Southwestern and New Mexican cuisine, Western music styles of Tejano and New Mexico music, along with other aspects into the general Western lifestyle.

==== California tradition ====
Cowboys of this tradition were dubbed buckaroos by English-speaking settlers. The words buckaroo and vaquero are still used on occasion in the Great Basin, parts of California and, less often, in the Pacific Northwest. Elsewhere, the term "cowboy" is more common. The vaqueros of the Americas were the horsemen and cattle herders of New Spain, who first came to California with the Jesuit priest Eusebio Kino in 1687, and later with expeditions in 1769 and the Juan Bautista de Anza expedition in 1774. They were the first cowboys in the region.

Even though the lands of the California vaqueros were fertile for farming, "it was not the disposition of Spanish Californians to over-exert themselves, so the raising of cattle, which was little drain on the energies, was a very much more agreeable way of life than farming ... there were few in the world who could surpass ... [the] vaquero in horsemanship." The future Mexican or Spanish vaqueros were placed in the saddle at 5 years of age, and sometimes earlier, and worked with young, often trained horses, which had originally arrived from Mexico in the 18th century and flourished in California and bordering territories during the Spanish/Mexican era.

Although the Californios were considered by most foreigners as great horsemen, their treatment and method of training the horses was frowned upon. Englishman William Robert Garner mention that their method of breaking and training horses: "...likewise tends to break the spirit of the animals, and injure them in their joints.[…] when it is tired they take the saddle off it, and make it fast to a post, without anything to eat, and keep it there for four or five days, on nothing but water." William Redmond Ryan, another English writer and immigrant, said that: "of the wild horses subjected to this process of training, at least one-fourth are killed, and a still larger proportion seriously injured." German immigrant Edward Vischer once commented that: "The barbarous Californians look upon a horse as a useful commodity which is of little value and easily replaced."

Settlers originally arriving from the United States prior to 1846 (Mexican War) could marry a Californio woman or apply for Mexican citizenship in order to receive a land grant, which would then almost require the new citizen to acquire the vaquero skills and life styles, a life style in which he would "invariably [keep] a horse saddled before his door, awaiting his pleasure. If it was necessary to go more than fifty steps, he rode." After the conquest of California, with the conclusion of the Mexican–American War in 1848, Americans began to flood the newly conquered territory with immigration, for the 1849 goldrush, which resulted in most of them being miners rather than livestock ranchers. The California vaquero or buckaroo, unlike the Texas cowboy, was considered a highly skilled worker, who usually stayed on the same ranch where he was born or had grown up. He generally married and raised a family. In addition, the geography and climate of much of California was dramatically different from that of Texas, allowing more intensive grazing with less open range, plus cattle in California were marketed primarily at a regional level, without the need (nor, until much later, even the logistical possibility) to be driven hundreds of miles to railroad lines. Thus, a horse- and livestock-handling culture remained in California and the Pacific Northwest that retained a stronger direct Mexican and Spanish influence than that of Texas.

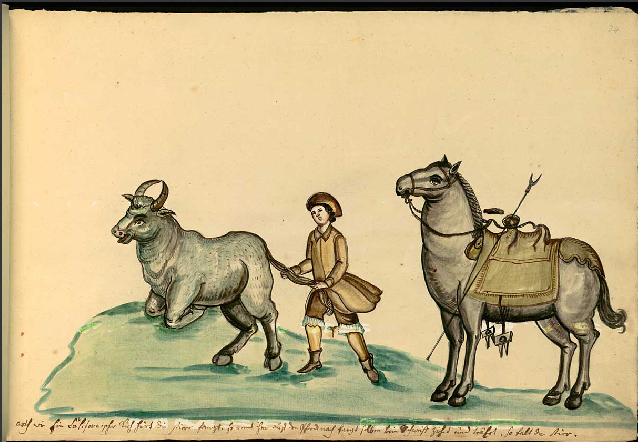
Bull-tailing (coleo) on foot in Baja California Sur (1762). Baja Vaqueros were the original Californio Vaqueros.

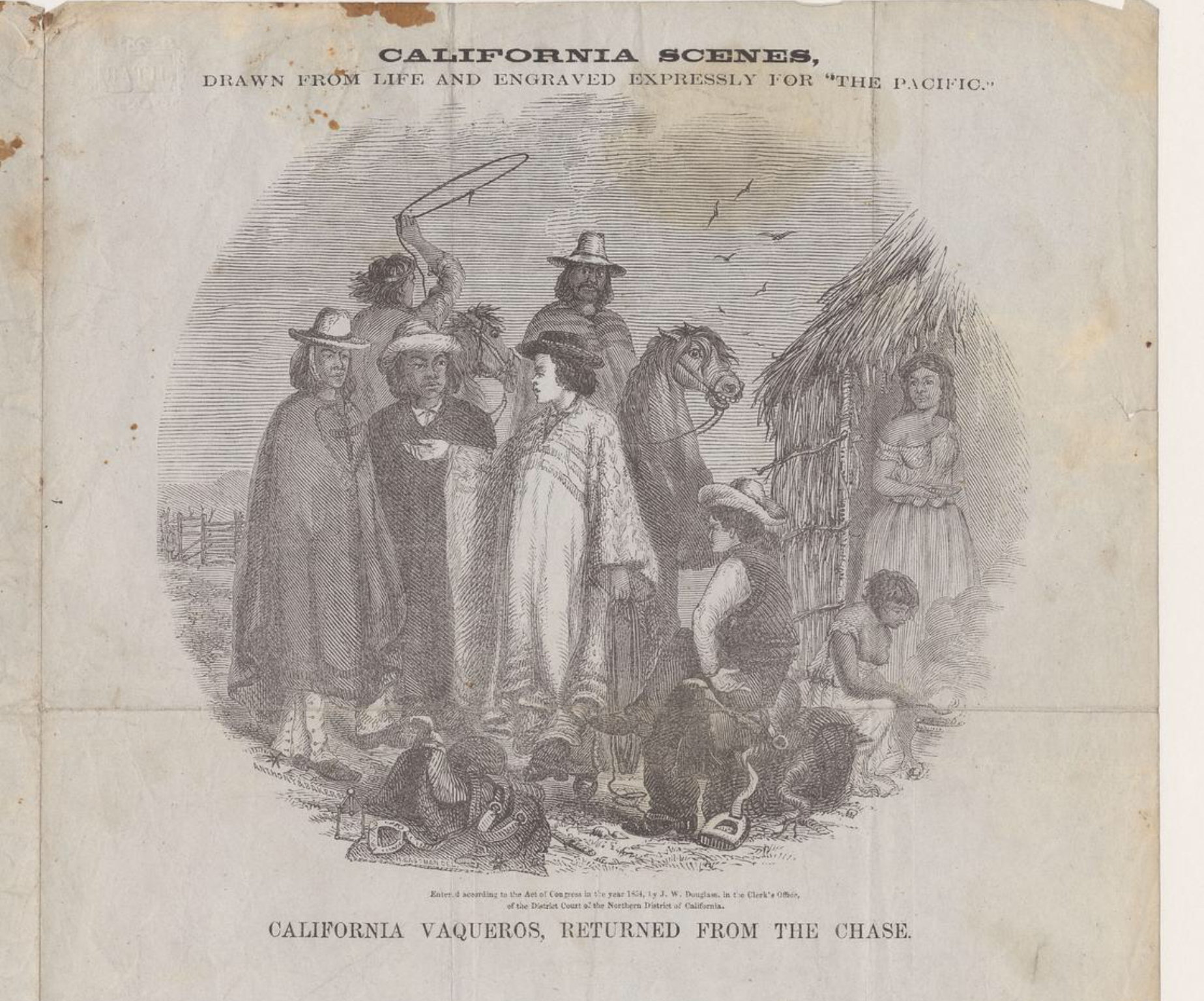
Californio Vaqueros returned from the chase

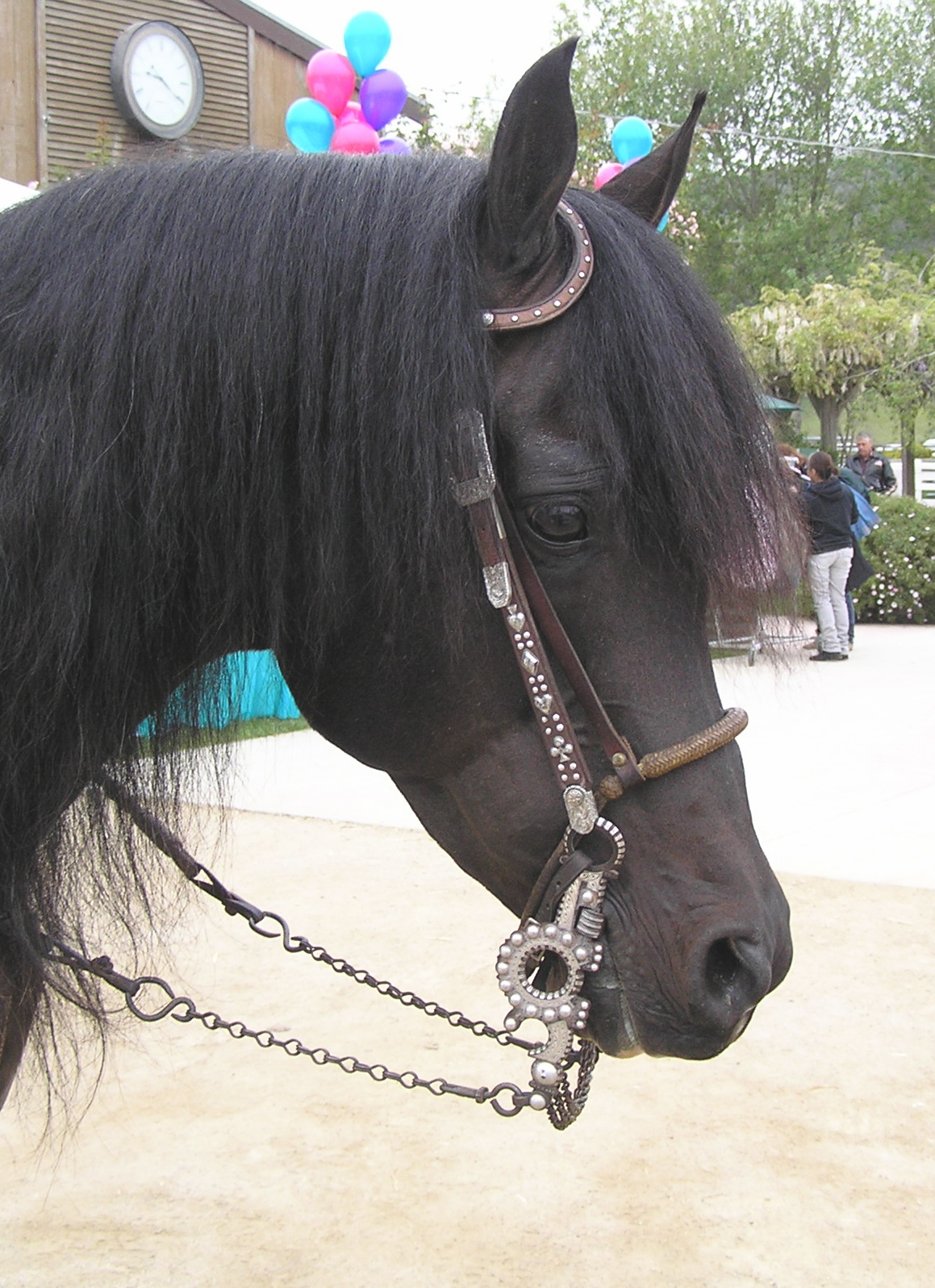
Finished "straight-up spade bit" with California-style bosalito and bridle

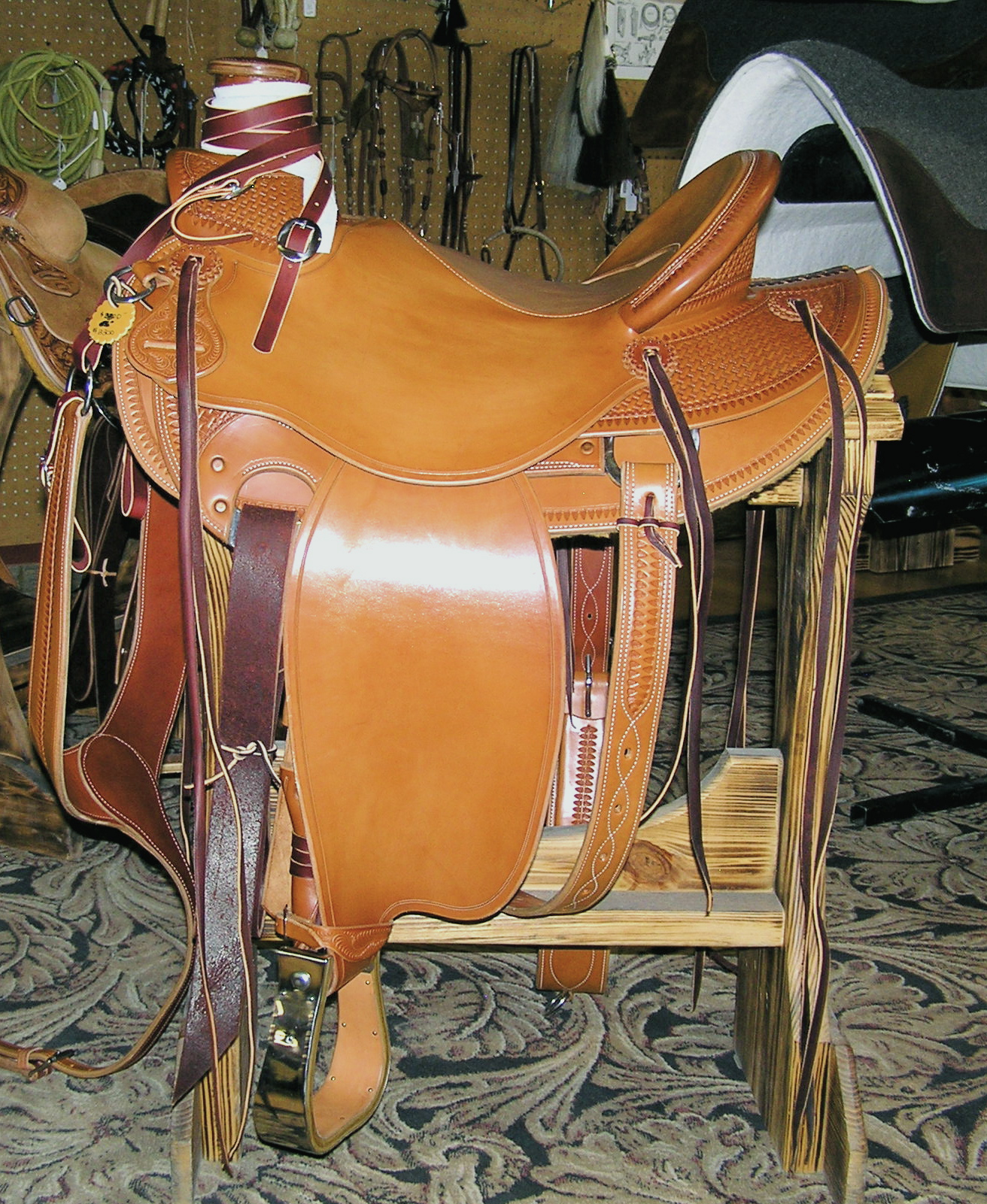
A "Wade" saddle, popular with working ranch buckaroo tradition riders, derived from vaquero saddle designs

==== Texas tradition ====
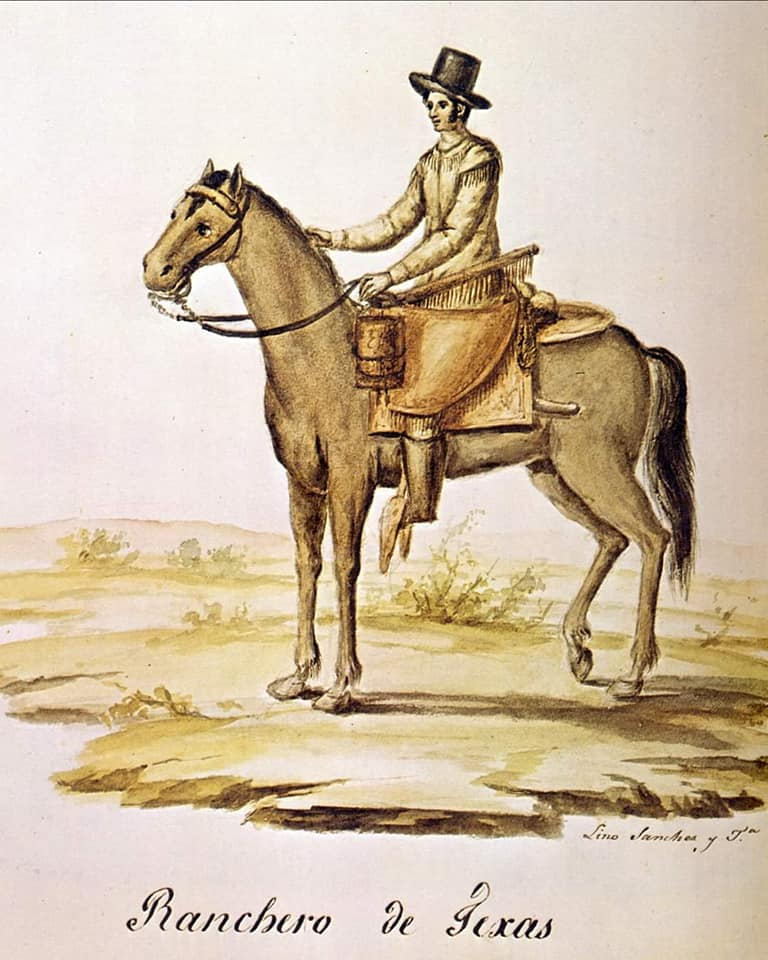
"Ranchero de Texas". An 1828 Tejano ranchero, by Lino Sanchez y Tapia. Charros from northern Mexico dressed differently, more modestly and less conspicuous than their southern counterparts

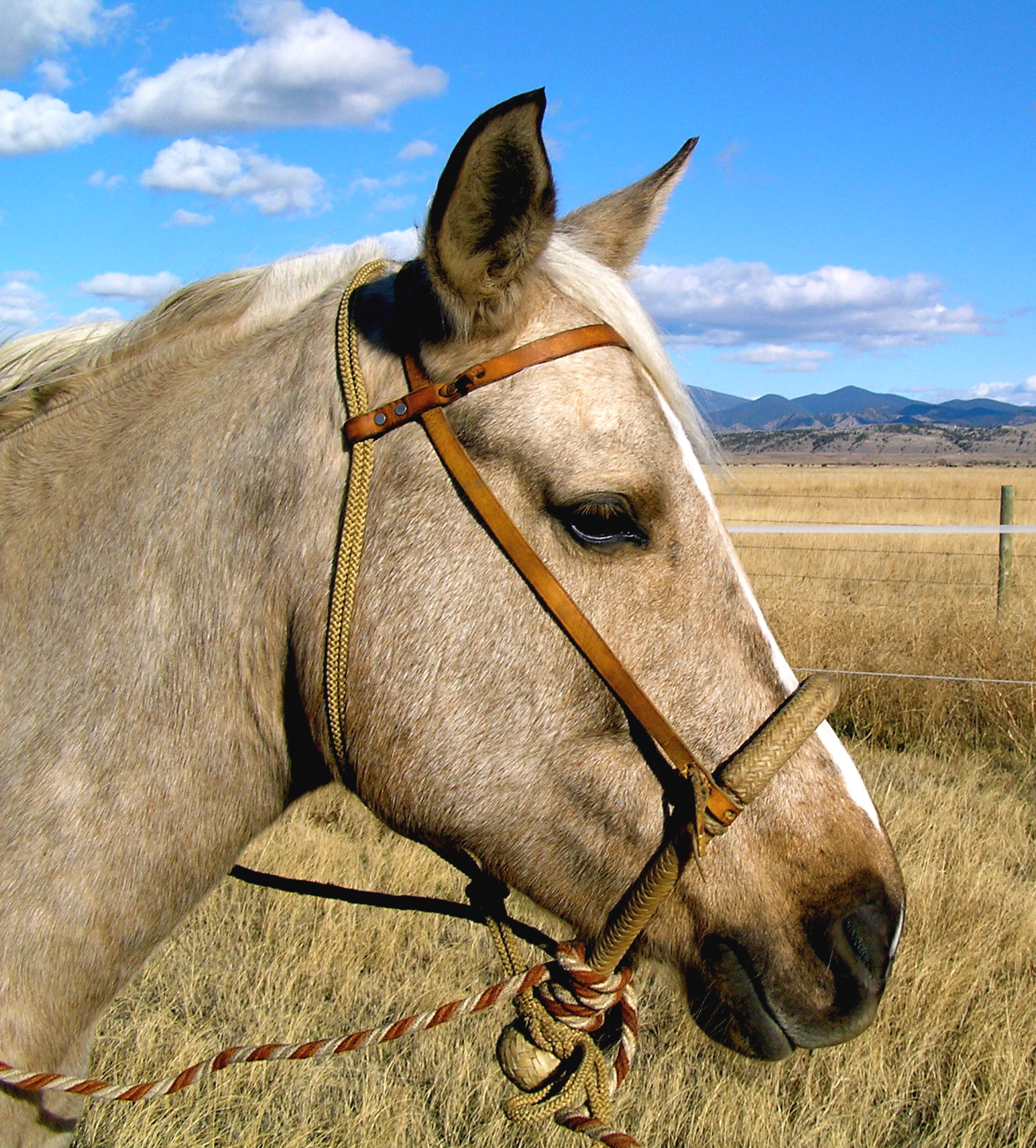
A Texas-style bosal with added fiador, designed for starting an unbroke horse

The Texas tradition arose from a combination of cultural influences, as well as the need to adapt to the geography and climate of west Texas and, later, the need to conduct long cattle drives to get animals to market. In the early 1800s, the Spanish Crown, and later, independent Mexico, offered empresario grants in what would later be Texas to non-citizens, such as settlers from the United States. In 1821, Stephen F. Austin and his East Coast comrades became the first Anglo-Saxon community in Texas. Following Texas independence in 1836, even more Americans immigrated into the empresario ranching areas of Texas. Here the settlers were strongly influenced by the Mexican vaquero culture, borrowing vocabulary and attire from their counterparts, but also retaining some of the livestock-handling traditions and culture of the Eastern United States and Great Britain.

Following the American Civil War, vaquero culture diffused eastward and northward, combining with the cow herding traditions of the eastern United States that evolved as settlers moved west. Other influences developed out of Texas as cattle trails were created to meet up with the railroad lines of Kansas and Nebraska, in addition to expanding ranching opportunities in the Great Plains and Rocky Mountain Front, east of the Continental Divide. The Texas-style vaquero tended to be an itinerant single male who moved from ranch to ranch.

==== Hawaiian paniolo ====
The Hawaiian cowboy, the paniolo, is also a direct descendant of the vaquero of California and Mexico. Experts in Hawaiian etymology believe paniolo is a Hawaiianized pronunciation of español. (The Hawaiian language has no /s/ sound, and all syllables and words must end in a vowel.) Paniolo, like cowboys on the mainland of North America, learned their skills from Mexican vaqueros.

Curtis J. Lyons, scientist and assistant government surveyor, wrote in 1892 for the Hawaiian Historical Society, that:

. . . at Waimea, the Mexican Hispano-Indian found his home and occupation. He was called by the Hawaiian, specifically, Huanu, Hoke, Hoakina, etc., these names of course meaning Juan, Jose, Joachin, etc. He had with him sometimes full-blooded Indians of Mexican origin, whom I saw in my boyhood. He was called generically "Paniolo" or "Espagnol," the word that now-a-days means "cow-boy." He brought with him the Mexican saddle in all its rich adornment of stamped bull-hide leather, and stirrups broad-winged. He brought the jingling spur with bells of hand-wrought steel. He brought the hair-rope in strands of alternate black and white, and the hand- whirled wheel for twisting it; also the hand-wrought bit, not so crude as it looked to be, and a necessity in bullock-hunting. All this away back in the thirties, long before the birth of the modern cow-boy. […] Last but not least, the lasso or lariat, braided evenly and lovingly from four strands of well-chosen hide, then well-stretched and oiled, coiled in the same left hand, that with the little and third ringer held the finely braided bridle rein; (Mexican too this was, and Mexican the causing of the rein to bear on the horse's neck, instead of to pull on the mouth.) A more forminable weapon this lasso than revolver or Winchester; and no artist has yet mastered the problem of depicting the throwing of the lasso, not even the inimitable Frederick Remington. […] Mexican saddles, bits and bridles, spurs and pack-saddles were long a specialty of Waimea manufacture. The tan-pit, the black- smith's shop, the saddler's shop, and shoemaker's too, all flour- ished as home industries—now, alas, no longer. The wire fence is limiting the size of the "drive in," the hoohuli bipi,—"round-up," the Americans call it. The merchant ship brings the cheap spur and inferior saddle for the degenerate paniolo of 1892; and so on—in short, the times are changed.

By the early 19th century, Capt. George Vancouver's gift of cattle to Pai`ea Kamehameha, monarch of the Hawaiian Kingdom, had multiplied astonishingly, and were wreaking havoc throughout the countryside. About 1812, John Parker, a sailor who had jumped ship and settled in the islands, received permission from Kamehameha to capture the wild cattle and develop a beef industry.

The Hawaiian style of ranching originally included capturing wild cattle by driving them into pits dug in the forest floor. Once tamed somewhat by hunger and thirst, they were hauled out up a steep ramp, and tied by their horns to the horns of a tame, older steer (or ox) that knew where the paddock with food and water was located. The industry grew slowly under the reign of Kamehameha's son Liholiho (Kamehameha II). Later, Liholiho's brother, Kauikeaouli (Kamehameha III), visited California, then still a part of Mexico. He was impressed with the skill of the Mexican vaqueros, and invited several to Hawaii in 1832 to teach the Hawaiian people how to work cattle.

Even today, traditional paniolo dress, as well as certain styles of Hawaiian formal attire, reflect the Spanish heritage of the vaquero. The traditional Hawaiian saddle, the noho lio, and many other tools of the cowboy's trade have a distinctly Mexican/Spanish look and many Hawaiian ranching families still carry the names of the vaqueros who married Hawaiian women and made Hawaii their home.

== See also ==
- El Vaquero, a student newspaper at Glendale Community College
- Campino
- Vaqueiros de alzada, northern Spanish nomadic people
- Western lifestyle

== Sources ==
- Bennett, Deb (1998) Conquerors: The Roots of New World Horsemanship. Amigo Publications Inc; 1st edition. ISBN 0-9658533-0-6
- Clayton, Lawrence; Hoy, James F.; Underwood, Jerald (2001). Vaqueros, Cowboys, and Buckaroos: The Genesis and Life of the Mounted North American Herders. Austin, TX: University of Texas Press. ISBN 978-0-292-71240-9.
- Cowan, Robert G. (1977) "Ranchos of California, a list of Spanish Concessions 1775-1822 and Mexican Grants 1822-1846". Academy Library Guild, Fresno, Calif
- Draper, Robert. "21st-Century Cowboys: Why the Spirit Endures." National Geographic, December 2007, pp. 114–135.
- Lehman, Tim. "The Making of the Cowboy Myth". The Saturday Evening Post, vol. 292, no. 1, Jan. 2020, pp. 80–83.
- Malone, John William. An Album of the American Cowboy. New York: Franklin Watts, Inc., 1971. SBN: 531-01512-2.
- Miller, Robert W. (1974) Horse Behavior and Training. Big Sky Books, Montana State University, Bozeman, MT
- Stewart, Kara L. (December 2004). "The Vaquero Way". HorseChannel.com. Horse Illustrated. Archived from the original on 2011-01-03.
- Varian, Sheila (2004). The Vaquero Tradition: Hackamore, 2 Rein and Spade Bit (DVD). California: Santa Ynez Historical Society.
- Vernam, Glenn R. Man on Horseback. New York: Harper & Row 1964.
