= Marquessate of the Valley of Oaxaca =

Hereditary title in Spanish nobility

- Creation date: 1529
- Created by: Charles V
- Peerage: Spain
- First holder: Hernán Cortés, 1st Marquess of the Valley of Oaxaca
- Present holder: Álvaro de Llanza y Figueroa, 15th Marquess of the Valley of Oaxaca
- Heir apparent: Claudia de Llanza y López-Quesada
- Remainder to: Absolute primogeniture

The Marquessate of the Valley of Oaxaca (Spanish: Marquesado del Valle de Oaxaca) is a hereditary marquessal title in the Spanish nobility and a former seignorial estate in New Spain. It was granted to Don Hernán Cortés, conquistador who led the conquest of the Aztec Empire, by Charles V, Holy Roman Emperor in 1529. Despite its name, the marquessate covered a much larger area than the Oaxaca Valley, comprising a vast stretch of land in the present-day Mexican states of Oaxaca, Morelos, Veracruz, Michoacán and Mexico.

The title was held by Cortés' descendants through 1814, when the Constitución de Apatzingan abolished hereditary titles in Mexico. After the 12th Marquess died in 1859, his successors as Duke of Monteleone appear to have not renewed this title until 1916, when the 16th Duke of Monteleone became the 13th Marquess of the valley of Oaxaca. The title again became dormant on his death in 1938. A member of a cadet branch of the family (descendant of the 7th Marchioness) asked for the resumption of the title in 1973, and it was granted to him. The descendants of the 13th Marquess, a family established in Italy, has claimed the title, but has not taken any legal action in Spain against the legal holder. Given the multiple claims, the 1535 Mayorazgo (entailment) guaranteeing the continuation of the Marquessate was conditioned on (among others) loyalty to the King of Spain.

The current and 15th Marquess is Álvaro de Llanza y Figueroa, a private equity fund manager and former Citigroup investment banker. He was born on 26 January 1960 and married Isabel López-Quesada in the chapel of the Real Club de la Puerta de Hierro in June 1988. They have 3 children.

== History ==
=== Background and bestowal ===
After the fall of Tenochtitlan, with the capture of the last Aztec Tlatoani, Cuauhtémoc, on 13 August 1521, the Aztec Empire disappeared, becoming part of the Spanish Empire. The success brought legal status for Cortés, whose position had been contested during the conquest. On 15 October 1522, a Royal Cedula was issued, appointing him Governor and Captain General of New Spain. Cortés personally governed the newly conquered territories until 1524, when he left for Honduras, heading an expedition against the rebel Cristóbal de Olid, who had declared his independence from Spain and claimed Honduras was his own.

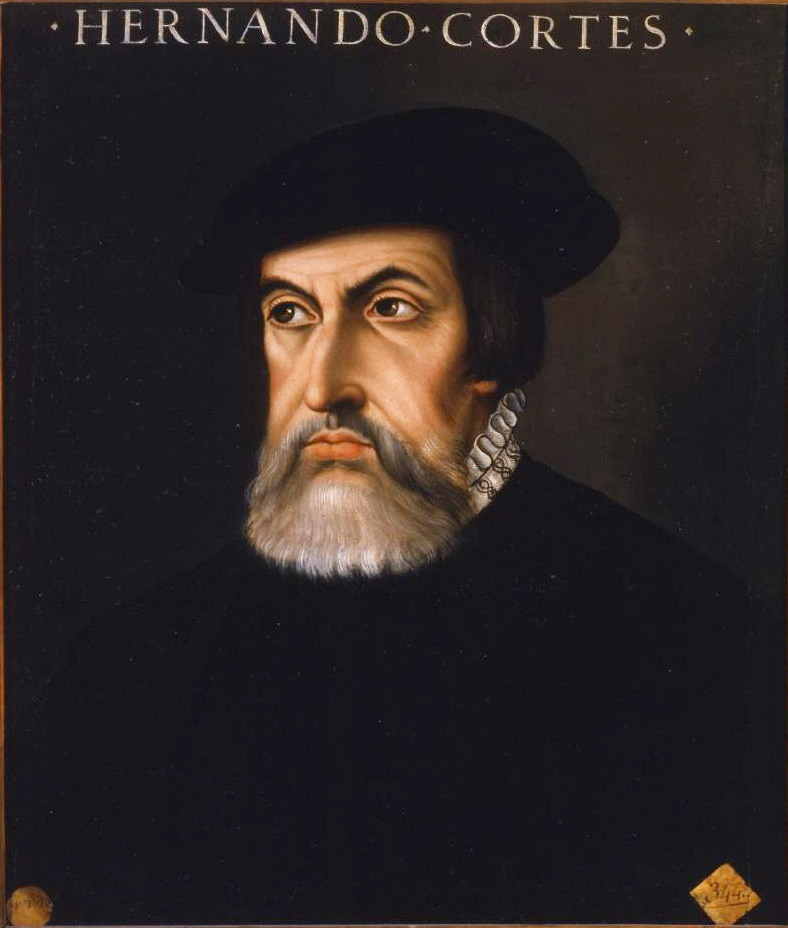
Hernán Cortés, conquistador of New Spain, 1st Marquess of the Valley of Oaxaca

At his arrival at Mexico City in 1526, after having defeated Olid, Cortés found that his enemies Bishop Fonseca, President of the Council of Indies, and Diego Velázquez de Cuéllar, Governor of Cuba, had persuaded the King to initiate a juicio de residencia (judgement of residence) against him. The chosen licentiate was Luis Ponce de León, who suspended Cortés from his office of governor on 16 July 1526, and took over the government himself. Ponce de León died shortly after his arrival, and was replaced by Marcos de Aguilar, who also died shortly after taking office. Cortés, who was accused by his opponents of having poisoned both of them, decided to return to Spain to appeal to the justice of the King.

In 1528, Cortés attained Castile, where he presented himself with great splendor before Charles V's court, responding forthrightly to the accusations of his enemies. Cortés gained the royal favor, and was created Marquess of the Valley of Oaxaca, being formally confirmed in his land holdings and vassals. The title was bestowed upon him by a Royal Cédula issued on 6 July 1529. He was also honored with the knighthood of the Order of Santiago and the honorary charge of Captain General of New Spain and of the Coast of the Southern Sea, and the noble title don, but was not reinstated the governorship of New Spain as he desired and never held any office with political power again. In 1529 he married the Spanish noblewoman Doña Juana de Zúñiga he had four legitimate children, including his only legitimate son, Don Martín, who succeeded to the title on his father's death in 1547.

On 27 July 1529, a new Royal Cédula was issued, permitting Cortés to establish a mayorazgo (entailed estate) or majorat annexed to the title. The institution of the majorat, which took place on 9 January 1535, ensured the permanence of the Marquessate, as it entailed most of Cortés' estates, urban properties and vassals, rendering them inheritable along with the marquessal dignity in the family. The mayorazgo also laid down the succession to the title, which is by male-preference primogeniture, i.e. female are allowed to succeed if she has no living brothers and no deceased brothers who left surviving legitimate descendants. It was also specified that the Marquess or Marchioness had to be a Roman Catholic, loyal to the King, and bear the name and arms of Cortés.

=== Territories and administration ===
Cortés' estate was one of the very few seignorial hereditary domains created in the Indies, along with the short-living Dukedom of Veragua and Marquessate of Jamaica; the Dukedom of Atrisco, the Marquessate of Santiago de Oropesa and the Lordship of Maní. The Spanish crown preferred to reward conquistadors via the encomienda system, granting tribute and labor from specific indigenous settlements to the holder of the encomienda. The encomiendas could only be inherited up to two generations, and the encomenderos had no political or judiciary power in their lands, depending on the pertinent Royal Audience and Captaincy General or Intendance. Far from it, the Marquess of the Valley of Oaxaca had full civil and criminal jurisdiction over his 23,000 vassals, and could name justice and administrative officials. Although the crown had granted the title and privileges, the "royal authorities made continual efforts to prevent the Marquesado from fully acquiring the political and juridical power required in the classic feudal model.".

The Marquessate granted to Cortés was not a geographically unified estate, but consisted of separate, fertile, populous, and often strategic areas in different parts of Mexico but with economic potential. The holdings covered a total extension of over 11,500 square kilometres. Cortés built a palace in Cuernavaca, (now the capital of the state of Morelos), which is relatively close to Mexico city, where he had substantial holdings. House to house censuses from ca. 1535 in the Nahuatl language are extant for the Cuernavaca region, which give important information about the social and economic structure of indigenous communities held by Cortés. It is likely that the censuses were carried out as part of the dispute between Cortés and the Spanish crown about the number of tribute payers Cortés actually held. In the censuses Cortés is referred to directly by his title of Marqués. The censuses also give important information about the extent to which Christian evangelization was effective at the local level, since each member of a household was identified as baptized or unbaptized. This type of local-level documentation in indigenous languages are used in Mesoamerican ethnohistory (also termed the New Philology) to write history from indigenous viewpoints. The Cuernavaca censuses demonstrate that although Cortés was the recipient of tributes and was acknowledged as the Indian communities' overlord, these communities continued to function with little change fifteen years after the conquest of Mexico.

The Marquessate was composed of seven jurisdictions: four Corregimientos and three Alcaldías Mayores. The Corregimiento of Coyoacán, of 550 km^{2}, included the main town, 34 villages (among others Mixcoac, San Agustín de las Cuevas, San Ángel, Churubusco and Tacubaya) and 5 haciendas. Depending on the Corregimiento of Toluca were 12 villages and an hacienda of 450 km^{2}, and of the Corregimiento of Charo Matlazinco, of 100 km^{2}, San Miguel Charo, 2 villages and an hacienda. The Corregimiento of Jalapa de Tehuantepec, headed by Santa María Jalapa del Marqués, with 7 haciendas that summed up 550 km^{2}. The holdings were to bring enormous income to the Marquessate when it was managed well was a large profit-making, economic enterprise with a centralized administration.

Palace of Cortés, Cuernavaca. Main seat of government of the Marquessate of the Valley of Oaxaca, and residence of the 1st, 2nd and 4th Marchionesses.

This last Corregimiento included until 1560 the port of Tehuantepec, when King Philip II issued a Royal Cédula, dated 16 December, which removed Tehuantepec from the marquessal estate, but specified that the Marquess should receive in exchange the equivalence of the tributes in gold that the town produced for the Royal Treasury. The Royal Audience of Mexico, on 23 November 1563, fixed a perpetual annual reward of 1,527 pesos of gold and 3,442 fanegas of maize paid by the villages of Tenango del Valle and Chimalhuacán.

The Alcaldía Mayor of the four towns of the Marquessate (Santa María de Oaxaca, Cuilapan, Etla and Santa Ana Tlapacoyan), of 1,500 km^{2}, included 34 villages, 2 haciendas and a sugar ingenio. Notwithstanding being surrounded by lands of this Alcaldía, the city of Antequera (today Oaxaca de Juárez) was patrimony of the Crown. The Alcaldía Mayor of Cuernavaca spanned the former Corregimientos of Acapixtla and Oaxtepec, covering an area of 4,100 km^{2}. It included the city of Cuernavaca, head of the Marquessate; 80 villages, 8 haciendas and 3 sugar ingenios, situated in Tlaltenango (the first one in New Spain), Amatitlán and Atlacomulco. The Alcaldía Mayor of Tuxtla and Cotaxtla, headed by the town of Santiago Tuxtla, was composed of 51 villages.

Up to 1567, the Marquess assigned the general supervision of the Estate affairs to the High Steward (Mayordomo Mayor), an official directly below him whose work consisted of routine collection and disbursement of funds and materials, as well as the conduct of lawsuits. In that year, the viceregal authorities discovered a conspiracy led by Don Martín Cortés, 2nd Marquess and his brother Martín Cortés the Mestizo, planning to proclaim the former King of New Spain, supported by the conquistadors, who were unhappy with the New Laws which restricted the inheritance of encomiendas. The King ordered the sequestration of the Marquessate, which meant the Crown seized control of the Estate and withdrew all its incomes; the leaders being expelled from New Spain and forbidden to return.

Although the sequestration was lifted in 1593, the Marchionesses lost direct control of the administration of the Estate, as they had to retain the structure through which the Crown had worked, which relinquished the governing autonomy they used to exercise. From then, the Marquessate had a fixed bureaucracy: The Governor and Privative Judge of the Estate (Gobernador y Juez Privativo), the Estate Controller (Contador), the Estate Lawyer (Abogado de Cámara), the Estate Solicitor (Procurador), the Estate Bailiff (Agente solicitador), the Estate Executioner (Ministro ejecutor), the Administrator of houses and ground rents and the Interpreter of the Nahuatl. These major officials met together as a group, called the Junta, to discuss Estate affairs. Also, there was an office in Madrid, the General Direction, so that the decisions could be taken jointly with the agents of the Marquess.

The Marquesado del Valle Codex, written in the second half of the 16th century, includes 28 petitions filed by local landowners in the Nahuatl language requesting return of their seized lands.

=== From the Cortés to the Pignatellis ===
Don Martín, the 2nd Marquess, obtained royal pardon in 1574, returning from his exile in Oran and recovering part of his sequestered lands in Mexico. However, he could not go back to New Spain and still had to pay a fine of 50,000 ducats and lend 100,000 more to the Crown. He died in Madrid in 1589 and was succeeded in the title by his eldest son, Don Hernando Cortés, 3rd Marquess of the Valley of Oaxaca, who was reinstated the rest of his Estate in 1593, with the help of his brother-in-law, Diego Fernández de Cabrera, 3rd Count of Chinchón, close adviser to the King. The 3rd Marquess left no legitimate children, so the title passed on his death to his brother, Don Pedro Cortés, 4th Marquess of the Valley of Oaxaca. This Marquess was allowed to settle in Mexico, where he personally took up the running of the Estate, which had been controlled by administrators since 1567.

The 4th Marquess also died without surviving descendants, so the Marquessate was inherited by his niece, Doña Estafanía Carrillo de Mendoza y Cortés, married to the Sicilian Duke of Terranova. Doña Estefanía was the eldest daughter of Doña Juana Cortés, sister of the 3rd and the 4th Marchionesses, and her husband Don Count of Priego. Upon the inheritance of the title, in compliance with the mayorazgo or entailment, the family adopted the name Aragona Tagliavia Cortés, although commonly referred to as Tagliavia d'Aragona. This marriage produced a single child, Giovanna, one of the richest heiresses of her time, who married Ettore Pignatelli, 5th Duke of Monteleone, giving birth to a dynasty that assembled the immense wealth of the Aragonas, the Tagliavias, the Pignatellis and the Cortés, their titles and their fiefs, among which the Mexican marquessate was the crown jewel. Upon marriage, the groom assumed the name Aragona Pignatelli Cortés for him and all his descendants, who however where generally known as Pignatelli d'Aragona.

== Marquesses of the Valley of Oaxaca (1529–present) ==
- Don Hernán Cortés, 1st Marquess of the Valley of Oaxaca (1529–1547).
- Don Martín Cortés, 2nd Marquess of the Valley of Oaxaca (r. 1547–1589), eldest legitimate son of the 1st Marquess.
- Don Hernando Cortés, 3rd Marquess of the Valley of Oaxaca (r. 1589–1602), eldest son of the 2nd Marquess.
- Don Pedro Cortés, 4th Marquess of the Valley of Oaxaca (r. 1602–1629), second son of the 2nd Marquess
- Doña Estefanía Carrillo de Mendoza y Cortés, Duchess of Terranova, (married to Diego de Aragón, IV Duke of Terranova) 5th Marchioness of the Valley of Oaxaca (r. 1635–1653), eldest daughter of the 2nd Marquess' elder daughter.
- Giovanna Tagliavia d'Aragona, (married to Ettore Pignatelli, 4th Prince of Noia) 5th Duchess of Terranova, 6th Marchioness of the Valley of Oaxaca (1619–1692), only daughter of the 5th Marchioness.
- Giovanna Pignatelli d'Aragona, 8th Duchess of Monteleone, 7th Marchioness of the Valley of Oaxaca (1666–1723), eldest daughter of the 6th Marchioness' eldest surviving son.
- Diego Pignatelli d'Aragona, 9th Duke of Monteleone, 8th Marquess of the Valley of Oaxaca (1687–1750), elder son of the 7th Marchioness.
- Fabrizio Pignatelli d'Aragona, 10th Duke of Monteleone, 9th Marquess of the Valley of Oaxaca (1718–1763), elder son of the 8th Marquess.
- Ettore Pignatelli d'Aragona, 11th Duke of Monteleone, 10th Marquess of the Valley of Oaxaca (1742–1800), elder son of the 9th Marquess.
- Diego Pignatelli d'Aragona, 12th Duke of Monteleone, 11th Marquess of the Valley of Oaxaca (1774–1818), elder son of the 10th Marquess.
- Giuseppe Pignatelli d'Aragona, 13th Duke of Monteleone, 12th Marquess of the Valley of Oaxaca (1795–1859), eldest surviving son of the 11th Marquess.

Dormant (1859–1916)

- Giuseppe Pignatelli d'Aragona, 16th Duke of Monteleone, 13th Marquess of the Valley of Oaxaca (1860–1938), eldest son of the 12th Marquess' second surviving son.

Dormant (1938–1984)

- Jorge de Llanza, 14th Marquess of the Valley of Oaxaca (1921–2001), 4th great-grandson of the 7th Marchioness' third son.
- Álvaro de Llanza, 15th Marquess of the Valley of Oaxaca (b. 1960), elder son of the 14th Marquess.

The heiress apparent is Doña Claudia de Llanza y López-Quesada (b. 1990)

=== Pignatelli (1938–present) ===
- Antonio Pignatelli d'Aragona, 17th Duke of Monteleone, "14th Marquess of the Valley of Oaxaca" (1892–1958), elder son of the 13th Marquess.
- Giuseppe Pignatelli d'Aragona, 18th Duke of Monteleone, "15th Marquess of the Valley of Oaxaca" (1931–1989), elder son of the "14th Marquess".
- Niccolò Pignatelli d'Aragona, 19th Duke of Monteleone, "16th Marquess of the Valley of Oaxaca" (b. 1923), grandson of the 13th Marquess' third brother.

The titular heir apparent is Prince Diego Pignatelli d'Aragona (b. 1958)

== Family tree ==
Hernán Cortés, 1st Marquess of the Valley of Oaxaca; 1485–1547
Martín Cortés, 2nd Marquess of the Valley of Oaxaca; 1533–1589
Hernando Cortés, 3rd Marquess of the Valley of Oaxaca; 1560-1602	Juana Cortés, Countess of Priego d. 1612	Pedro Cortés, 4th Marquess of the Valley of Oaxaca; 1566-1629
Estefanía Carrillo de Mendoza, Duchess of Terranova, 5th Marchioness of the Valley of Oaxaca; 1595-1653
Giovanna Tagliavia d'Aragona, Duchess of Monteleone; 5th Duchess of Terranova, 6th Marchioness of the Valley of Oaxaca; 1619-1692
Andrea Fabrizio Pignatelli d'Aragona, 7th Duke of Monteleone; 1640-1677
Giovanna Pignatelli d'Aragona, 8th Duchess of Monteleone; 7th Marchioness of the Valley of Oaxaca; 1666-1723
Diego Pignatelli d'Aragona, 9th Duke of Monteleone, 8th Marquesss of the Valley of Oaxaca; 1687-1750	Prince Antonio Pignatelli d'Aragona; 1700–1746
Fabrizio Pignatelli d'Aragona, 10th Duke of Monteleone, 9th Marquess of the Valley of Oaxaca; 1718-1763	Joaquín Pignatelli de Aragón, 16th Count of Fuentes; 1724–1776
Ettore Pignatelli d'Aragona, 11th Duke of Monteleone, 10th Marquess of the Valley of Oaxaca; 1742-1800	Juan Domingo Pignatelli de Aragón, 6th Duke of Solferino; 1757–1819
Diego Pignatelli d'Aragona, 12th Duke of Monteleone, 11th Marquess of the Valley of Oaxaca; 1774-1818	Juan Bautista Pignatelli de Aragón, 7th Duke of Solferino; 1799–1823
Giuseppe Pignatelli d'Aragona, 13th Duke of Monteleone, 12th Marquess of the Valley of Oaxaca; 1795-1859	María de la Concepción Pignatelli de Aragón, 9th Duchess of Solferino; 1824–1858
Diego Pignatelli d'Aragona, 14th Duke of Monteleone; 1823-1880	Antonio Pignatelli d'Aragona, 15th Duke of Monteleone; 1827-1881	Manuel María de Llanza, 10th Duke of Solferino; 1857-1927
Giuseppe Pignatelli d'Aragona, 16th Duke of Monteleone, 13th Marquess of the Valley of Oaxaca; 1860-1938	Prince Federico Pignatelli d'Aragona; 1864-1947	Luis Gonzaga de Llanza, 11th Duke of Solferino; 1884-1970
Antonio Pignatelli d'Aragona, 17th Duke of Monteleone, "14th Marquess of the Valley of Oaxaca"; 1892-1958	Prince Fabrizio Pignatelli d'Aragona; 1897-1953	Jorge de Llanza, 14th Marquess of the Valley of Oaxaca; 1921-2001
Giuseppe Pignatelli d'Aragona, 18th Duke of Monteleone, "15th Marquess of the Valley of Oaxaca"; 1931-1989	Niccolò Pignatelli d'Aragona, 19th Duke of Monteleone, "16th Marquess of the Valley of Oaxaca" b. 1923	Álvaro de Llanza, 15th Marquess of the Valley of Oaxaca b. 1960
Prince Diego Pignatelli d'Aragona b. 1958	Claudia de Llanza y López-Quesada b. 1990
