= Martín Cortés (son of Malinche) =

Son of Hernán Cortés and La Malinche

- Born: c. 1522; Mexico City, New Spain
- Died: c. 1569 (aged 46–47); Spain
- Other name: El Mestizo
- Citizenship: Spanish
- Spouse: Bernaldina de Porras
- Children: Ana and Fernando
- Parent(s): Hernán Cortés (father); La Malinche (mother)

Martín Cortés (Spanish pronunciation: [maɾˈtiŋ koɾˈtes]; c. 1522 – c. 1569) was a Spanish noble and soldier. He was the first-born son of conquistador Hernán Cortés and La Malinche, the indigenous interpreter and mistress of his father. He is considered to be one of the first mestizos of New Spain and is known as "El Mestizo" (Spanish pronunciation: [el mesˈtiθo]). He was recognized by his father, and was legitimized in 1529 by a bull of Pope Clement VII (along with his siblings Catalina and Luis).

By influence of his father, he lived a cosmopolitan life between America and Europe. He became Knight of the Order of Santiago, the highest status that could be achieved in Spain, and received a first level education in the Spanish court, where he became a page for Holy Roman Empress Isabella and future king Philip II of Spain.

He served in several military campaigns for Emperor Charles V, including the Schmalkaldic War and the last Italian War. In 1566 he and his brothers were arrested in their return to New Spain, accused of rebellion, probably falsely so. They were tortured and exiled to Spain before being exonerated by King Philip. He then served under John of Austria and participated in suppressing the Second Alpujarras Rebellion, where he was killed in action in 1569.

== Early life ==
Martín Cortés was born in 1522 in a former Aztec palace of Mexico City, New Spain, and his father named him after Martín's own grandfather. When Martín was only two years old, his parents led an expedition to Honduras and left him in the care of Juan Altamirano, a cousin of his father. In 1526, when Martín was four, his mother married Juan Jaramillo, a trusted lieutenant of his father, although "his father never seemed to cast her aside." His father continued to leave him in the custody of Altamirano since that was the home that he had known best. Two years later, he saw his mother one last time before his father took him to Spain. He probably had time to learn some Náhuatl.

== First tenure in Spain ==
Hernán and Martín arrived in the harbor of Palos de la Frontera in May 1528. In June, Cortés took Martín on his journey to meet the emperor, Charles V. This proved to be a difficult task however; according to a letter written two years after this meeting, Cortés writes, "After I kissed your majesty's hands in Barcelona", which implies that Cortés met the king in Barcelona.

In 1529, Hernán Cortés hired a lawyer to petition Pope Clement VII to legitimize Martín. The pope agreed since he himself had been illegitimate. Martín was inducted into the Order of Santiago on July 19, backed by fellow conquistador Diego de Ordaz, and became a page under Empress Isabella and Prince Philip.

In 1532, Hernán Cortés had another son, this time with his aristocratic second wife, Spanish aristocrat, Doña Juana de Zúñiga. He also named this son Martín after his father, but this son had the aristocratic title of don, a marker that anyone holding it kept from cradle to grave. In October of the same year his half-brother Don Martín was born, Martín fell ill. According to letters between Hernán Cortés and his cousin, Francisco de Núñez, he was suffering from lamparones, a disease that was called "the king's evil" because some thought that the king could cure it.".

In the spring of 1540, Cortés returned to Spain for the last time; this was the first time that the eighteen year old Martín Cortés the Mestizo and the eight year old Don Martín Cortés met. The following year, Cortés volunteered into the Algiers expedition, taking along his sons Luis and Martín el Mestizo, while leaving Martín in Spain due to his youth. The expedition was wrecked by storms, but the family managed to survive. The failure, however, probably only reinforced el Mestizo's will to start a military career. In 1546 he was serving in Lombardy and Piedmont in the last phase of the Italian War, and later in the Schmalkaldic War, participating in April in the Battle of Muhlberg.

== Death of Hernán Cortés and adulthood in Spain ==
On December 2, 1547, his father died in Castile, Spain, with all sons present. Although he was the eldest son, the primary legitimate heir was his younger half brother, Martín Cortés Zuñiga, who inherited the title of the Marquis of the Valley of Oaxaca. In turn, Martín el Mestizo was to receive an annual income of one thousand gold ducats from the marquisate.

As part of the entourage of Prince Philip, Martín probably traveled to England with him in 1554 during his grand wedding to Queen Mary I. His brother was also a guest, as recorded by William Segar. Three years later, he served in the Italian War of 1551–1559, participating in the Battle of St. Quentin. In 1557, Martín Cortés hired a lawyer to sue his brother for certain mines and slaves that were granted to him by his father 8 years before his death. This was a battle that lasted until 1561, when the Mestizo was finally granted his part. During the process of this battle, Spain passed the New Laws that said that every slave in New Spain was free. Despite this clash, the two brothers mended their relationship.

== Return to Mexico ==
In September 1562, after a terrible voyage, Cortés and his two half brothers, the other Martín and Luis, arrived into the port of San Francisco de Campeche. At the end of January 1562, they sailed toward Vera Cruz, the city their father had founded a mere 44 years prior. By February, the Cortés brothers had finally arrived at Mexico city. Being the legitimate heir of Hernán Cortés, his half brother Don Martín Cortés Zuñiga was now the Marquis of the Valley of Oaxaca, and spent much of his time throwing great parties and hunting trips. The Mestizo, less inclined to partying, visited his half-sister María, daughter of Malinche, who died shortly after. He also fell ill, although he survived.

In 1562, during the indigenous revolts for the new taxes imposed by visitador Jerónimo de Valderrama, Martín Cortés was appointed alguacil mayor of Ciudad de México on December 31, replacing Juan de Sámano. His job, in which he was supported by his brother Martín, entailed both justice and law enforcement, which he carried on with harshness, leading urban patrols formed by peninsulars and mestizos. He likely capitalized on his parents' prestige among the natives. In July 1564, he left the job, which was taken by Sámano again.

In 1566, news arrived in Mexico that the leyes de encomienda or encomienda laws that changed the encomienda system said that at the death of the encomendero, all his properties would belong to the government and not the family of the deceased. In March 1566, Brothers Gil and Alonso de Ávila held a party at their home in Mexico. This was the spot where what would become known as the "marquis plot" supposedly occurred. The brothers had dressed as Mexican chieftains and paid homage to someone dressed as Hernán Cortés. To the Cortés brothers and their friends, this was simply a party stunt. However, the Spanish court in New Spain saw it as a veiled sign of an attempt to overthrow them.

The Real Hacienda denounced the acts to the Viceroy as a direct attack upon King Philip II, and the conspirators were arrested. Amongst those arrested were Cortés's three sons. Several members of the conspiracy were executed. A few days later, the Viceroy Gastón de Peralta intervened directly and released Cortés's three sons.

On 16 July 1566, guards came to arrest Martín Cortés and bring him to the royal houses. He learned that his brothers, the Ávila brothers, and eighteen other friends had been taken prisoner too. They were being charged with plotting to anoint the Marquis of the Valley of Oaxaca as the king of New Spain. He was brought before the judge on the day of his arrest, three days after having been questioned, he sent the judge a petition asking him to either charge him with something or let him go, but nothing happened. Six days later, he tried again, and once again, nothing happened. Finally, thirteen days later, he was charged with having known for ten or eleven months that his brother and other people in his close circle were charged with planning a rebellion and uprising against His Majesty. Alfonso de Ávila and his brother were both publicly beheaded, and in September 1566, the first Cortés brother, Luis, was sentenced to death by beheading.

However, before this could happen, a new viceroy, the Marqués de Falces, arrived in Vera Cruz on 15 November 1567. He allowed both of Martín's brothers to leave New Spain and for Luis to go serve time in a colony near Algeria while Martín was allowed to plead his case before the king. However, Martín, Malinche's son, stayed in Mexico.

On 7 January 1568, Martín was subjected to torture and was sentenced to indefinite exile in Spain. His torturer was reproached by King Philip II personally, sent back to Spain, and found dead in his room one day after having met with the king. After being exiled from his father's land and his birthplace, he served under Don Juan de Austria, an illegitimate son of Charles V. In 1574, the king exonerated all sons of Hernán Cortés, and offered condolences to their wrongful mistreatments.

Martín never returned to Mexico. In 1569, he engaged in the suppression of Second Alpujarras Rebellion in the ranks of Juan de Austria, where he was killed in action later into the year. He left two children with Doña Bernaldina de Porras: a daughter, Ana Cortés, and a son, Fernando Cortés. Details and dates of Martín's family life do not exist.

== See also ==
- Hernán Cortés
- Martín Cortés, 2nd Marqués del Valle de Oaxaca
