= Martín Cortés, 2nd Marquess of the Valley of Oaxaca =

Spanish noble, son of Hernán Cortes

Don Martín Cortés y Zúñiga, 2nd Marquess of the Valley of Oaxaca (1532 – 13 August 1589) was the son and designated heir of Spanish conquistador Hernán Cortés by his second wife, Doña Juana de Zúñiga. Don Martín shared his name with an elder half-brother, whose mother was Doña Marina. He was involved with a conspiracy of encomenderos, was investigated, tried, and spared the death penalty.

== Early life ==
Cortés was born in Cuernavaca in what is now the state of Morelos. He had an older half-brother with the same name Martín Cortés (1523–1568), son of Hernán Cortés and Doña Marina ("La Malinche"), nicknamed "El Mestizo". Illegitimate by birth, Doña Marina's son Martín lacked the noble title of don, which his younger, legitimate half-brother held. Don Martín also had three sisters: Doña María Cortés y Zúñiga, Doña Catalina Cortés y Zúñiga, and Doña Juana Cortés y Zúñiga.

According to one modern assessment, "Martín Cortés was everything his father was not.... In place of courage, diplomatic genius, and a talent for leadership, [Don] Martín faced with a straightforward arrogance that he claimed as his birthright."

Don Martín and his brother, Don Luis, traveled with their father to Spain in 1540, to serve King Charles I of Spain and his successor, Philip II of Spain. As a young man, Don Martín became friends with Prince Philip, and both participated in the campaign against the rebellious Low Countries. Through his friendship with Prince Philip, who became Philip II following his father's abdication, Don Martín gained security of title to his estates in New Spain, who "commanded that all the estates and Indian tributaries granted to Hernán Cortés in recognition of his conquests be passed on to his son."

== Career ==
During his residence in Spain, he married his cousin, Doña Ana Ramírez de Arellano, daughter of the Count of Aguilar, Don Pedro Ramírez de Arellano. He maintained close ties with the aristocracy and intelligentsia of the moment, such as the writer Francisco López de Gómara, whom he sponsored to write the biography of his father.

=== Return to New Spain ===
Don Martín, along with brother Don Luis and half brother Martín el Mestizo, returned to New Spain in 1563, met by "raucous welcoming parties", particularly of disgruntled encomenderos, and he was met by the viceroy himself, Don Luis de Velasco. At the time, during a period of disturbances in the city of Mexico City, Don Martín was the richest person in New Spain, with many encomiendas in various parts of New Spain as well as the entailed estate as Marquess of the Valley of Oaxaca. In Francisco López de Gómara's dedication of his biography of Cortés to its sponsor, Don Martín, he says to the young Marquess in admonition that "in the first instance you have wealth; in the second, fame, for honor and riches go hand in hand. At the same time your inheritance obligates you to emulate the deeds of your father, Hernán Cortés, and to spend well what he left you."

=== Conflicts with elite ===
In "los Países Bajos" (the Spanish Netherlands), Martín had acquired the "bad habit" of toasting. This offended some elites' sense of good manners in New Spain. However, more severe than this breach of etiquette was his attempt to be considered the most important man in New Spain instead of the crown's appointed viceroy. He hijacked the visit of a royal inspector, Jerónimo de Valderrama, who, under normal protocols, would have been met by the viceroy and stayed in the viceregal palace. The welcoming party greeted Valderrama first and persuaded him to stay with him rather than with the viceroy.

Although that might seem trivial, it was a strong signal that he was challenging the viceroy's power.

=== Encomenderos' Conspiracy ===
He led a movement along with some encomenderos to prevent the abolition of encomiendas that was mandated by the New Laws of 1542 (they were rumored to be about to come into effect soon) as well as greater autonomy for the New Spain. From the encomenderos' point of view, they were the heirs of the conquerors who had given the Crown the rich and vast territory and so they sought to retain what they considered their just rewards for service with their encomienda grants. The Crown was increasingly opposed to the development of a noble group that challenged its power and perquisites, and the New Laws that limited the inheritance of encomiendas was a mechanism to phase out the sources of wealth and power for the conqueror group.

In New Spain, on the death of the Viceroy Don Luís de Velasco in 1564, Don Martín was named Captain General by the Mexico City Council, with hints of independence for the viceroyalty. In 1565, two sons of an important conqueror seemed to go beyond merely advocating protection of the conqueror group's interests and offered to raise rebellion and crown Don Martín king of New Spain. According to contemporary observer Juan Suárez de Peralta (a relative of Hernán Cortés' late first wife, Catalina Suárez), Don Martín was not all in with the conspirators but did not discourage them. Don Martín's vacillation caused the plot to be first postponed and then abandoned. On 16 July 1566, the plotters were betrayed and the leaders arrested, including Don Martín, his brothers, and the rich and influential Alonso de Ávila, nephew of the conquistador of the same name. The two main conspirators were sentenced to death and beheaded.

In Don Martín's trial, he was accused of treason and inciting rebellion against the king. According to the trial questionnaires, of which 388 leaves are found in the Harkness Collection of the Library of Congress (and published in transcription and English translation), he was accused of seeking to overturn the audencia (high court) and its judges be assassinated, and he would become king of New Spain. The questionnaires for the trial were drawn up in September 1566 and another in November. There were powerful witnesses testifying to his participation in the plot, including the brother and son of Luis de Velasco. Testifying for the defense were the Provincial for the Augustinian Order and two Provincials of the Franciscan Order, but there was a range of supporters, including two musicians, a surgeon, a lawyer, a silversmith, the son and wife of an apothecary, and a free black woman named Margarida Pérez.

The monarch sent a judge, Alonso de Muñoz, and to deal with the perceived threat to the colony. Muñoz "unleashed a reign of terror. Hundreds of Spanish settlers were arrested and tortured and scores beheaded." Muñoz was recalled to Spain and thrown into prison. on arrival of the new viceroy, Don Gastón de Peralta, on 15 November 1567. The Cortés brothers were spared death. The failed encomenderos' conspiracy and aftermath was the end of effective power of the group.

Don Martín, who had been spared beheading, was given leave in April 1567 to travel to Spain to plead their case before the King, with whom he had been friends since before his ascendance to the throne. Before he left New Spain, he had been required to swear allegiance to the crown and to present himself in Spain to the king within 50 days of his arrival. Don Martín was under house arrest briefly, but promising not to return to New Spain, he was released and resumed his profligate life in Madrid, funded by his vast wealth.

He had briefly lost the entailed Estate until 1574.

=== Later years ===
Given his exile in Spain, he had to rely on able administrators to run the sprawling estates of the Marquessate of the Valley of Oaxaca. The position of administrator (the "governor") was leased to the highest bidder for nine years, which guaranteed him income and in exchange, the governor had considerable power over virtually all aspects of the estate: administrative, fiscal, and judicial. As with the estates of the Jesuits in New Spain, the Marquesado was administered as a unit despite the scattered individual haciendas in central and southern Mexico. They were business enterprises run for profit. The administrators handled all matters pertaining to the estate. A codex held by the Latin American Library at Tulane University, the "Atatepec Land Claim [Petition to recover a tract of land from the marques]," describes litigation against him.

== Personal life ==
While in Spain, he married his cousin, Doña Ana Ramírez de Arellano (1533–1578), daughter of the Count of Aguilar, Don Pedro Ramírez de Arellano. Together, they were the parents of the following children:

- Ángela Cortés Ramírez de Arellano (1553–1588), who married Luis de Benavides y Zúñiga, 3rd Marquess of Frómista.
- Juana Cortés Ramírez de Arellano (1560–1628), who married Pedro Carrillo de Mendoza, 9th Count of Priego, mother of the 5th Marchioness of the Valley of Oaxaca.
- Fernando Cortés Ramírez de Arellano (1563–1602), 3rd Marquess of the Valley of Oaxaca, no issue.
- Pedro Cortés Ramírez de Arellano (1565–1629), 4th Marquess of the Valley of Oaxaca, no issue.

He died in Madrid, Spain, 13 August 1589, the 68th anniversary of the fall of Tenochtitlan. His successors to the title never resided in Mexico but lived in Spain and later Italy.

=== Descendants ===
Through his daughter Juana, he was a grandfather of Doña Estefanía Carrillo de Mendoza y Cortés, 5th Marchioness of the Valley of Oaxaca (c. 1578–1635), who married Diego de Aragón, 4th Duke of Terranova. They were the parents of one child, Giovanna Tagliavia d'Aragona, 6th Marchioness of the Valley of Oaxaca, 5th Duchess of Terranova (1619–1692), who married Ettore Pignatelli, 4th Prince of Noia, 5th Duke of Monteleóne.

Spanish nobility
Preceded by Hernán Cortés	Marquess of the Valley of Oaxaca; 1547–1589	Succeeded by Fernando Cortés
