= Giulio Pignatelli, 2nd Prince of Noia =

Italian aristocrat (1587-1658)

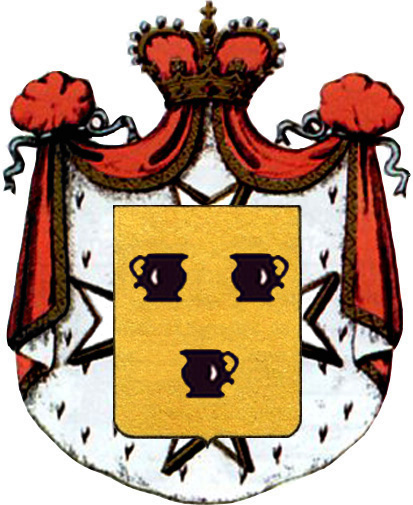
Coat of arms of the Prince of Noia

Giulio Pignatelli, 2nd Prince of Noia, 4th Marquess of Cerchiara (17 March 1587 – 10 March 1658) was an Italian aristocrat.

== Early life ==
He was born in Naples on 17 March 1587 into the House of Pignatelli, one of the most aristocratic families of the Kingdom of Naples, which had included several Viceroys and ministers of the crown. He was the eldest son of Fabrizio Pignatelli, 1st Prince of Noia (1568–1627) and Violante di Sangro (1567–1642). Among his younger siblings were Giacomo Pignatelli, Duke of Bellosguardo (who married Fiorentina Vaaz d'Andrada), and Domenico Pignatelli (who married Giustinia, Marchioness of San Vicenzo).

His paternal grandparents were Giulio Pignatelli, 2nd Marquess of Cerchiara, and Giovanna Spinelli. His grandfather, the 2nd Marquess of Cerchiara, was the uncle of Francesco Pignatelli, 4th Marquess of Spinazzola (himself the father of Antonio Pignatelli, who became Pope Innocent XII in 1691). Through his brother Giacomo, he was uncle to Fabrizio Pignatelli, 2nd Duke of Bellosguardo. (Note: Giulio's nephew, Fabrizio Pignatelli, 2nd Duke of Bellosguardo (1625–1676), was the father of Giacomo Pignatelli, 3rd Duke of Bellosguardo (himself the grandfather of Margherita Pignatelli, 5th Duchess of Bellosguardo, who married Diego Pignatelli, 7th Prince of Noia (parents of Fabrizio Pignatelli, 8th Prince of Noia, who married Costanza de' Medici, and grandparents of Ettore Pignatelli, 9th Prince of Noia and Cardinal Francesco Maria Pignatelli).) Through his brother Domenico, he was uncle to Maria Anna Giuseppina Pignatelli (wife of Count Johann Michael von Althann, the favorite of Emperor Charles VI). His maternal grandparents were Giovanni Francesco di Sangro, 1st Prince of Sansevero and Andreana Carafa.

== Career ==
Upon the death of his father in 1627, he became the 2nd Prince of Noia and the 4th Marquess of Cerchiara (named after Cerchiara di Calabria, a town in the province of Cosenza, part of the Calabria region of southern Italy).

== Personal life ==
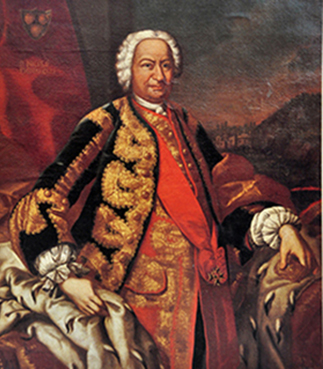
His son, Niccolò, the Viceroy of Sicily

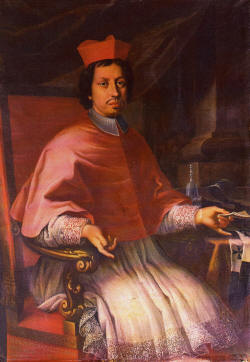
His youngest son, Cardinal Francesco Pignatelli, c. 1703

His first marriage was on 29 March 1601, in Naples, to Zenobia Pignatelli (1580–1625), a daughter of Giacomo Pignatelli, Lord of Castellaneta, and Ippolita Caracciolo. Her sister, Eleonora Pignatelli, was the wife of Carlo d'Aquino, 1st Prince of Castiglione. Before her death in 1625, they were the parents of:

- Fabrizio Pignatelli, 3rd Prince of Noia (1604–1664), who married Girolama Pignatelli, Duchess of Monteleone, a daughter of Héctor Pignatelli y Colonna, 4th Duke of Monteleone, and Caterina Caracciolo y Mendoza (a daughter of Carlo Caracciolo, 6th Count of Sant'Angelo).
- Aniello Pignatelli, 1st Prince of Montecorvino (1622–1694), who married Giovanna Brancia, 1st Duchess of San Mauro, a daughter of Francesco Brancia, Marquess of Paduli and Santo Mauro and Ippolita Carbone.

His second marriage was in 1626 to Cenovia di Capua (1580–1630). She died in 1630.

His third marriage was on 5 September 1630 in Naples to Clarice di Capua (1602–1637), a daughter of Vincenzo di Capua, 1st Prince of Riccia, and Giovanna Carafa (a daughter of Fernando II Carafa, 4th Duke of Nochera, and sister to Francesco Maria Carafa, 5th Duke of Nochera). Clarice had previously been married to, and widowed from, Ferdinando di Capua, 6th Duke of Termoli (who died in 1623) and Francesco Filomarino, 2nd Prince of Rocca d'Aspro.

On 27 March 1638 he was married for the fourth, and final, time to Beatrice Carafa (1610–1679) in Naples. The widow of Carlo Carafa, 4th Marquess of Anzi, she was the daughter of Giovanni Alfonso Carafa, 2nd Duke of Noia and Giulia Cecilia de Lannoy, 4th Duchess of Boiano (a descendant of Charles de Lannoy, 1st Prince of Sulmona). From her marriage to the Marquess of Anzi, she was the mother of Francesco Maria Carafa, 2nd Prince of Belvedere. (Note: The Prince of Noia's stepson, Francesco Carafa, 2nd Prince of Belvedere (d. 1711), was the father of Carlo Carafa, 3rd Prince of Belvedere (1674–1706), who married Elisabeth van den Eynde (daughter of Ferdinand van den Eynde, 1st Marquess of Castelnuovo, in 1688); and Cardinal Pier Luigi Carafa (1677–1755).) Before his death in 1658, they were the parents of:

- Giustiniana Pignatelli (b. 1638), who married Carlo Spinelli, 3rd Prince of San Giorgio, son of Pier Giovanni Spinelli, 2nd Prince of San Giorgio and Beatrice Spinelli (a daughter of Tommaso Francesco Spinelli, 3rd Marquess of Fuscaldo).
- Niccolò Pignatelli, 8th Duke of Monteleone (1648–1730), who married Giovanna Pignatelli de Aragón, 6th Princess of Noia (1666–1723), a daughter of Fabrizio Pignatelli, 5th Prince of Noia, and Teresa Antonia Pimentel y Benavides (a daughter of Antonio Alonso Pimentel y Quiñones, 6th Duke of Benavente).
- Francesco Pignatelli (1652–1734), a Cardinal who was nearly elected Pope in 1721, but Spain vetoed his candidature.

=== Descendants ===
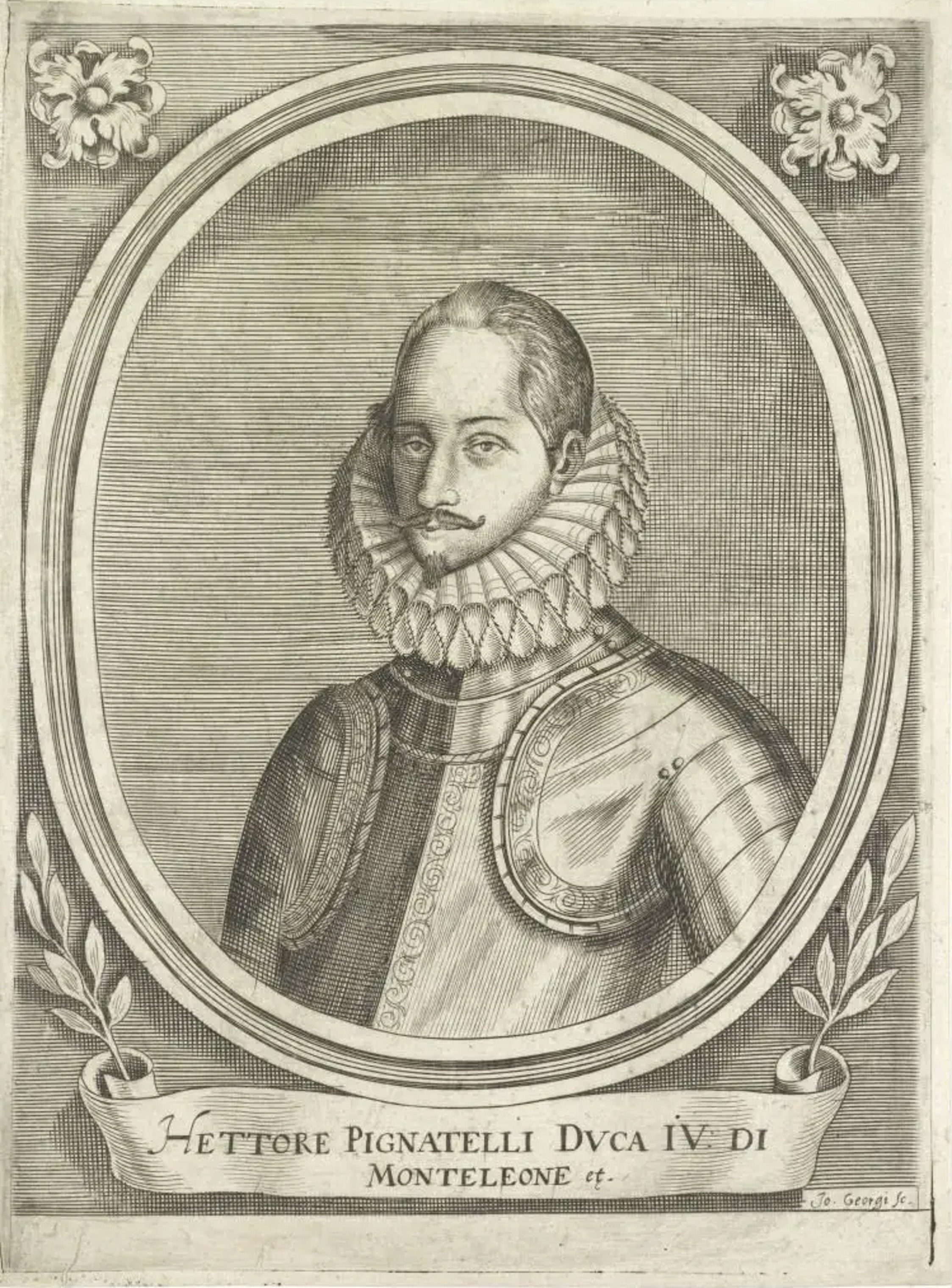
His grandson, Ettore Pignatelli, 4th Prince of Noia

Through his son Fabrizio, he was a grandfather of Ettore Pignatelli, 4th Prince of Noia (1620–1674), who succeeded to the princely title and his maternal grandfather's title as the 5th Duke of Monteleone. (Note: Ettore Pignatelli, 4th Prince of Noia (1620–1674) was the father of Fabrizio Pignatelli, 5th Prince of Noia (1640–1677), who married Giovanna "Juana" Tagliavia d'Aragona Cortés (1619–1692), heiress of vast conquistador estates in Mexico, in 1639. After which the family used the surname, "Aragona Pignatelli Cortés" for all their descendants, who were, however, generally known as "Pignatelli d'Aragona".)

Through his son Aniello, he was a grandfather of Ferdinando Pignatelli, 3rd Prince of Montecorvino (1654–1729). (Note: Ferdinando Pignatelli, 3rd Prince of Montecorvino (1654–1729) was the father of Emanuela Pignatelli, 4th Princess of Montecorvino (1702–1775), who married Giovanni Battista Pignatelli, 2nd Prince of Marsiconovo.)

Through his daughter Giustiniana, he was a grandfather of Giulio Spinelli, 4th Prince of San Giorgio (1657–1683).

Through his son Niccolò, he was a grandfather of Maria Theresia Pignatelli de Aragon (who married Jean Philippe Eugène de Mérode), Stefania Pignatelli de Aragon (who married Giuseppe Sanseverino, 10th Prince of Bisignano), Diego Pignatelli de Aragon, 7th Prince of Noia (who married Anna Maria Caracciolo and Margherita Pignatelli, 5th Duchess of Bellosguardo), Fernando Pignatelli de Aragon, Prince of Strongoli (who married Lucrezia Pignatelli), Caterina Pignatelli de Aragon (who married Alfonso IV de Cárdenas, 8th Count of Acerra), Maria Rosa Pignatelli de Aragon (who married Francesco Spinelli, 7th Prince of Scalea), Antonio Pignatelli de Aragon (who married Francisca de Moncayo y Blanes, 4th Marchioness of Coscojuela), and Fabrizio Pignatelli de Aragon, Prince of Cerchiara (who married Virginia Pignatelli, a daughter of Girolamo Pignatelli, Prince of Strongoli).
