= Niccolò Pignatelli, Duke of Monteleone =

Italian aristocrat (1648-1730)

Don Niccolò Pignatelli 8th Duke of Monteleone
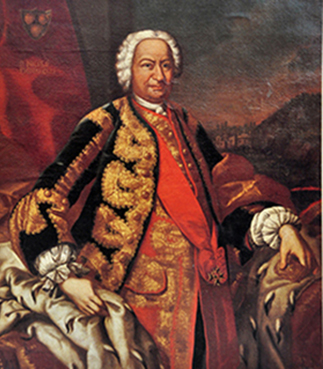

Viceroy of Sicily
- In office 1718–1719
- Preceded by: Juan Francisco de Bette, 3rd Marquis of Lede
- Succeeded by: Cardinal Marquis of Almenara (in 1722)

Personal details
- Born: 22 August 1648 Palermo
- Died: 7 March 1730 (aged 81) Cerchiara di Calabria
- Spouse: Giovanna Pignatelli de Aragón
- Relations: Pope Innocent XII (uncle); Francesco Pignatelli (brother)
- Parent(s): Giulio Pignatelli, 2nd Prince of Noia; Beatrice Carafa

Niccolò Pignatelli, Duke of Monteleone (22 August 1648 – 7 March 1730), was an Italian aristocrat who served as Viceroy of Sicily under the House of Savoy.

== Early life ==
Pignatelli was born on 22 August 1648 in Palermo into the Neapolitan noble House of Pignatelli. He was the son of Giulio Pignatelli, 2nd Prince of Noia (1587–1658) and, his fourth wife, Beatrice Carafa (1610–1679). He was the brother of Giustiniana Pignatelli, who married Carlo Spinelli, 3rd Prince of San Giorgio, and Cardinal Francesco Pignatelli (who was nearly Pope in 1721 but Spain vetoed his candidature). From his father's previous marriages to Zenobia Pignatelli (a daughter of Giacomo Pignatelli) and Clarice di Capua (a daughter of Vincenzo di Capua, 1st Prince of Riccia), he was also a half-brother to Fabrizio Pignatelli, 3rd Prince of Noia, (Note: Through his eldest brother, Fabrizio Pignatelli, 3rd Prince of Noia (1604–1664), he was uncle to Ettore Pignatelli, 4th Prince of Noia (1620–1674), the father of Fabrizio Pignatelli, 5th Prince of Noia (1640–1677), who was also Niccolò's father-in-law.) and Aniello Pignatelli, 1st Prince of Montecorvino. (Note: Through another elder half-brother, Aniello Pignatelli, 1st Prince of Montecorvino (1622–1694), he was uncle to Ferdinando Pignatelli, 3rd Prince of Montecorvino (1654–1729), the father of Emanuela Pignatelli, 4th Princess of Montecorvino (1702–1775), who married Giovanni Battista Pignatelli, 2nd Prince of Marsiconovo.) From his mother's marriage to Carlo Carafa, 4th Marquess of Anzi, he was a half-brother to Francesco Maria Carafa, 2nd Prince of Belvedere. (Note: Through his elder half-brother, Francesco Carafa, 2nd Prince of Belvedere (d. 1711), he was uncle to Carlo Carafa, 3rd Prince of Belvedere (1674–1706), who married Elisabeth van den Eynde (daughter of Ferdinand van den Eynde, 1st Marquess of Castelnuovo, in 1688); and Cardinal Pier Luigi Carafa (1677–1755).)

A nephew of Pope Innocent XII, his paternal grandparents were Fabrizio Pignatelli, 1st Prince of Noia and Violante di Sangro. His maternal grandparents were Giovanni Alfonso Carafa, 2nd Duke of Noia and Giulia Cecilia de Lannoy, 4th Duchess of Boiano (a descendant of Charles de Lannoy, 1st Prince of Sulmona).

== Career ==
The Spanish invaded the Kingdom in 1718 during the War of the Quadruple Alliance. Pignatelli succeeded Juan Francisco de Bette, 3rd Marquis of Lede (who led a successful expedition to lift the Siege of Ceuta by Sultan Moulay Ismail in 1720) as the Viceroy of Sicily in 1719. The Duke of Savoy ceded it to Austria in 1720 by the Treaty of The Hague.

== Personal life ==
He married Giovanna Pignatelli de Aragón, suo jure 6th Princess of Noia and 8th Duchess of Monteleone (1666–1723), a daughter of Fabrizio Pignatelli, 5th Prince of Noia, and Teresa Antonia Pimentel y Benavides (a daughter of Antonio Alonso Pimentel y Quiñones, 6th Duke of Benavente). After their marriage, he was entitled to use the title Duke of Monteleone. Together, they were the parents of: Antonio

- Maria Theresia Pignatelli de Aragon (1682–1718), who married Jean Philippe Eugène de Mérode, 5th Marquess of Westerloo.
- Stefania Pignatelli de Aragon (1683–1728), who married Giuseppe Sanseverino, 10th Prince of Bisignano.
- Diego Pignatelli de Aragon, 7th Prince of Noia (1687–1750), who married Anna Maria Caracciolo, a daughter of Marino Francesco Caracciolo, 5th Prince of Avellino, and Antonia Spinola y Colonna. After her death in 1715, he married Margherita Pignatelli, 5th Duchess of Bellosguardo, a daughter of Giacomo Pignatelli, 3rd Duke of Bellosguardo and half sister of Francesco Caracciolo, 3rd Duke of Miranda.
- Fernando Pignatelli de Aragon, Prince of Strongoli (1689–1767), who married Lucrezia Pignatelli, a daughter of Girolamo Pignatelli, Prince of Strongoli.
- Caterina Pignatelli de Aragon (1696–1728), who married Alfonso IV de Cárdenas, 8th Count of Acerra.
- Maria Rosa Pignatelli de Aragon (1696–1770), who married Francesco Spinelli, 7th Prince of Scalea.
- Antonio Pignatelli de Aragon (1700–1746), who married Francisca de Moncayo y Blanes, 4th Marchioness of Coscojuela.
- Fabrizio Pignatelli de Aragon, Prince of Cerchiara (1703–1736), who married Virginia Pignatelli, a daughter of Girolamo Pignatelli, Prince of Strongoli.

His wife died in Spain on 22 June 1723. Pignatelli died on 7 March 1730 at Cerchiara di Calabria.

=== Descendants ===
Through his son Fernando, he was a grandfather of Salvatore Pignatelli, 5th Prince of Strongoli (1736–1792), the father of Ferdinando Pignatelli, 6th Prince of Strongoli and Francesco Pignatelli, 7th Prince of Strongoli, 9th Count of Melissa.

Through his son Antonio, he was a grandfather of Joaquín Atanasio Pignatelli de Aragón y Moncayo, 16th Count of Fuentes and 4th Marquess of Coscojuela (1724–1776), a Grandee of Spain who served as the Spanish Ambassador to France, the United Kingdom and to the Kingdom of Sardinia.
