= Héctor de Pignatelli y Colonna =

Spanish noble

Don Héctor Pignatelli y Colonna 4th Duke of Monteleone
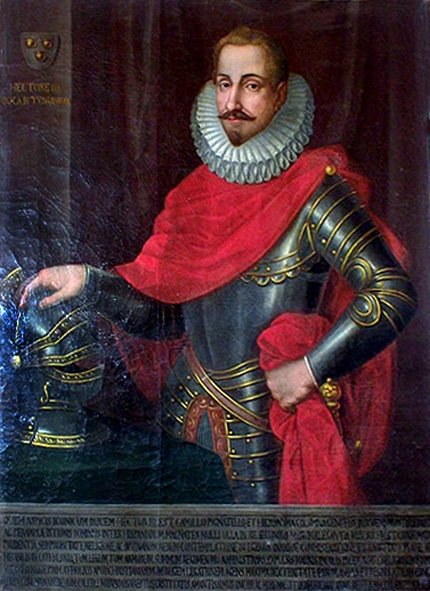

Viceroy of Catalonia
- In office 1603–1611
- Preceded by: Joan Terès i Borrull
- Succeeded by: Pedro Manrique de Lara

Personal details
- Born: 28 October 1572
- Died: 4 August 1622 (aged 49)
- Spouse: Caterina Caracciolo y Mendoza
- Children: Girolama Pignatelli y Caracciolo
- Parent(s): Camilo Pignatelli, 3rd Duke of Monteleón; Girolama Colonna

Héctor de Pignatelli y Colonna (28 October 1572 – 4 August 1622), also known as Ettore III Pignatelli, was the fourth Duke of Monteleón. He served as Viceroy of Catalonia from 1603 to 1611.

== Early life ==
Pignatelli was born on 28 October 1572. He was the son and heir of Camillo Pignatell, 3rd Duke of Monteleón (d. 1583) and Girolama Colonna y d'Aragona.

His paternal grandparents were Ettore Pignatelli, 2nd Duke of Monteleone, and, his first wife, Diana Folch de Cardona y Gonzaga (daughter of Pedro Folch de Cardona, 3rd Count of Colisano, and Susanna Gonzaga). His maternal grandparents were Ascanio Colonna di Paliano, 1st Count of Tagliacozzo (1500–1557) and Giovanna d'Aragona. Monteleón's paternal grandfather was the nephew and heir of the same named Ettore Pignatelli, 1st Duke of Monteleone, who had been viceroy of Sicily from 1517 to 1534, had been elevated to the title of "Duke of Monteleone" (Note: Monteleone refers to the village of Monteleone di Calabria, now Vibo Valentia.) by Emperor Charles V, on 29 March 1527.

== Career ==
Upon the death of his father in 1583, when he was only nine years old, he inherited the Duchy of Monteleón.

He served as the Viceroy of Catalonia from 1603 to 1611 who in 1610 took the decision to expel the Moriscos born and living in Spain who were not willing to relinquish their Islamic faith.

== Personal life ==
Monteleón married Caterina Caracciolo y Mendoza, a daughter of Carlo Caracciolo, 6th Count of Sant'Angelo, and Ana de Mendoza, but they had no sons.

- Girolama Pignatelli y Caracciolo (1599–1667), who married Fabrizio Pignatelli, 3rd Prince of Noia, eldest son of Giulio Pignatelli, 2nd Prince of Noia and, his first wife, Zenobia Pignatelli. Among Fabrizio's much younger half-siblings (from the 2nd Prince's fourth wife) were Niccolò Pignatelli, 8th Duke of Monteleone, and Cardinal Francesco Pignatelli, who was nearly elected Pope in 1721, but Spain vetoed his candidature.

Upon his death on 4 August 1622, he was succeeded by his daughter, Girolama, who became Duchess of Monteleone. In due course, Girolama passed her father's ducal title on to her son Ettore, who became 5th Duke of Monteleone and 4th Prince of Noia.

=== Descendants ===
Through his daughter Girolama, he was a grandfather of Ettore Pignatelli, 4th Prince of Noia (1620–1674), who married the heiress Giovanna "Juana" Tagliavia d'Aragona Cortés, Princess of Castelvetrano, and Duchess of Terranova, after which the family used the surname, "Aragona Pignatelli Cortés" for all their descendants, who were, however, generally known as "Pignatelli d'Aragona". (Note: Through Héctor's grandson, Ettore Pignatelli, 4th Prince of Noia (1620–1674), he was a great-grandfather of Fabrizio Pignatelli, 5th Prince of Noia (1640–1677), who was himself the father of Giovanna Pignatelli de Aragón, 6th Princess of Noia (1666–1723), who married Niccolò Pignatelli, 8th Duke of Monteleone (a younger half-brother of Fabrizio Pignatelli, 3rd Prince of Noia).)

== Legacy ==
The 15th-century chronicle Diurnali del duca di Monteleone is named after a manuscript he once owned.

== Bibliography ==
- Mariela Fargas Peñarrocha, "Héctor Pignatelli y Colonna", Diccionario Biográfico Español (2018).

Preceded by Joan Terès i Borrull	Viceroy of Catalonia; 1603–1611	Succeeded by Pedro Manrique
