= Ettore Pignatelli =

Ettore Pignatelli (Italian) or Héctor Pignatelli (Spanish) may refer to:

- Ettore Pignatelli, 1st Duke of Monteleone (c. 1465 – 1535)
- Héctor de Pignatelli y Colonna, Duque de Monteleón (1572–1622), Duke of Monteleone
- Ettore Pignatelli IV (1620–1674), known as Héctor Pignatelli de Aragón y Cortés
