= Ettore Pignatelli, 4th Prince of Noia =

Italian nobleman (1620-1674)

Ettore Pignatelli, 4th Prince of Noia, 5th Duke of Monteleóne (17 June 1620 – 8 March 1674) was an Italian nobleman.

== Early life ==
Pignatelli was born on 17 June 1620 at Senise, Basilicata in Southern Italy, into the House of Pignatelli, one of the most aristocratic families of the Kingdom of Naples. He was a younger son of Fabrizio Pignatelli, 3rd Prince of Noia (1604–1664) and Girolama Pignatelli, Duchess of Monteleóne (1599–1667). His elder brother was Giulio Pignatelli, Duke of Terranova (who married Giulia Mastrantonio Bardi), who died without issue.

His paternal grandparents were Giulio Pignatelli, 2nd Prince of Noia, and, his first wife, Zenobia Pignatelli (a daughter of Giacomo Pignatelli, Lord of Castellaneta). From his grandfather's fourth marriage in 1638 to Beatrice Carafa, his paternal uncles (although nearly two decades younger than Ettore) were Niccolò Pignatelli, Duke of Monteleone, and Cardinal Francesco Pignatelli, who was nearly elected Pope in 1721, but Spain vetoed his candidature. His maternal grandparents were Héctor Pignatelli y Colonna, 4th Duke of Monteleone, and Caterina Caracciolo (a daughter of Carlo Caracciolo, 6th Count of Sant'Angelo).

== Career ==
Upon the death of his father in 1664, he succeeded as the 4th Prince of Noia. From his mother, he inherited her family's title, becoming the 5th Duke of Monteleóne.

== Personal life ==
In 1639, Ettore was married to one of the richest heiresses of her time, Giovanna "Juana" Tagliavia d'Aragona Cortés, 6th Marchioness of the Valley of Oaxaca, 5th Duchess of Terranova (1619–1692), the daughter of Diego Tagliavia d'Aragona, 4th Duke of Terranova, and Doña Estefanía de Mendoza Cortés, 5th Marchioness del Valle de Oaxaca. (Note: Doña Estefanía Carrillo de Mendoza y Cortés, Duchess of Terranova (c. 1635–1653), was the eldest daughter of the elder daughter of Martín Cortés, 2nd Marquess of the Valley of Oaxaca.) Juana was the heiress of vast conquistador estates in Mexico. After their marriage and per the requirements of the entailment, the family used the surname, "Aragona Pignatelli Cortés" for all their descendants, who were, however, generally known as "Pignatelli d'Aragona". Together, they were the parents of the following children who survived to adulthood:

- Fabrizio Pignatelli d'Aragon, 5th Prince of Noia (1640–1677), who married Teresa Antonia Pimentel, a daughter of Alonso Antonio Pimentel de Quiñones, 8th Duke of Benavente.
- Mariana Pignatelli d'Aragon (b. 1643), who married Jaime Francisco Sarmiento de Silva, 5th Duke of Híjar, 8th Count of Belchite, a direct descendant of Juan Francisco Fernández de Hijar.
- Geronima Pignatelli d'Aragon (1644–1711), who married Francesco Marino Caracciolo, 4th Prince of Avellino.
- Giovanna Caterina Pignatelli d'Aragon (b. 1645), who married Francesco IV Rodrigo Ventimiglia, 5th Prince of Castelbuono.
- Estefanía Pignatelli d'Aragon (b. 1667), who married Fernando de Zúñiga y Enríquez de Acevedo, 5th Duke of Peñaranda, 9th Count of Miranda.

Pignatelli died on 8 March 1674 at Madrid, in the Kingdom of Spain. Together, Ettore and Juana established a dynasty that assembled the immense wealth of the Aragonas, the Tagliavias, the Pignatellis and the Cortés, their titles and their fiefs.
