= Roman Catholic Archdiocese of Nicaea =

Latin Catholic titular see

Archdiocese of Nicaea Archidioecesis Nicaenus

Location
- Country: Turkey

Information
- Sui iuris church: Latin Church
- Established: Around 1400

Current leadership
- Pope: Francis
- Archbishop: Sede vacante

The Archdiocese of Nicaea (/naɪˈsiːə/ ny-SEE-ə; Greek: Νίκαια, romanized: Níkaia, pronounced [ˈnicea]) is a presently sede vacante titular archdiocese of the Latin Church in the Catholic Church. Historically associated with the territorial episcopal see in the Bithynian city of Nicaea (now İznik, Turkey), the city which hosted the Councils of Nicaea which resulted in multiple infallible statements and the creation of the now famous Nicene Creed which is recited at every Mass, Divine Liturgy, and Holy Qurbana.

== Bishops ==
List of titular bishops:

- Titular Archbishop Giovanni Bessarione (1437 – 1440)
- Titular Archbishop Jean di Pranga (10 Oct 1444 – 7 May 1446)
- Titular Archbishop Melchior Miguel Carneiro Leitão - (23 Jan 1555 – 1577)
- Titular Archbishop Giovanni Beltrano De Ghevara - (16 Jan 1573.01.16 – ?)
- Titular Archbishop Vincentius Quatrimanus - (13 Aug 1592 – ?)
- Titular Archbishop Bernardino Piccoli - (15 Dec 1621 – 2 Oct 1627)
- Titular Archbishop Didacus Secco - (19 Dec 1622 – Jul 1623)
- Titular Archbishop Jacobus de la Haye - (3 Mar 1653 – ?)
- Titular Archbishop Gasparo Carpegna - (16 Jun 1670 – 22 Dec 1670)
- Titular Archbishop Carlo Vaini - (19 Jan 1671 – 15 May 1679)
- Titular Archbishop Giovanni Giacomo Cavallerini - (25 Jun 1692 – 12 Dec 1695)
- Titular Archbishop Tommaso Ruffo - (7 Apr 1698 – 17 May 1706)
- Titular Archbishop Ferdinando Nuzzi - (7 Jun 1706 – 16 Dec 1715)
- Titular Archbishop Giuseppe Firrao - (2 Sep 1714– 11 Dec 1730)
- Titular Archbishop Silvio Valenti Gonzaga (18 Jun 1731 – 19 Dec 1738)
- Titular Archbishop Alberico Archinto - (30 Sep 1739 – 5 Apr 1756)
- Titular Archbishop Antonio Maria Erba-Odescalchi - (24 Sep 1759 – 19 Nov 1759)
- Titular Archbishop Cesare Alberico Lucini - (28 Jan 1760 – 19 Feb 1768)
- Titular Archbishop Filippo Sanseverino - (29 Jan 1770 – 04 Apr 1776)
- Titular Archbishop Jean-Siffrein Maury - (24 Apr 1792 – 21 Feb 1794)
- Titular Archbishop Pietro Gravina - (12 Sep 1794 – 8 Mar 1816)
- Titular Archbishop Francesco Serra Casano - (16 Mar 1818 – 3 Jul 1826)
- Titular Archbishop Luigi Amat di San Filippo e Sorso - (9 Apr 1827 – 19 May 1837)
- Titular Archbishop Raffaele Fornari - (24 Jan 1842 – 30 Sep 1850)
- Titular Archbishop Carlo Sacconi - (27 May 1851 – 27 Sep 1861)
- Titular Archbishop Giuseppe Berardi - (7 Apr 1862 – 13 Mar 1868)
- Titular Archbishop Serafino Vannutelli - (25 Jun 1869 – 14 Mar 1887)
- Titular Archbishop Luigi Galimberti - (23 May 1887 – 16 Jan 1893)
- Titular Archbishop Augusto Guidi - (18 May 1894 – 16 Mar 1900)
- Titular Archbishop Rafael Merry del Val y Zulueta - (9 Apr 1900 – 9 Nov 1903)
- Titular Archbishop Giovanni Tacci Porcelli - (17 Dec 1904 – 13 Jun 1921)
- Titular Archbishop Jules Tiberghien - (21 Nov 1921 – 3 Jan 1923)
- Titular Archbishop Giovanni Festa - (20 Jan 1923 – 18 Apr 1930)
- Titular Archbishop Giuseppe Pizzardo - (22 Apr 1930– 13 Dec 1937)
- Titular Archbishop Aldo Laghi - (28 Aug 1938 – 2 Jan 1942)
- Titular Archbishop Francesco Pascucci - (22 Apr 1943 – 30 Mar 1945)
- Titular Archbishop Martin-Marie-Stanislas Gillet - (30 Sep 1946 – 3 Sep 1951)
- Titular Archbishop Ilario Alcini - (27 Oct 1951 - 10 Apr 1976)
