= House of Pignatelli =

Neapolitan noble family

Pignatelli Italian: Casa di Pignatelli
- Italian noble family
- Country: Spain; Italy Former countries: Kingdom of Sicily; Kingdom of Naples; Kingdom of the Two Sicilies; Kingdom of Aragon; Kingdom of Italy
- Titles: Pope (non hereditary); Cardinal (non hereditary); Viceroy of Sicily (non hereditary); Prince of the Holy Roman Empire; Prince of Belmonte; Prince of Noia; Prince of Castelvetrano; Prince of Maida; Prince of Valle; Prince of Minervino; Prince of Monteroduni; Duke of Monteleone; Duke of Bellosguardo; Duke of Girifalco; Duke of Lacconia; Duke of Orta; Duke of Terranova; Marquess of Avola; Marquess of Caronia; Marquess of Favara; Marquess of Gioiosa; Marquess of Montesoro; Marquess of Spinazzola; Marquess of Cerchiara; Count of Celano; Count of Monteleone; Count of Borgetto; Baron of Casteltermini; Baron of Menfi; Baron of Sant'Angelo Muxaro; Baron of Montedoro; Baron of Belice; Baron of Pietra Belice; Baron of Birribaida; Baron of Guastanella; Baron of Baccarasi; Neapolitan Patrician

The House of Pignatelli is the name of an old and prominent Neapolitan family of Italian nobility, clergy, men of arts and sciences, whose members occupied significant positions in 18th and 19th century. The family has been regionally prominent since the 13th century. Among various titles, they held the title of Prince of the Holy Roman Empire.

== History ==
A member of the family, Antonio Pignatelli (1615-1700) was pope with the name of Pope Innocent XII. They were Princes of the Holy Roman Empire.

The lineage includes numerous cardinals, viceroys of Sicily and a saint, Giuseppe Pignatelli di Fuentes (1737–1811), canonized in 1954 by Pius XII .

The inheritances in titles and affiliations of three great European genealogies gradually flowed into the family, the Aragona, the Tagliavia and the Cortés, so much so that in the end the representatives of the family bore all four surnames: "Pignatelli Aragona Tagliavia Cortés".

== Notable members ==
- Ettore Pignatelli, 1st Duke of Monteleone (c. 1465–1535), created 1st Duke of Monteleone (today Vibo Valentia) in 1527.
- Giovanni Battista Pignatelli (c. 1525–c. 1600) sixteenth-century Italian riding master
- Héctor de Pignatelli y Colonna, 4th Duke of Monteleón (1572–1622), the viceroy of Catalonia from 1603 to 1611
- Giulio Pignatelli, 2nd Prince of Noia (1587–1658), 4th Marquess of Cerchiara
- Antonio Pignatelli, later Pope Innocent XII (1615–1700)
- Niccolò Pignatelli, 8th Duke of Monteleone (1648–1730), Viceroy of Sicily
- Francesco Pignatelli (1652–1734), Italian cardinal
- Faustina Pignatelli Carafa, Princess of Colubrano (1705–1785) Italian scientist
- Joaquín Atanasio Pignatelli de Aragón y Moncayo (1724–1776) eighteenth-century Spanish noble and ambassador to France
- Domenico Pignatelli di Belmonte (1730–1803), Italian cardinal
- Francesco Pignatelli, Marquess of Laino (1734–1812), Vicar General of Naples under Ferdinand IV of Naples
- Ettore Pignatelli, 9th Prince of Noia (1742–1800), Italian prince who was also 12th Duke of Monteleone
- Francesco Maria Pignatelli (1744–1815), Italian cardinal
- Ferdinando Maria Pignatelli (1770–1853), Italian cardinal
- Francesco Pignatelli, 7th Prince of Strongoli (1774–1853), military commander
- Giuseppe Pignatelli, 11th Prince of Noia (1795–1859), also 14th Duke of Monteleone
- Gennaro Granito Pignatelli di Belmonte (1851–1948), Italian cardinal
- Luigi Pignatelli della Leonessa (1904–1965), Italian Consul in Madrid and Lausanne
- Riccardo Pignatelli della Leonessa (1927–1985), Italian Ambassador to Algeria
- Luciana Pignatelli (1935–2008) Italian fashion icon
- Fabrizio Pignatelli della Leonessa (b. 1952), Italian Ambassador to Guatemala and Honduras; married Princess Anna Luisa Schönburg-Waldenburg

=== Cardinals ===
List of cardinals of the Pignatelli family, in chronological order:

- Antonio Pignatelli (1615–1700), son of Francesco, 4th Marquess of Spinazzola and 1st Prince of Minervino; Created cardinal on 1 September 1681; Elected Pope with the name of Innocent XII on 12 July 1691.
- Francesco Pignatelli (1652–1735), son of Julius II, 4th Marquess of Cerchiara and 2nd Prince of Noia; Created cardinal on 17 December 1703.
- Francesco Pignatelli (1744–1815), son of Fabrizio III, 10th Marquess of Cerchiara, 8th Prince of Noia; Created cardinal on 21 February 1794.
- Domenico Pignatelli (1730–1803), son of Antonio I, 6th Prince of Belmonte; Created cardinal on 9 August 1802.
- Ferdinando Pignatelli (1770–1853), son of Giovanni, 2nd Prince of Monteroduni; Created cardinal on 8 July 1839.
- Gennaro Granito Pignatelli (1851–1948), son of Angelo Granito and Paolina Francesca Pignatelli; created cardinal on 27 November 1911.

As for Cardinal Stefano Pignatelli (1578-1623, created cardinal in 1621), he was originally from Piegaro (Perugia) and was not related to the Neapolitan family of the same name.

== Branches ==
=== Princes of Castelvetrano (1564) ===
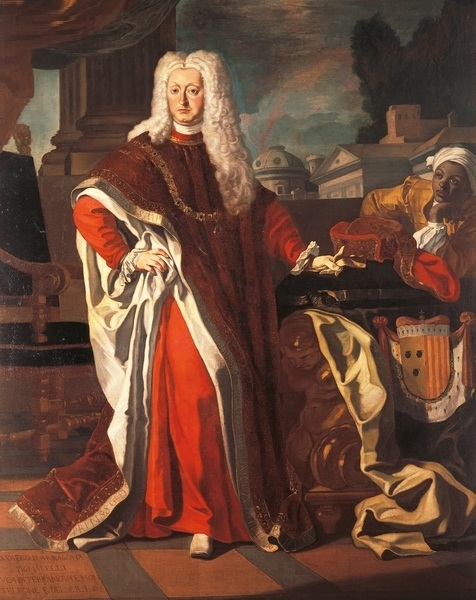
Diego Pignatelli d'Aragona Cortès, by Francesco Solimena, c. 1731–1732 or 1747

- 1564–1599: Carlo d'Aragona Tagliavia (1530–1599) (Note: Carlo was the father of Cardinal Simeone Tagliavia d'Aragona and Viceroy Ottavio d'Aragona.)
- 1599–1605: Carlo d'Aragona Tagliavia Marinis (c. 1570–1605)
- 1605–1624: Giovanni d'Aragona Tagliavia Pignatelli (c. 1585–1624)
- 1624–1653: Diego d'Aragona Tagliavia Pignatelli (1596–1654)
- 1653–1692: Giovanna d'Aragona Tagliavia Cortès (1619–1692)
- 1692–1723: Giovanna Pignatelli Pimentel Benavides (1666–1723)
- 1723–1750: Diego Pignatelli d'Aragona Cortés (1687–1750)
- 1750–1763: Fabrizio Matteo Pignatelli d'Aragona Cortés Pignatelli (1718–1763)
- 1763–1800: Ettore Pignatelli d'Aragona Cortés de' Medici (1742–1800)
- 1800–1818: Diego Pignatelli d'Aragona Cortés Piccolomini (1774–1818)
- 1818–1859: Giuseppe Pignatelli d'Aragona Cortés Caracciolo (1795–1859)
- 1859–1880: Diego Pignatelli d'Aragona Cortés Lucchese Palli (1823–1880)
- 1880–1881: Antonio Pignatelli d'Aragona Cortés Lucchese Palli (1827–1881)
- 1881–1938: Giuseppe Pignatelli d'Aragona Cortés Fardella (1860–1938)
- 1938–1946: Antonio Pignatelli d'Aragona Cortés Gàndara (1892–1956)

Recognition of Italian nobility ceased with the creation of the Italian Republic in 1946

=== Princes of Noia (1600) ===
- 1600–1627: Fabrizio Pignatelli Spinelli (1568–1627)
- 1627–1658: Giulio Pignatelli di Sangro (1587–1658)
- 1658–1664: Fabrizio Pignatelli Pignatelli (1604–1664)
- 1664–1674: Ettore Pignatelli Pignatelli (1620–1674)
- 1674–1677: Andrea Fabrizio Pignatelli Tagliavia (1640–1677)
- 1677–1723: Giovanna Pignatelli Pimentel Benavides (1666–1723) (Note: Giovanna married Niccolò Pignatelli (1648–1730), the Viceroy of Sicily who was a younger son of Giulio Pignatelli, 2nd Prince of Noia.)
- 1723–1750: Diego Pignatelli d'Aragona Cortés (1687–1750)
- 1750–1763: Fabrizio Matteo Pignatelli d'Aragona Cortés Pignatelli (1718–1763)
- 1763–1800: Ettore Pignatelli d'Aragona Cortés de' Medici (1742–1800)
- 1800–1818: Diego Pignatelli d'Aragona Cortés Piccolomini (1774–1818)
- 1818–1859: Giuseppe Pignatelli d'Aragona Cortés Caracciolo (1795–1859)
- 1859–1880: Diego Pignatelli d'Aragona Cortés Lucchese Palli (1823–1880)
- 1880–1881: Antonio Pignatelli d'Aragona Cortés Lucchese Palli (1827–1881)
- 1881–1938: Giuseppe Pignatelli d'Aragona Cortés Fardella (1860–1938)
- 1938–1946: Antonio Pignatelli d'Aragona Cortés Gàndara (1892–1956)

Recognition of Italian nobility ceased with the creation of the Italian Republic in 1946

=== Princes of Monteroduni (1702) ===
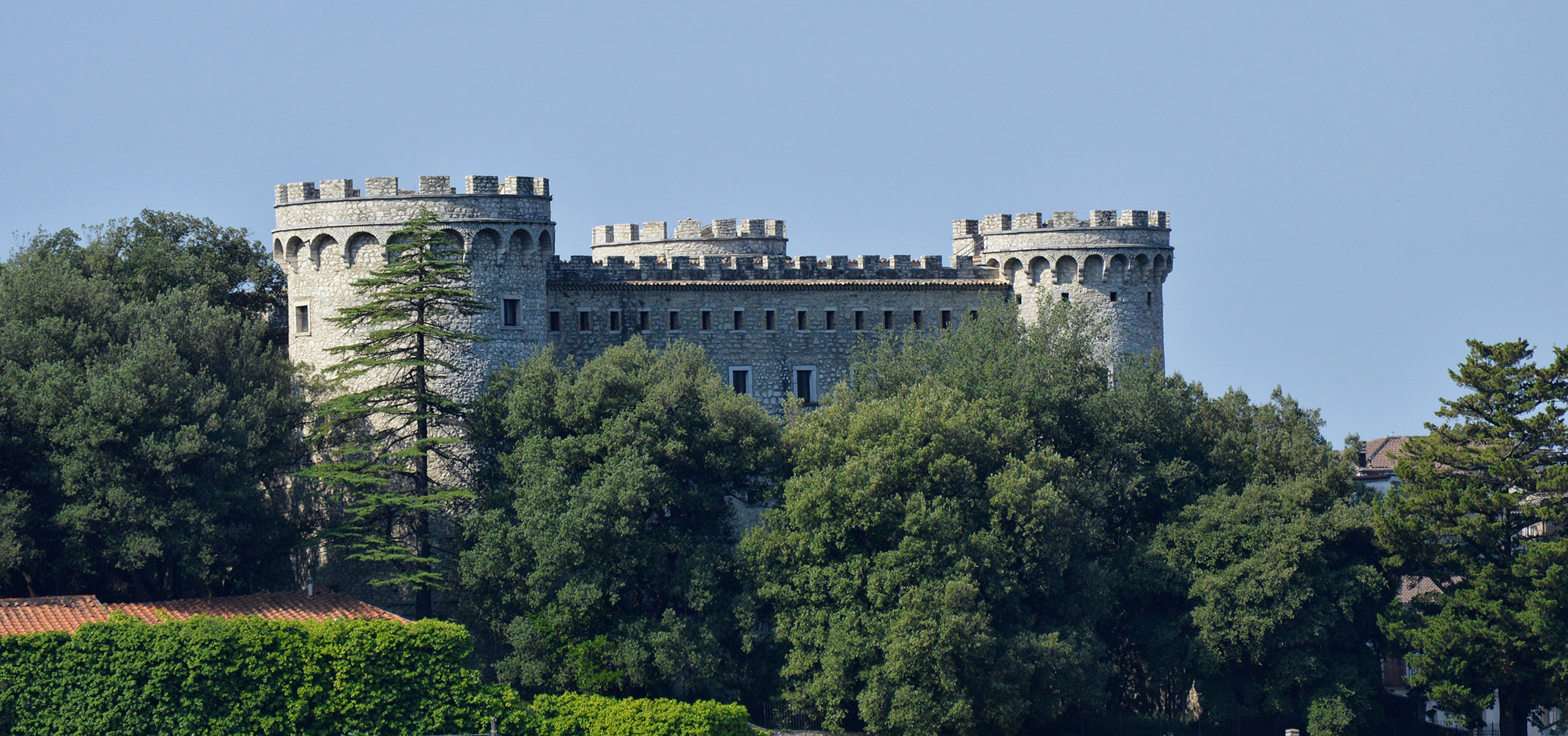
Pignatelli Castle at Monteroduni

In 1702, Luigi Pignatelli (1658–1736), was created Prince of Monteroduni. Luigi was the son of Giovanni Pignatelli di Casalnuovo (1633–1693). In 1843, the Pignatelli family of Monteroduni added the name of the extinct della Leonessa family to their own name following the marriage of Giovanni Pignatelli (1803–1865) to Carolina Ruffo della Leonessa (1814–1870).

- 1702–1736: Luigi Pignatelli (1658–1736), created Prince of Monteroduni in 1702. (Note: Through his daughter, Ippolita Pignatelli (1718–1760), he was a grandfather of Francesco d'Aquino, Prince of Caramanico (1738–1795), Ambassador to London and Paris for the Kingdom of Naples and, later, Viceroy of Sicily.)
- 1736–1791: Giovanni Pignatelli (1719–1791)
- 1791–1829: Luigi Pignatelli (1757–1829)
- 1829–1865: Giovanni Pignatelli (1803–1865)
- 1865–1871: Luigi Pignatelli della Leonessa (1836–1871)
- 1871–1911: Giovanni Pignatelli della Leonessa (1858–1911) (Note: His younger brother, Riccardo Pignatelli della Leonessa (1859–1908), was Prince of Sepino.)
- 1911–1930: Luigi Pignatelli della Leonessa (1885–1930)
- 1930–2015: Giovanni Pignatelli della Leonessa (1920–2015)

Recognition of Italian nobility ceased with the creation of the Italian Republic in 1946

=== Dukes of Monteleone (1527) ===
Coat of arms of the Duke of Monteleone

- 1527–1533: Ettore Pignatelli Alferi (c. 1465–1535)
- 1533–1579: Ettore Pignatelli Carafa (d. 1579), nephew of the preceding
- 1579–1583: Camillo Pignatelli Cardona (d. 1583)
- 1583–1622: Ettore Pignatelli Colonna (1572–1622)
- 1622–1667: Girolama Pignatelli Caracciolo (1599–1667) (Note: Girolama Pignatelli, Duchess of Monteleone was the wife of Fabrizio Pignatelli, 3rd Prince of Noia (1604–1664), eldest son of Giulio Pignatelli, 2nd Prince of Noia.)
- 1667–1674: Ettore Pignatelli Pignatelli (1620–1674), also 4th Prince of Noia.

Title passed to the Princes of Noia

=== Dukes of Terranova (1561) ===
- 1561–1599: Carlo d'Aragona Tagliavia (1530–1599)

Elevated to the Prince of Castelvetrano in 1564; passed into the Pignatelli family in 1692

=== Dukes of Bellosguardo (1625) ===
- 1625–1644: Giacomo Pignatelli (1590–1644) (Note: Giacomo married Donna Fiorenza Vaez, 1st Duchess of Bellosguardo (1608–1650), the daughter of Benedetto Vaez, Duke of Bellosguardo. Their youngest son, Don Domenico Pignatelli (b. 1642), was created the 1st Marquess of San Vicente; he married Doña Ana de Aimeric-Cruïllas de Santa Pau i d'Argeñola, 2nd Marchioness of Aimerich.)
- 1644–1676: Fabrizio Pignatelli (1625–1676)
- 1676–1701: Giacomo Pignatelli (1655–1701)
- 1701–1774: Margherita Pignatelli (1698–1774) (Note: Margherita married her cousin, Don Diego Pignatelli de Aragon, 7th Prince of Noia, 9th Duke of Monteleone, etc.)
- 1774–1800: Ettore Pignatelli d'Aragona Cortés de' Medici (1742–1800), also 9th Prince of Noia.

Title passed to the Princes of Noia

=== Marquesses of Cerchiara (1556) ===
- 1556–1567: Fabrizio Pignatelli (d. 1567)
- 1567–1577: Giulio Pignatelli Cicinelli (1520–1577)
- 1577–1627: Fabrizio Pignatelli Spinelli (1568–1627), created 1st Prince of Noia.

Elevated to the Prince of Noia in 1600

=== Counts of Fuentes (1508) ===
The Spanish title, Count of Fuentes, passed to the Pignatelli family through the 16th Count's maternal grandfather, Juan Bartolomé Isidro de Moncayo y Palafox (1675–1745), 15th Count'

- 16th Count: Joaquín Atanasio Pignatelli de Aragón y Moncayo (1724–1776)
- 17th Count: Luis Antonio Pignatelli de Aragón y Gonzaga (1749–1801), 4th Duke of Solferino
- 18th Count: Armando Casimiro Luis de Aragón y Egmond (1770–1809), 5th Duke of Solferino
- 19th Count: Juan Domingo Pignatelli de Aragón y Gonzaga (1757–1819), 6th Duke of Solferino
- 20th Count: Juan María Pignatelli de Aragón y Wall (1795–1823), 7th Duke of Solferino
- 21st Count: Juan Bautista Pignatelli de Aragón y Belloni (1823–1824), 8th Duke of Solferino
- 22nd Count: Juan José María Pignatelli de Aragón y Wall (1800–1851)
- 23rd Count: Antonio María Pignatelli de Aragón y Antentas (1824–1869)
- 24th Count: Antonio María Pignatelli de Aragón y Burgos (1958–1993)
- 25th Count: José María Pignatelli de Aragón y Burgos (b. 1959)
- 26th Count: Gerardo María Pignatelli de Aragón y Burgos (1964–2008)
- 27th Countess: Patricia Cayetana Pignatelli de Aragón y Ramiro.

== See also ==
- Map of the Duke of Noja
