= Diurnali del duca di Monteleone =

The Diurnali del duca di Monteleone is an anonymous annals of the Kingdom of Naples for the years 1265–1458. The work was initially entitled Cronaca or Storia d'incerto autore ('history of an uncertain author') by Angelo di Costanzo in the 16th century. The title by which it is now known comes from a manuscript owned by Ettore III Pignatelli, Duke of Monteleone.

The Diurnali can be divided into three parts. The first part goes down to 1371. The second, covering the period from 1371 to the accession of Alfonso I in 1443, is the most historically valuable. It was written by a single author, probably one associated with the royal court. A later author from the city of Bari and a partisan of the Princes of Taranto extended it down to 1458. Its sources include the Breve chronicon of Guglielmo Marramaldo, the Annales of Tommaso Loffredo and the Diarium regum Neapolis et Siciliae.

The Diurnali is a vernacular Italian work. It was written for a popular rather than educated audience. Its style is lively, imitative of the cantari (popular songs), and it makes extensive use of direct speech. Its political perspective evolves from pro-Angevin to pro-Aragonese. It gives a positive portrayal of Queen Joanna I. The authenticity of the Diurnali as a late medieval work was questioned until its definitive defence by Bartolommeo Capasso in the late 19th century.

== Editions ==
- Nunzio Federigo Faraglia, ed. Diurnali detti del Duca di Monteleone. Naples, 1895.
- Michele Manfredi, ed. I diurnali del Duca di Monteleone. Bologna, 1958.
- Giosuè Carducci Ettore, Michele Manfredi and Lodovico Antonio Muratori, eds. I diurnali del Duca di Monteleone. Bologna, 1960.

== Bibliography ==
- Casteen, Elizabeth (2015). From She-Wolf to Martyr: The Reign and Disputed Reputation of Johanna I of Naples. Cornell University Press.
- De Caprio, Chiara (2023). "Written and Oral Culture: Oral Narratives, Administrative Texts, Vernacular Historiography in Southern Italy". In Bianca de Divitiis (ed.). A Companion to the Renaissance in Southern Italy (1350–1600). Brill. pp. 412–431.
- Margolis, Oren (2016). The Politics of Culture in Quattrocento Europe: René of Anjou in Italy. Oxford University Press.
- Musto, Ronald G. (2019). Writing Southern Italy Before the Renaissance: Trecento Historians of the Mezzogiorno. Routledge.
