= Gaetano Trigona e Parisi =

His Eminence Gaetano Trigona e Parisi
- Archbishop of Palermo
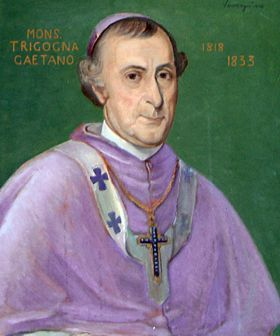
- Church: Catholic Church
- Archdiocese: Palermo
- Installed: 15 April 1833
- Term ended: 5 July 1837
- Predecessor: Pietro Gravina
- Successor: Ferdinando Maria Pignatelli
- Previous post: Bishop of Caltagirone (1818–1833)

Orders
- Ordination: 18 June 1791
- Consecration: 24 January 1819 by Domenico Benedetto Balsamo
- Created cardinal: 23 June 1834 by Pope Gregory XVI

Personal details
- Born: Gaetano Maria Giuseppe Benedetto Placido Vincenzo Trigona e Parisi; 2 June 1767 Piazza Armerina, Kingdom of Sicily
- Died: 5 July 1837 (aged 70) Palermo, Kingdom of the Two Sicilies

Gaetano Maria Giuseppe Benedetto Placido Vincenzo Trigona e Parisi (2 June 1767 – 5 July 1837) was an Italian prelate of the Catholic Church and cardinal.
