= Council of Nicaea =

Council of Nicaea can refer to:

- First Council of Nicaea in AD 325
- Second Council of Nicaea in AD 787
- The Council of Nicaea (audio drama)
- The Council of Nicaea (painting)
