= Ettore Pignatelli, 9th Prince of Noia =

Italian prince (1742-1800)

Ettore V Pignatelli
- 9th Prince of Noia; 11th Duke of Monteleone
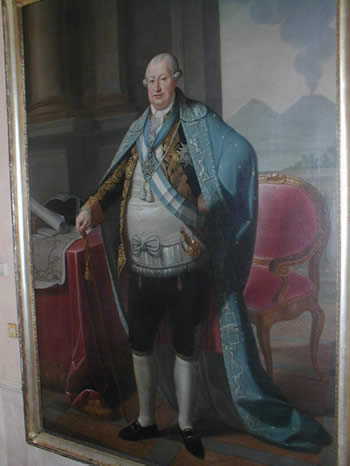
- Born: 8 September 1742; Monteleone, Apulia
- Died: 28 February 1800 (aged 57); Barra, Naples
- Noble family: Pignatelli
- Spouse: Princess Anna Maria Piccolomini d'Aragona
- Father: Fabrizio Matteo Pignatelli
- Mother: Costanza de' Medici

Ettore Mattia Maria Pignatelli Tagliavia d'Aragona Cortés, 9th Prince of Noia, 11th Duke of Monteleone (8 September 1742 – 28 February 1800) was an Italian prince.

== Early life ==
Pignatelli was born on 8 September 1742 in Monteleone in Apulia, Italy. He was the son of Fabrizio Matteo Pignatelli, 8th Prince of Noia (1718–1765) and Costanza de' Medici. Among his siblings were Cardinal Francesco Maria Pignatelli, and Princess Margherita Pignatelli (wife of Riccardo Carafa, 12th Duke of Andria).

His paternal grandparents were Diego Pignatelli, 7th Prince of Noia, and Margherita Pignatelli, 5th Duchess of Bellosguardo (a daughter of Giacomo Pignatelli, 3rd Duke of Bellosguardo and half sister of Francesco Caracciolo, 3rd Duke of Miranda). His maternal grandparents were Giuseppe de' Medici, 3rd Prince of Ottajano and Anna Caetani (a daughter of Gaetano Francesco Caetani, Duke of Sermoneta).

== Career ==
Upon the death of his father in 1765, he succeeded as the 9th Prince of Noia and 11th Duke of Monteleone as well as a number of other titles, including Prince of Castelvetrano, Duke of Bellosguardo, Marquis of Ávola and Favara, 10th Marquis of Valle de Oaxaca, Count of Borghetto, Baron of Birribaida, Baron of Belice, Baron of Petra Belice, Baron of Sant'Angelo Muxaro, and Baron of Baccarasi.

== Personal life ==
He married Princess Anna Maria Piccolomini d'Aragona (1748–1812), the daughter of Pompeo Piccolomini d'Aragona, 5th Prince of Valle and Margherita Caracciolo del Leone, 6th Duchess of Orta. Together, they were the parents of:

- Princess Giovanna Pignatelli (1769–1821), who married Antonio Pignatelli, 8th Prince of Belmonte, the son of Antonio Pignatelli, 7th Prince of Belmonte and Chiara Spinelli (the daughter of Troiano Spinelli, 9th Duke of Laurino); his younger brother was Gennaro Pignatelli, 9th Prince of Belmonte.
- Prince Fabrizio Pignatelli (1773–1779), who died young.
- Diego María Pignatelli, 10th Prince of Noia (1774–1818), who married Maria Carmela Caracciolo, a daughter of Giuseppe Litterio Caracciolo, 10th Marquis of Brienza, and Sofia Ruffo di Bagnara (a daughter of Letterio Ruffo, 2nd Duke of Baranello).
- Princess Margherita Pignatelli (1783–1830), who married Niccolò Filangieri, 7th Prince of Cutò, son of Alessandro Filangieri, 6th Prince of Cutò, and Nicoletta Filangieri, 2nd Baroness of San Carlo.
- Princess Caterina Pignatelli (1783–1860), who married Antonio di Sangro, 9th Duke of Casacalenda, son of Scipione di Sangro, 8th Duke of Casacalenda and Donna Maria Rosa Spinelli (a daughter of Antonio Spinelli, 8th Prince of Scalea).
- Princess Anna Maria Francisca Paola Pignatelli (1784–1837), who married Antonio Lucchesi-Palli, 7th Prince of Campofranco, 3rd Duke of Grazia, the son of Count Emanuele Lucchesi-Palli and Donna Maria Bianca Filangieri (a daughter of Alessandro Filangieri, 6th Prince of Cutò).
- Prince Giuseppe Pignatelli Piccolomini d'Aragona, Prince of Maida (1786–1827), who married Donna Maria Placida Imperiali, a daughter of Giulio Imperiali, 5th Prince of Sant'Angelo dei Lombardi and Maria Francesca Albertini, Princess of Faggiano, Duchess of Carosino. After her death in 1816, he married Angela Teresa Fiori.
- Princess Costanza Pignatelli (1787–1830), who married Giuseppe Antonio Filangieri, Prince of Mirto, a son of Bernardo Filangieri, 5th Prince of Mirto and Vittoria Alliata (a daughter of Giuseppe Letterio Alliata, Prince of Buccheri).

Pignatelli died on 28 February 1800 at Barra, in Naples.
