= Spinelly =

Spinelly is a surname. Notable people with the surname include:

- Andrée Spinelly (1877–1966), French actress
- Thomas Spinelly, English diplomat

== See also ==
- Spinelli, Italian surname
