= Maria Anna Josepha Althann =

Spanish noble (1689–1755)

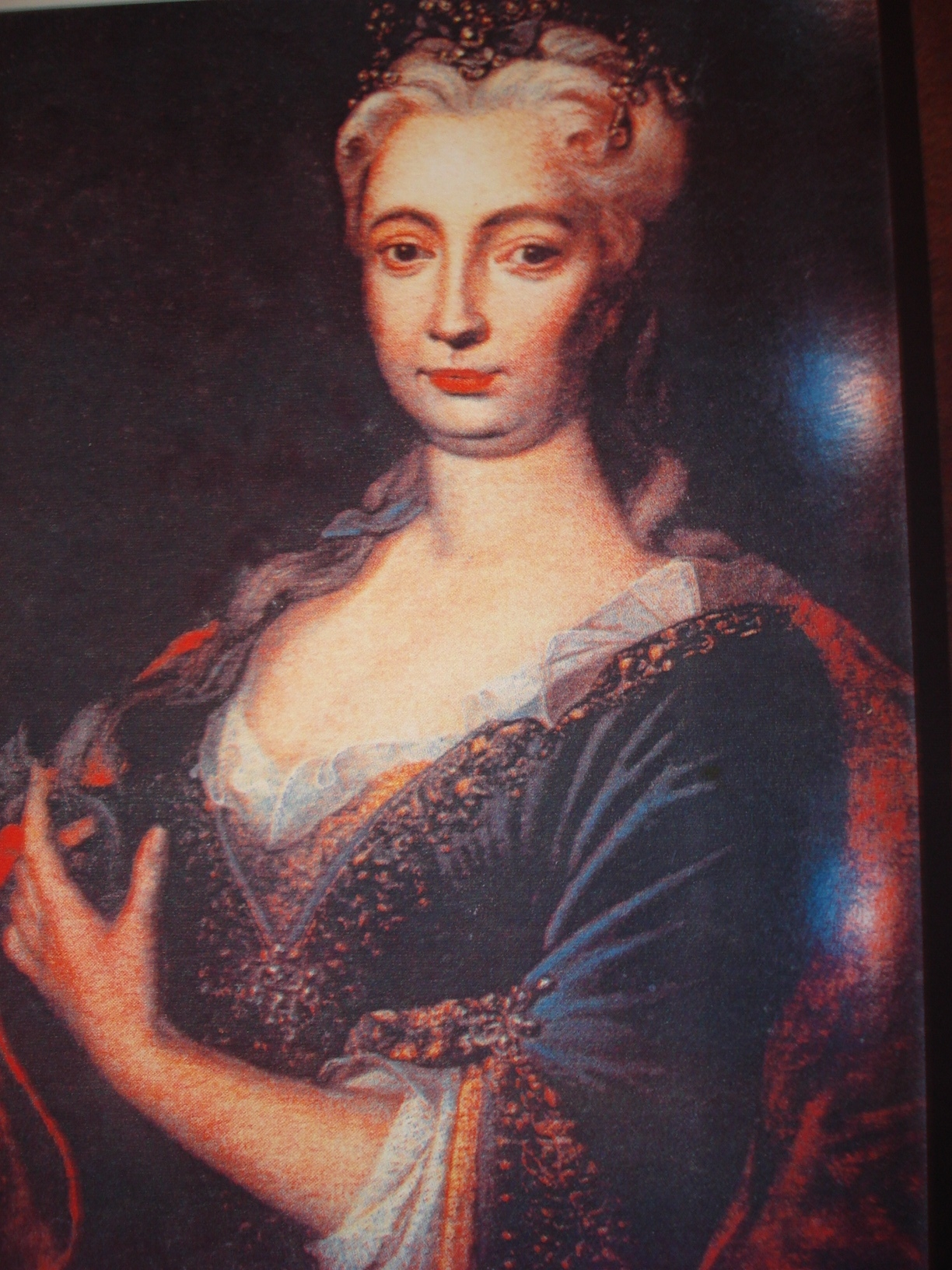
Ana Maria Pignatelli Althann

Maria Anna Josepha Althann (26 July 1689 - 1 March 1755) was a politically active Austrian countess. She was born as Donna Maria Anna Giuseppina Pignatelli di San Vicente. She was married Count Johann Michael von Althann, the favorite of Charles VI, Holy Roman Emperor, and known for her influence in the court of Spain and Austria, where she was an associate of the pro-Spanish party at court. She was also a noted patron of Italian art, and rumored to have secretly married Pietro Metastasio.
