= Pietro Gravina =

Italian Catholic cardinal (1749–1830)

His Eminence Pietro Gravina
- Archbishop of Palermo
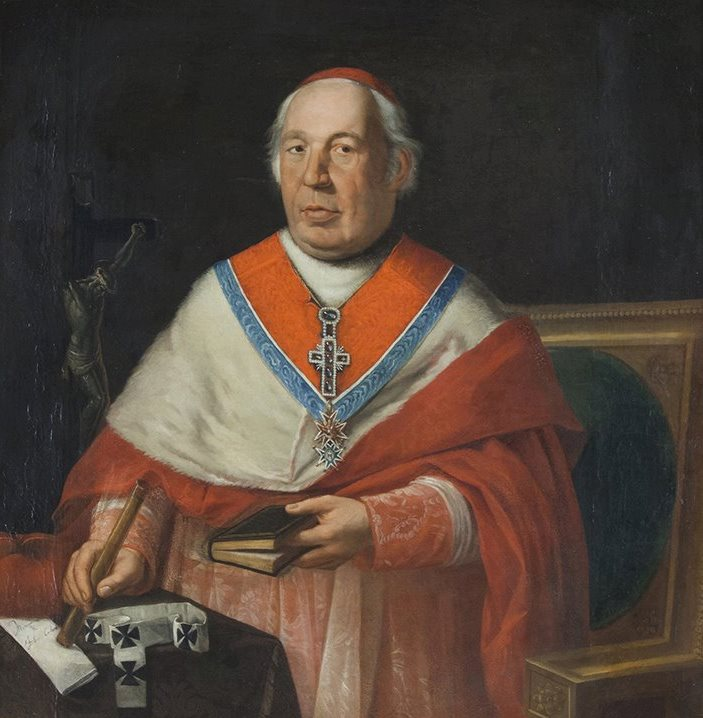
- Church: Catholic Church
- Archdiocese: Palermo
- Installed: 23 September 1816
- Term ended: 6 December 1830
- Predecessor: Raffaele Mormile
- Successor: Gaetano Trigona e Parisi
- Other posts: Titular Archbishop of Nicaea (1794–1817); Apostolic Nuncio to Switzerland (1794–1803); Apostolic Nuncio to Spain (1803–1816); Cardinal-Priest of San Lorenzo in Panisperna (1817–1830)

Orders
- Ordination: 7 April 1792
- Consecration: 14 September 1794 by Francesco Saverio de Zelada
- Created cardinal: 8 March 1816 by Pope Pius VII

Personal details
- Born: 16 December 1749 Montevago, Kingdom of Naples
- Died: 6 December 1830 (aged 80) Palermo, Kingdom of the Two Sicilies
- Coat of arms: Pietro Gravina's coat of arms

Ordination history
History
Episcopal consecration
- Principal consecrator: Francesco Saverio de Zelada
- Co-consecrators: Nicola Buschi, Michele Di Pietro
Cardinalate
- Elevated by: Pope Pius VII
Episcopal succession
Bishops consecrated by Pietro Gravina as principal consecrator
- Michele de Vincenti: 25 May 1817
- Paolo Filipponi: 5 July 1818
- Giovanni Baptist Maria Angelini: 30 April 1826
- Pietro Tasca: 21 May 1826
- Giovanni Battista Bagnasco: c. 1828
- Ignazio Cafisi: c. April 1830

Pietro Gravina (16 December 1749 – 6 December 1830) was an Italian Roman Catholic prelate and cardinal who was the archbishop of the Roman Catholic Archdiocese of Palermo from 1816 to his death in 1830.

== Bibliography ==
- G. Travagliato, Gravina Pietro, in Enciclopedia della Sicilia, edited by C. Napoleone, Parma, Ricci (Ed.), 2006, pp. 469–470.
