= Gate Church of the Trinity, Kyiv Pechersk Lavra =

Church in Kyiv, Ukraine

Gate Church of the Trinity
- Троїцька надбрамна церква
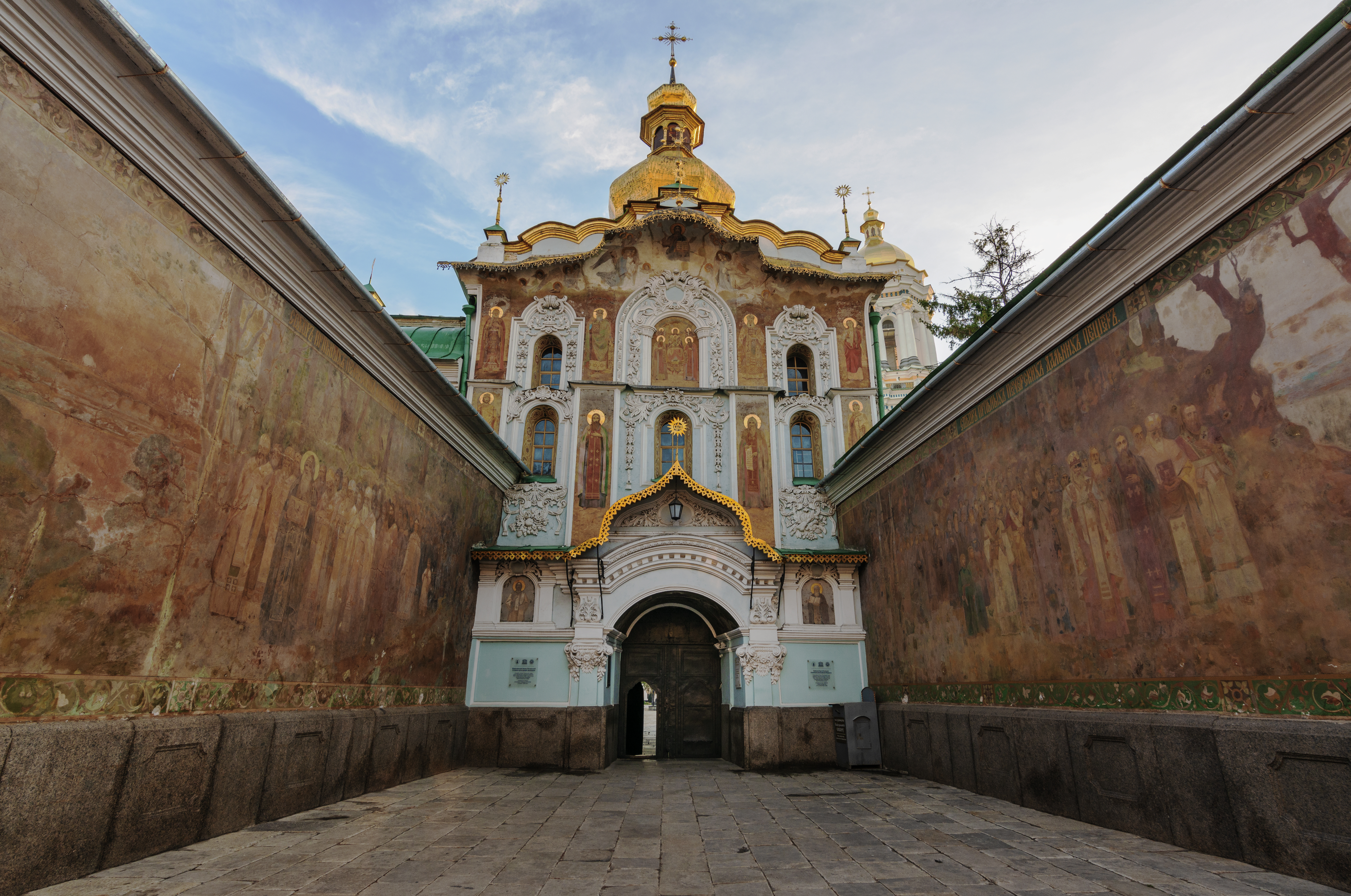
- The Gate Church of the Trinity sits atop the Holy Gates, an entrance to the Kyiv Pechersk Lavra.
- Gate Church of the Trinity
- 50.434715°N 30.555237°E
- Location: Kyiv, Ukraine. Part of the Kyiv Pechersk Lavra.
- Denomination: non-denominated

Architecture
- Architect: Mykola Sviatosha
- Style: Ukrainian Baroque
- Groundbreaking: 1106
- Completed: 1108

Immovable Monument of National Significance of Ukraine
- Official name: Троїцька надбрамна церква (Trinity Gate Church)
- Type: Architecture
- Reference no.: 260088/3

The Gate Church of the Trinity (Ukrainian: Троїцька надбрамна церква, romanized: Troits’ka nadbramna tserkva) is a historic church of the cave monastery of the Kyiv Pechersk Lavra in Kyiv, the capital of Ukraine. Originally being built as in the church style of Kievan Rus', the Gate Church of the Trinity is now decorated in the Ukrainian Baroque style, having been reconstructed many times through its history.

== History ==
The Gate Church of the Trinity was built in 1106-1108, as part of the Pechersk Lavra fortification, atop the main entrance to the monastery. The church was founded by the grandson of the Prince of Chernigov, Sviatoslav II, who renounced his princely status and became a Pechersk monk on November 17, 1106 under the name of Mykola Sviatosha. Mykola spent 36 years as a monk, and founded the Monastery Hospital of the Trinity within the Lavra.

After destruction of the Dormition Cathedral during the Mongol invasion of 1240, it became the main church of the monastery. In 1462, the most complete edition of the Kiev Pechersk Paterikcon was written here. In 1631, Petro Mohyla founded a school at the monastery's hospital. The school was later merged with the Kyivan Brotherhood School. Since 1701, the combined schools became a Kyivan Academy.

The church was studied by P. Lashkarev, I. Morgilevsky, Y. Aseev, F. Umantsev and S. Kilesso. In 1957-1958, their restoration efforts included replacing lost decorations, gilding the dome, and retouching external oil paintings.

== Architecture ==
The eighteenth century composition "The Council of Nicaea," by F. Pavlovskyi, I. Maksimovych, and A. Galik and others.

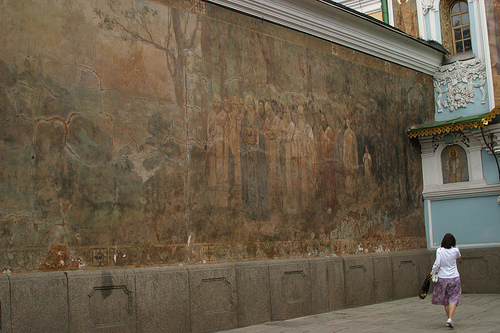
The oil paintings on the exteriour walls leading to the Holy Gates below the church.

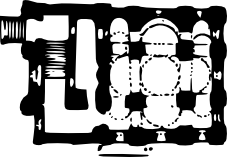
Plan of the Gate Church of the Trinity.

The church is located atop the Holy Gates (Ukrainian: Святі ворота), the main entrance to the monastery. Near the entrance are rooms for the gate's guards. The church is wedged between monastery walls, helping to protect the gates. The monastery walls, covered in frescoes, were renewed in 1900-1901 by D. Sonin and others.

The Gate Church of the Trinity is divided into three naves, each containing a spherical apse off the western side. An external stone stairway leads to the church. Several narrow window openings and the overall visually uplifting effect create a heightened sense of spiritual power.

The church is a typical Kievan Rus' construction built on an ancient stone church. Kievan Rus' architectural motifs can still be seen on the southern façade. The church retained its Ukrainian Baroque exteriour after restoration in the 17th-18th centuries by Master V. Stefanovych. During restoration, a new cupola was erected and interior paintings were added.

In 1725, a large sixteen-candle chandelier was installed. During the 1730s-1740s, artists from the monastery's iconography workshop decorated the church's interiour. The church's frescoes were based on Biblical scenes, and the exterior decor was based on Ukrainian folklore. Eighteenth-century compositions by F. Pavlovskyi, I. Maksimovych and A. Galik (with help from M. Yakubovych and I. Kadelskyi) have been preserved to this day, including "Faces of the Holy Martyr," "The Traders Cast Out of the Temple" and "The Council of Nicaea." The names of the painters were unknown for many years and only recently were revealed after archival research.

Interiour frescoes are a unique collection of 18th-century traditional Ukrainian architecture. Allegorical and historical Biblical topics are given in a noncanonical way; some include Ukrainian national ornaments. Carved wooden chairs, painted in Ukrainian folk tradition, are installed along the western wall.

== Links ==
- Media related to Gate Church of the Trinity (Kyiv Pechersk Lavra) at Wikimedia Commons
