= Spinetti =

Spinetti is an Italian surname. Notable people with the surname include:

- Henry Spinetti (born 1951), British drummer
- Luca Spinetti (born 1985), Italian footballer
- Mario Spinetti (1848–1925), Italian artist
- Roberto Spinetti (born 1965), Swiss serial killer
- Victor Spinetti (1929–2012), British comic actor
