= Ferdinando Maria Pignatelli =

Italian cardinal (1770–1853)

His Eminence Ferdinando Maria Pignatelli CR
- Archbishop of Palermo
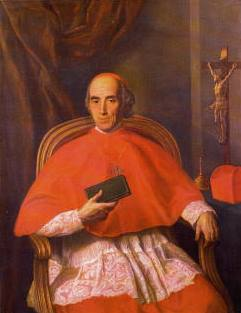
- Church: Catholic Church
- Archdiocese: Palermo
- Installed: 21 February 1839
- Term ended: 10 May 1853
- Predecessor: Gaetano Trigona e Parisi
- Successor: Giovanni Battista Naselli
- Other post: Cardinal-Priest of Santa Maria della Vittoria (1839–1853)

Orders
- Ordination: 25 May 1793
- Consecration: 1 April 1839 by Emmanuele de Gregorio
- Created cardinal: 8 July 1839 by Pope Gregory XVI

Personal details
- Born: 9 June 1770 Naples, Kingdom of Naples
- Died: 10 May 1853 (aged 82)
- Buried: Palermo Cathedral
- Coat of arms

Ordination history
History
Episcopal consecration
- Principal consecrator: Emmanuele de Gregorio
- Co-consecrators: Antonio Luigi Piatti, Ignazio Giovanni Cadolini
Cardinalate
- Elevated by: Pope Gregory XVI
Episcopal succession
Bishops consecrated by Ferdinando Maria Pignatelli as principal consecrator
- Domenico Maria Cilluffo e Costa: 24 April 1842
- Angelo Filipponi: 24 April 1842
- Pier Francesco Brunaccini: 8 September 1844

Ferdinando Maria Pignatelli (9 June 1770 – 10 May 1853) was an Italian Roman Catholic prelate and cardinal. He was the archbishop of Palermo from 1839 to his death in 1853.

== Biography ==
Ferdinando was born into the noble House of Pignatelli in Naples on 9 June 1770. He was the son of Giovanni Pignatelli, 2nd Prince of Monteroduni, and Donna Lucrezia Mormile (1730–1813), who were cousins.

His paternal grandparents were Luigi Pignatelli, 1st Prince of Monteroduni, and Maddalena Mormile (a daughter of the 2nd Duke of Carinari). His maternal grandparents were Michele Mormile, 4th Duke of Carinari, and Vittoria Mariconda, Duchess of Marzanello.
