= Ettore Pignatelli, 1st Duke of Monteleone =

Italian duke

Ettore Pignatelli (c. 1465 – 7 March 1535) was the first count (from 1506) and later duke (from 1527) of Monteleone.

== Early life ==
The coat of arms of the multibranched Italian-Spanish family Pignatelli.

Pignatelli was born in c. 1465 to Carlo Pignatelli, Lord of Monticello, and Mariella Alferi. His brother, Camillo Pignatellli, married Giulia Carafa.

In 1501 he purchased from King Frederick the lands of Borrello, Rosarno, Misiano and Monteleone, Torre di Bivona, Cinquefrondi, with the fiefdom called Morbogallico, and obtained the title of Count of Borrello. During the reign of King Ferdinand II of Aragon, he was awarded the additional title of Count of Monteleone in 1506, which was erected into a Duchy in 1527 by privilege of Charles V.

== Career ==
In the war of the French against the Republic of Venice, 1511–1513, he was taken prisoner to France in the defeat, for the Spaniards, known as Battle of Ravenna, 10 April 1512, while the acting Viceroy of Naples was Ramón de Cardona.

In 1517, the now 17 years old King Charles I of Spain on advice of his international war counselors awarded him the title of Viceroy of Sicily, 1517 - 1535. He replaced there Hugo of Moncada, as Hugo of Moncada, apparently, had suggested to put as Viceroy an "Italian" to calm the restlessness of the Sicilians with the Spanish seamen and troopers concentrating there to fight against the Tunisian and Algerian sailors and warriors seeking defense alliances with the Ottoman Turks.

In 1523, he managed to quench some restlessness from Sicilian families, namely the Spadafora family group. In 1527, King Charles I of Spain rewarded him by changing the 1st County of Monteleone to 1st Duchy of Monteleone.

The Mediterranean Sea side capital of Libya, Tripoli, conquered for Spain by Navarrese Pedro Navarro, count of Oliveto, had been assigned in 1523 by Charles V, Holy Roman Emperor to the Knights of St. John who had lately been expelled by the Ottoman Turks from their stronghold on the island of Rhodes. From 1523 - 1530 the same was done with the Sicilian ruled islands of Gozo and Malta, with the character of suzerain's as a perpetual fief, of the Emperor and the Viceroy of Sicily, namely, Ettore Pignatelli e Caraffa.

In 1532, Suleiman the Magnificent besieged Vienna unsuccessfully again, as in 1529, and it were Pignatelli e Caraffa and Genovese Admiral Andrea Doria, who had changed in 1528 his contract as a mercenary condottiero at the service of France to fighting under king Charles I of Spain the Holy Roman Emperor, who went in a conquering expedition to what is now Greece.

They received naval assistance, among others, of the Sicilian kingdom, the Naples kingdom, and of the Spanish viceroys and Captain Generals in Andalucia, Castile, Aragon, Valencia and Catalonia, dealing with ship transports of troops within the Mediterranean Sea at the time. They conquered Koroni, at Messenia, Greece. Patras, with some short time reconquering by the westerners was however mainly a Greek located Turkish port till about 1828. Around 1534, both places lost contact with Sicily.

== Personal life ==
In 1489, he married Donna Ippolita Gesualdo (1460–1531), daughter of Sansone Gesualdo, Count of Conza, and Costanza di Capua. Together, they were the parents of:

- Camillo Pignatelli, Count of Borrello (d. 1529), who died in Bari fighting against the troops of Francis I who had invaded Calabria.
- Isabella Pignatelli
- Costanza Pignatelli

Pignatelli died in Palermo, while Viceroy, on 7 March 1535. As his son Camillo had predeceased him in 1529, he was succeeded by his nephew, Ettore Pignatelli (d. 1579), as universal heir of all his movable and immovable assets in the Kingdom of Naples, in the Kingdom of Sicily and on the Island of Malta (the fiefdom of Marsa), of the Duchy of Monteleone and of the County of Borrello as they were united and bound in a single indivisible body.
