= Joaquín Atanasio Pignatelli de Aragón y Moncayo =

Hispano-Italian advisor and diplomat

The Most Excellent Joaquin Pignatelli Marquess of Coscojuela, Count of Fuentes (etc...)
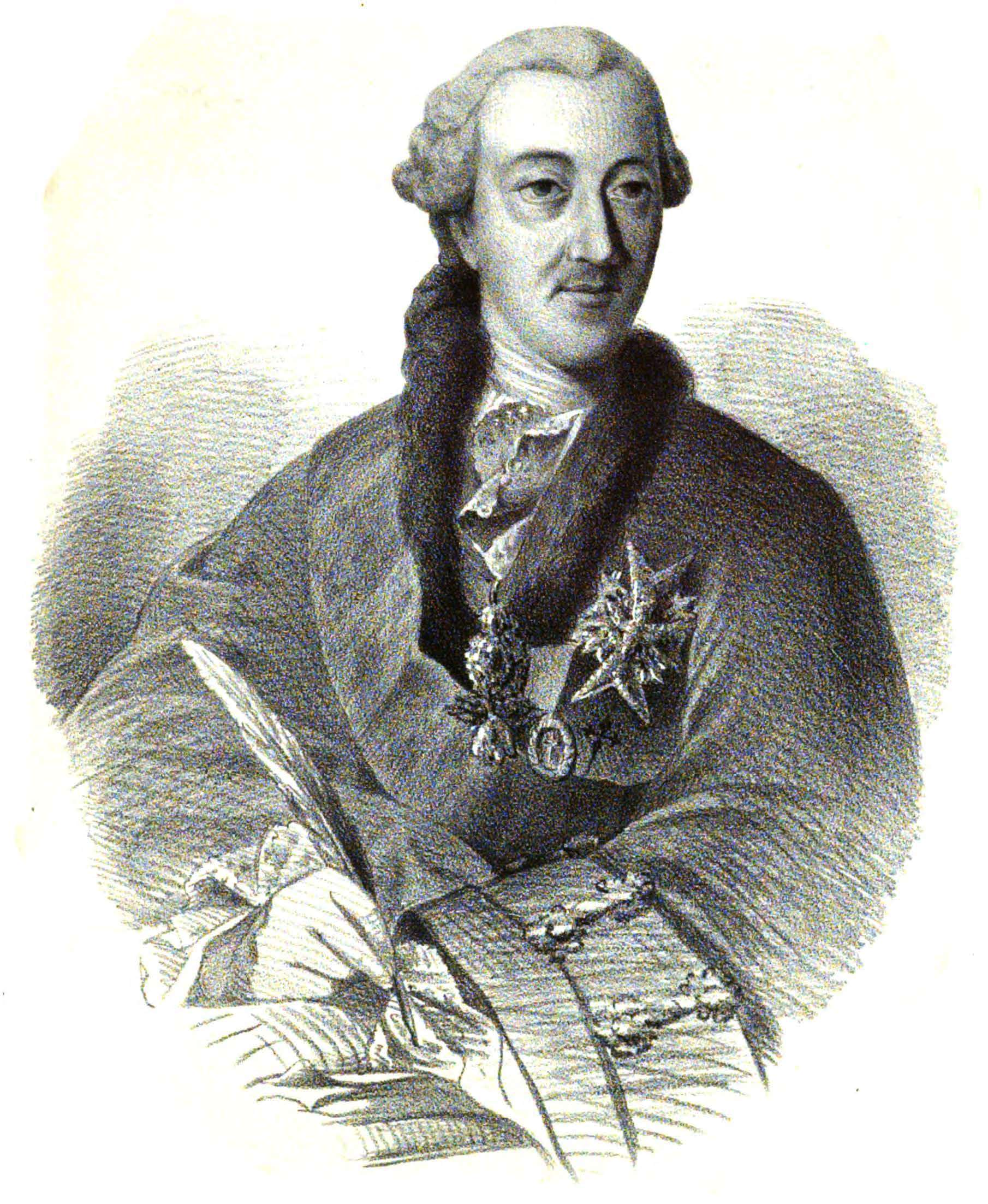
- Pignatelli by Augusto de Burgos

Spanish Ambassador to France
- In office 1763–1773
- Preceded by: Jerónimo Grimaldi
- Succeeded by: Pedro Pablo Abarca de Bolea

Spanish Ambassador to the United Kingdom
- In office 1760–1762
- Preceded by: Félix José de Abreu Bertodano
- Succeeded by: Jerónimo Grimaldi

Spanish Ambassador to the Kingdom of Sardinia
- In office 1754–1758

Personal details
- Born: 2 May 1724 Caltanissetta, Sicily
- Died: 12 May 1776 (aged 52) Madrid, Spain
- Spouse(s): María Luisa de Gonzaga y Caraciolo (m. 1741; died 1773) Mariana de Silva-Bazán y Sarmiento (m. 1775; died 1776)
- Children: 8
- Parent(s): Antonio Pignatelli de Aragon; Francisca de Moncayo y Blanes

Joaquín Atanasio Pignatelli de Aragón y Moncayo (2 May 1724 – 12 May 1776), 16th Count of Fuentes and 4th Marquess of Coscojuela, Grandee of Spain, was a Hispano-Italian advisor and diplomat at the service of the Spanish monarchy.

== Early life ==
He was born in the illustrious Pignatelli family, connected with the highest Neapolitan and Aragonese nobility. His father, Antonio Pignatelli de Aragon (1700–1746), was a second son of the 9th Duke of Monteleón and Noya, and his mother, Francisca de Moncayo y Blanes (1700-1742), was Countess of Fuentes and Marchioness of Coscojuela.

The young count was a Gentleman of the chamber of Ferdinand VI of Spain and Grandee of Spain 1st Class since 1751.

== Career ==
Pignatelli served as Ambassador in Turin from 1754 to 1758, in London from 1760 to 1762 and in Paris from 1763 to 1773. His stay in London was very difficult during the Seven Years' War.

During his embassy in France, he led the Spanish entry into the third Pacte de Famille and built a solid friendship with Étienne François, duc de Choiseul, Prime Minister of King Louis XV of France, who saw in Fuentes a "spirit suitable for business", of "broad genius", as well as a "very honest man and attached to our system." The Count was also a close friend of Jerónimo Grimaldi, although became more distant around 1775.
After the fall of Choiseul in December 1770, Fuentes refused to pay respect to Madame du Barry, the new favorite of the French monarch and a former prostitute. This led to his forced departure from France in December 1772, being replaced by the Count of Aranda.

Back in Spain, he refused to exercise the presidency of the Council of Castile after the departure of Aranda, dedicating himself fully to his work as president of the Council of Orders (Consejo de Órdenes), a position he had held since 1768. Likewise, since 1763, he was a member of the State Council.

He was a Knight in the Spanish Order of the Golden Fleece (1761) and the French Order of the Holy Spirit (1768).

== Personal life ==
In 1741, Fuentes married María Luisa de Gonzaga y Caraciolo, 2nd Duchess of Solferino (1726–1773). From this union eight children were born, including:

- José María Pignatelli de Aragón y Gonzaga (1744–1774), Marquess of Mora, 3rd Duke of Solferino, lover of Jeanne Julie Éléonore de Lespinasse and husband of María Ignacia (1745-1764), daughter of Pedro Pablo Abarca de Bolea, 10th Count of Aranda.
- Francisca Pignatelli de Aragón y Gonzaga (1747–1768), who married of Luis Fernández de Córdoba y Spínola, 11th Duke of Medinaceli.
- Luis Antonio Pignatelli de Aragón y Gonzaga (1749–1801), 17th Count of Fuentes, 4th Duke of Solferino.
- María Manuela Pignatelli de Aragón y Gonzaga (1753–1816), who married Juan Pablo de Aragón-Azlor, 11th Duke of Villahermosa.
- Juan Domingo Pignatelli de Aragón y Gonzaga (1757–1819), 6th Duke of Solferino.

After the death of his first wife, he remarried in 1775 to Mariana de Silva-Bazán y Sarmiento, widow of Francisco de Silva, 10th Duke of Huéscar, and mother of María Cayetana de Silva. The Duchess Mariana originally was going to marry the eldest son of Fuentes, José María, 3rd Duke of Solferino, but he died before the marriage could be concluded. Fuentes died one year after this second marriage.

The 16th Count of Fuentes died on 12 May 1776 and was buried in the Convent of San Hermenegildo in Madrid.
