= The Council of Nicaea (painting) =

Painting by F. Pavlovskyi, I. Maksimovych, A. Galik, G. Karataev and others

- Artist: F. Pavlovskyi, I. Maksimovych, and A. Galik and others
- Year: 18th century
- Type: Oil
- Location: Gate Church of the Trinity (Pechersk Lavra), Kyiv

The Council of Nicaea is an 18th-century painting by F. Pavlovskyi, I. Maksimovych, A. Galik, G. Karataev and others. It is hanging in the Gate Church of the Trinity in Kyiv, Ukraine.

The painting depicts the First Council of Nicaea in AD 325, the first ecumenical council of bishops of the Christian Church. The crowned and enthroned figure of Jesus Christ is pictured in the centre of the painting to emphasize his spiritual headship of the Council. Eustathius of Antioch is visible in the right foreground.
