= Roberto Spinetti =

Swiss serial killer (born 1965)

- Born: 1965 (age 60–61); Lucerne, Switzerland
- Other name: "The 7.65 Caliber Killer"
- Convictions: Murder x2 Manslaughter; Attempted murder
- Penalty: Life imprisonment (Molino); 30 years imprisonment (Fabbri); 26 years and 4 months (Rosin and Todorova)

Details
- Victims: 3
- Span of crimes: October 12 – November 10, 2003
- Country: Italy
- States: Aosta Valley, Emilia-Romagna, Lombardy
- Date apprehended: November 28, 2003

Roberto Spinetti (born 1965), known as The 7.65 Caliber Killer (Italian: Il killer della calibro 7,65), is a Swiss serial killer who murdered three prostitutes and wounded one more in northern Italy from October to November 2003 during robberies, which he carried out to pay off his gambling debts. Found guilty on all counts in three separate trials, he was sentenced to a life term and 56 years imprisonment.

== Early life ==
Roberto Spinetti was born in 1965 in Lucerne, Switzerland, to Italian parents from Abruzzo. Little is known about his childhood, but at one point he moved to Zürich, where he married, had two children and operated a successful real estate business. Spinetti was known as an avid gambler, spending a lot of time in casinos in Monte Carlo, Venice and Saint-Vincent. In 1999, he permanently moved to Italy, supposedly to evade prosecution for large-scale real estate fraud and other financial offences in his native Switzerland.

== Murders ==
During the fall of 2003, Spinetti embarked on a crime spree that would leave three prostitutes dead and another with permanent injuries. The first of these was 31-year-old Catena Molino, who was picked up in Châtillon and found shot to death in a forest between Montjovet and Champdepraz on October 12. Spinetti then stole her purse and cell phone.

On October 25, he picked up 41-year-old Graziela Fabbri in Ravenna, who was also robbed and found to death near the Mirabilandia water park. Authorities investigating both murders noticed a peculiar oddity: aside from the fact that the victims had been robbed, some of the shell casings from the murder weapon were apparently missing as well.

Another suspicious death occurred on November 10, when 52-year-old Maria Grazia Rosin was found dead in her camper van on a highway near Montirone. Unlike previous victims, she had apparently died from a heart attack, but due to the fact she had been robbed of all her possessions, investigators considered that she was likely attacked by the same perpetrator.

A day after this, Spinetti picked up 29-year-old Bulgarian prostitute Vanya Todorova in Marghera, then drove a few kilometers towards a highway leading to Cavallino, where he shot her in the neck and left her for dead. Spinetti then stole money, her jewellery and her mobile phone, before leaving the crime scene. Todorova would survive the ordeal after being interned at a hospital in Jesolo, but suffered from temporary memory loss and was paralyzed from the waist down.

== Arrest, trial, and sentence ==
Soon after stealing Todorova's phone, Spinetti placed a phone call to a brothel in Siderno, unaware that the phone was being traced by the authorities. After questioning some witnesses, investigators identified Spinetti as the prime suspect in the attempted murder of Todorova, as he was seen picking her up in his red Volkswagen Passat.

On November 28, Spinetti was spotted driving his car along the A3 highway, engaging in a high-speed chase with members of the Reparto volanti. Spinetti refused to pull over and accelerated even more, but traffic policemen who had set up a roadblock shot at his Volkswagen, blowing out the tires and causing the car to crash into a toll booth near Eboli. After he was dragged out of the car and transported to a local jail, officers examined the inside of the vehicle, where they found a 7.65 caliber pistol wrapped up in a brown silk scarf, which they believed belonged to one of the victims. For their actions during the chase, several officers from the region's traffic police were congratulated by Salerno's chief police commissioner.

In the subsequent interrogations, Spinetti readily admitted to the murders, claiming that he was desperate for money to pay off his gambling debts. While this was accepted as his primary motive, one psychologist suggested that the crimes may have had a sexual element to them, as two of the women's panties had been stolen.

During his murder trial, Spinetti recanted his previous confessions and now claimed that he had gotten involved with a supposed Ukrainian loan shark named "Jimmy", who he claimed had given him the gun and ordered him to collect payments from the victims. In addition to this, his public defenders attempted to argue that their client was not the killer, citing the fact that the only surviving victim - Todorova - had trouble identifying him due to the fact that he had shaven and no longer had a beard. On the other hand, prosecutors also had trouble with deciding whether to charge him with murder in the Rosin case, as her cause of death was ruled to be the result of a heart attack caused by the robbery.

In the end, it was decided that Spinetti would be tried for the respective crimes in separate trials, corresponding to whatever region they were committed in. He was found guilty on all counts in each, receiving a life term for the murder of Molino; 30 years for the murder of Fabbri; and a combined 26 years and 4 months on a manslaughter and attempted murder charge in the Rosin-Todorova case. The reduced sentence in the latter trials came from the fact that Spinetti was diagnosed with a borderline personality disorder, but was still fully aware of what he was doing.

== See also ==
- List of serial killers by country
