= Misiano =

Misiano is a surname. Notable people with the surname include:

- Christopher Misiano, American television director and producer
- Fortunato Misiano (1899–1976), Italian film producer
- Francesco Misiano (1884-1936), Italian communist and film producer.
- Vincent Misiano, American television director, brother of Christopher
