= Francesco Maria Pignatelli =

Italian cardinal (1744–1815)

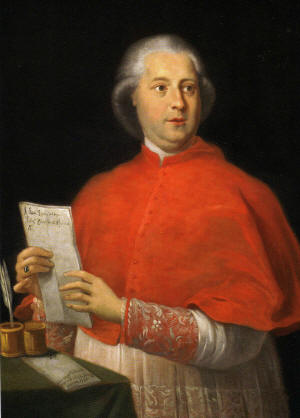
Portrait of Cardinal Pignatelli, 19th century

Francesco Maria Pignatelli (19 February 1744 – 14 August 1815), was an Italian cardinal.

Coat of arms of Francesco Pignatelli

== Biography ==
Born at Rosarno, in the Province of Reggio Calabria on 19 February 1744. He was the son of Fabrizio Matteo Pignatelli, 8th Prince of Noia (1718–1765) and Costanza de' Medici. Among his siblings were Ettore Pignatelli, 9th Prince of Noia, Diego Pignatelli, and Margherita Pignatelli. Amongst his family members were fellow cardinal Francesco Pignatelli and Pope Innocent XII (born Antonio Pignatelli).

He was appointed Cardinal-Priest of Santa Maria del Popolo on 21 February 1794, the same day he was elevated to Cardinal. From 1799 to 1800, he participated in the Conclave that elected Pope Pius VII who replaced Pope Pius VI. On 2 April 1800, he was appointed Cardinal-Priest of Santa Maria in Trastevere.

He died at Rome on 14 August 1815 and was buried at Santa Maria in Trastevere.
