= Coscojuela de Sobrarbe =

Coscojuela de Sobrarbe Cosculluela de Sobrarbe
- Locality
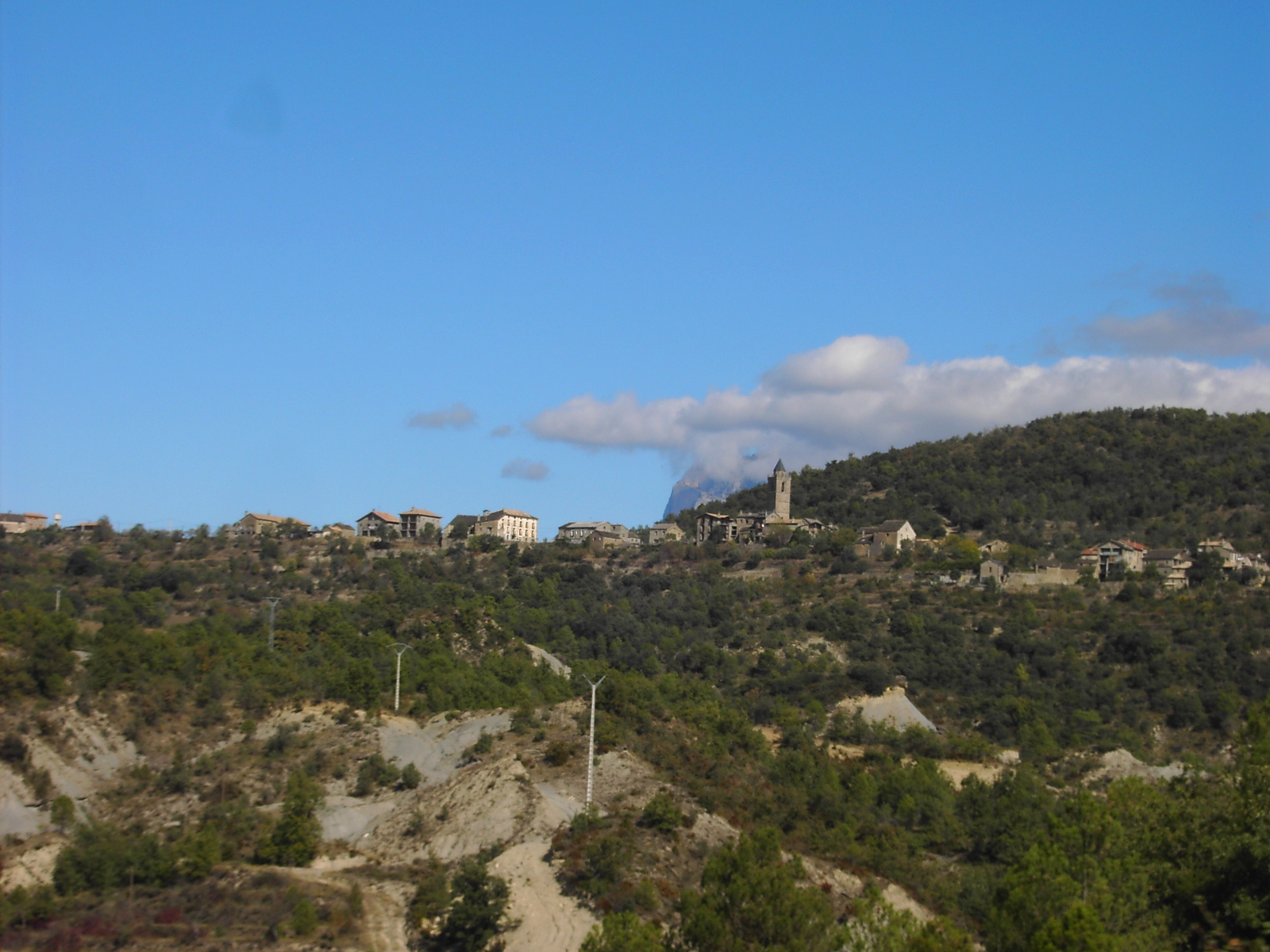

- Location within Aragon Location within Spain
- Coordinates: 42°21′41″N 0°9′35″E
- Country: Spain
- Autonomous community: Aragon
- Province: Province of Huesca
- Municipality: Aínsa-Sobrarbe
- Elevation: 658 m (2,159 ft)

Population
  - Total: 43

Coscojuela de Sobrarbe (Aragonese: Cosculluela de Sobrarbe) is a locality located in the municipality of Aínsa-Sobrarbe, in Huesca province, Aragon, Spain. As of 2020, it has a population of 43.

== Geography ==
Coscojuela de Sobrarbe is located 106km east-northeast of Huesca.
