= Spinelli =

Spinelli is an Italian surname. Notable people with the surname include:

- Altiero Spinelli (1907–1986), Italian advocate for European federalism and founding father of the European Union
- Anita Spinelli (1908–2010), Swiss artist and painter
- Anthony Spinelli (1927–2000), American director of pornographic films
- Antonio Spinelli (bishop) C.R. (1657–1724), Italian Roman Catholic Bishop of Melfi and Rapolla
- Antonio Spinelli (football manager) (born 1980), Argentine football manager
- Ashley Spinelli, a character in the cartoon Recess (TV series)
- Barbara Spinelli (born 1946), Italian politician
- Brunello Spinelli (1939–2018), Italian water polo player
- Chiara Spinelli (1744–1823), Italian noblewoman and pastellist
- Claudio Spinelli (born 1998), Argentine footballer
- Damian Spinelli, a fictional character on the American soap opera General Hospital
- Elisabetta Spinelli (born 1968), Italian voice actress
- Filippo Spinelli (1566–1616), Roman Catholic cardinal
- Francesco Spinelli (1853–1913), Italian Roman Catholic priest and founder of the Sisters Adorers of the Blessed Sacrament
- Fernando Spinelli, Argentine footballer
- Gennaro Spinelli, Prince of Cariati (1780–1851), Italian politician and diplomat
- Gérard Spinelli, Mayor of the French town of Beausoleil, adjoining part of the Principality of Monaco
- Gianluca Spinelli (born 1966), Italian professional football goalkeeper coach
- Giovanni Battista Spinelli (c. 1597 – c. 1647), Italian painter
- Giuseppe Spinelli (cardinal) (1694–1763), cardinal prefect of the Congregation for the Evangelization of Peoples
- Giuseppe Spinelli (politician) (1908–1987), Italian politician
- Jerry Spinelli (born 1941), American author
- Juanita Spinelli (1889–1941), the first woman to be executed by the state of California
- Laurita Spinelli, with Carlotta Truman, the German duo of the Eurovision Song Contest 2019
- Luca Spinelli, Swiss investigative journalist and the founder of the legal open source project Oscon
- Manuela Spinelli, translator associated with Italian association football coach Giovanni Trapattoni
- Mitchell Spinelli, American pornographic film director and producer
- Nicola Antonio Spinelli C.R. (1583–1634), Italian Roman Catholic Bishop of Alessano
- Niccola Spinelli (1865–1909), Italian opera composer
- Parri Spinelli (c. 1387–1453, Italian painter of the early Renaissance
- Pietro Antonio Spinelli (1597–1645), Roman Catholic Archbishop of Rossano
- Spinello di Luca Spinelli (c. 1350 – c. 1410), Italian painter from Arezzo
- Tomás Spinelli (born 1993), Argentine footballer
- Troiano Spinelli (1712–1777), Italian nobleman, economic philosopher, and historian

== Buildings ==
- Palazzo Corner Spinelli, on the Grand Canal, Venice, Italy
- Palazzo Spinelli di Laurino, Naples, 15-century palace in central Naples, Italy
- Stadio Marco Spinelli, a municipal stadium in Alife, Italy

== Other uses ==
- Aguilar–Spinelli test, from the United States Supreme Court case, Spinelli v. United States
- Spinelli Group, a network planned for the so-called United States of Europa

== See also ==
- Spinelly, surname page
- Spina (disambiguation)
- Spinetti, surname page
