= Francesco Pignatelli, 7th Prince of Strongoli =

Italian army officer and noble (1774–1853)

Francesco Pignatelli
- Prince of Strongoli
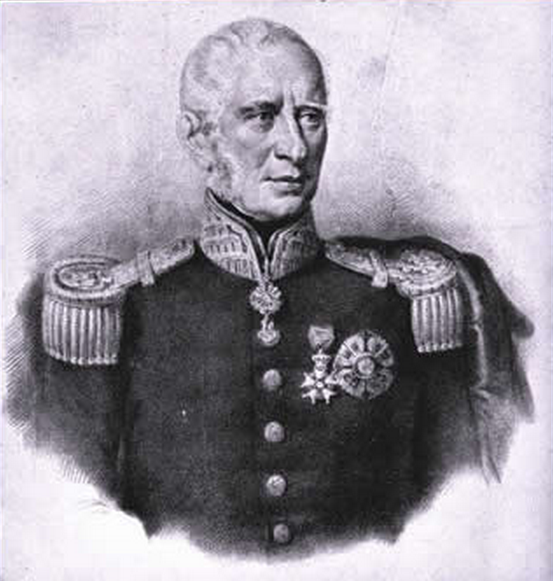
- Born: 2 February 1774; Naples
- Died: 27 April 1853 (aged 78); Naples
- Occupation: General

Francesco Pignatelli, 7th Prince of Strongoli (1774–1853) was an Italian nobleman and military commander. He was a nephew of Francesco Pignatelli, marchese di Laino.

== Peninsular War ==
In March 1810 Pignatelli was sent to command the Neapolitan Division incorporated in Étienne Macdonald's troops in Catalonia. Pignatelli had previously served under Macdonald in Naples.

In mid-August, his division, together with the other Italian division, under Severoli, and Frère's division, were able to successfully escort a large convoy into Barcelona.

On 15 September 1810 Catalan insurgents captured a whole battalion of Pignatelli's Neapolitans on the Ebro.
