= Francesco Pignatelli =

Italian cardinal (1652–1734)

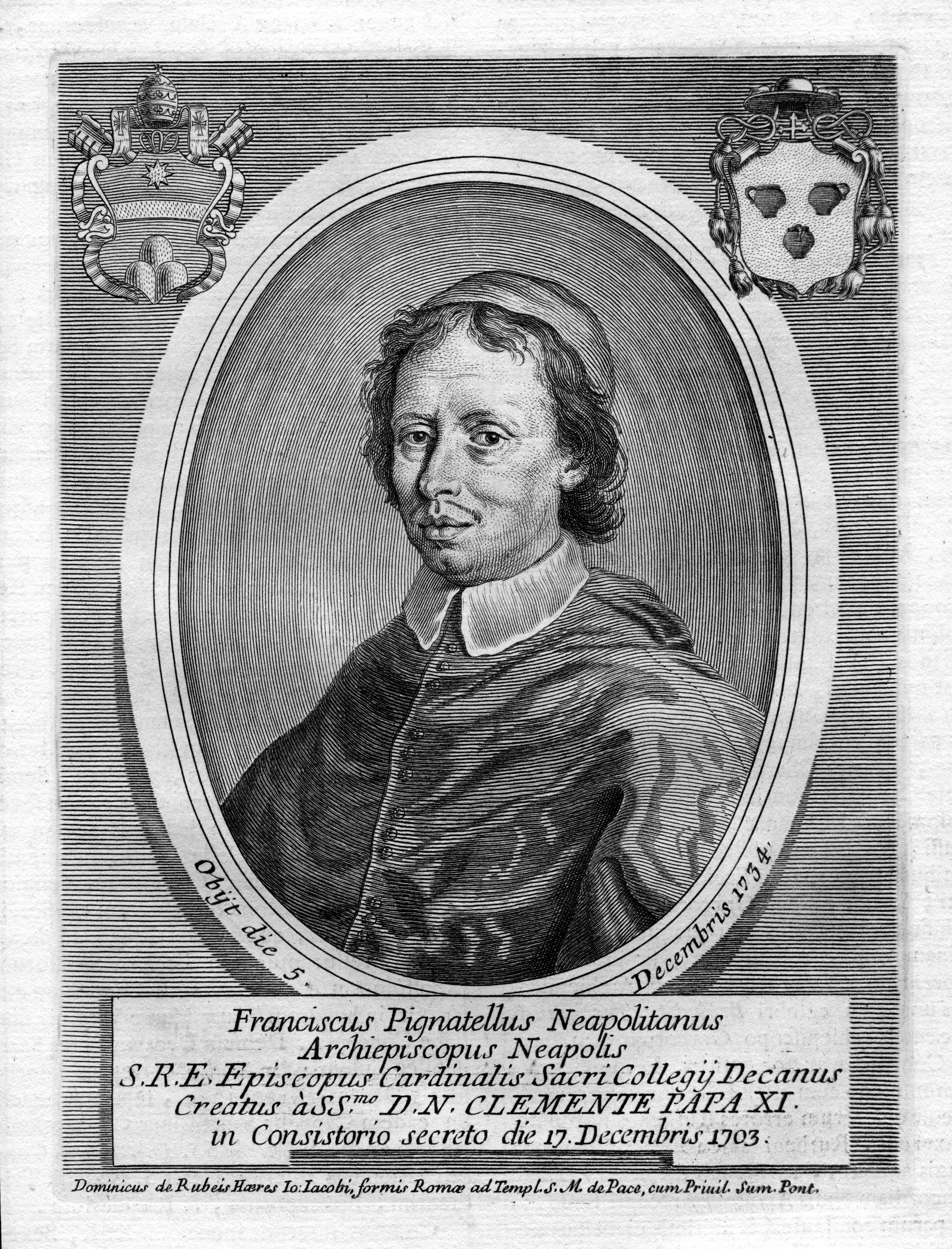
Francesco Pignatelli

Francesco Pignatelli (6 February 1652 – 15 December 1734) was an Italian cardinal from the House of Pignatelli.

== Early life ==
Pignatelli was born on 6 February 1652 at Senise, in the Province of Potenza. He was the youngest son of Giulio Pignatelli, 2nd Prince of Noia, and his fourth wife, Beatrice Carafa (1610–1679). Among his siblings was elder brother, Niccolò Pignatelli, 8th Duke of Monteleone.

== Career ==
Coat of arms of Francesco Pignatelli

In 1665, at the age of 13, Pignatelli entered the order of Theatines. On 27 September 1684, after being nominated by King Charles II of Spain, he was elected Archbishop of Taranto. He was recruited by Pope Clement XI to be nuncio to Poland, where he attempted to work on the schism between Catholics and Ruthenians (Ukrainians and Polish). On 19 February 1703 he was transferred to the metropolitan see of Naples and occupied it until his death.

Although he was fifth cousin of Pope Innocent XII (1691–1700), (Note: Pope Innocent XII's grandfather was the brother of Cardinal Francesco's great-grandfather, Giulio Pignatelli, 2nd Marquess of Cerchiara.) he was created cardinal only by his successor Clement XI on 17 December 1703. As cardinal he was awarded the titular priest for the church of Santi Marcellino e Pietro al Laterano (11 February 1704 – 26 April 1719), bishop of Sabina (26 April 1719 – 12 June 1724), bishop of Frascati (12 June 1724 – 19 November 1725) and bishop of Porto e Santa Rufina (from 19 November 1725 until his death).

In the papal conclave, 1721 Spain vetoed his election to the pontificate. He became Dean of the Sacred College of Cardinals in June 1726 but declined the promotion to the suburbicarian see of Ostia e Velletri (proper of the dean) and retained the see of Porto e S. Rufina.

== Personal life ==
He died at Naples on 15 December 1734.
