= 1721 conclave =

Election of Catholic Pope Innocent XIII

Papal conclave March–May 1721

Dates and location
- 31 March – 8 May 1721; Apostolic Palace, Papal States

Key officials
- Dean: Sebastiano Tanara
- Sub-dean: Pierfrancesco Orsini
- Camerlengo: Annibale Albani
- Protopriest: Galeazzo Marescotti
- Protodeacon: Benedetto Pamphili

Election
- Vetoed: Francesco Pignatelli; Fabrizio Paolucci
- Ballots: 75

Elected pope
- Michelangelo dei Conti; Name taken: Innocent XIII
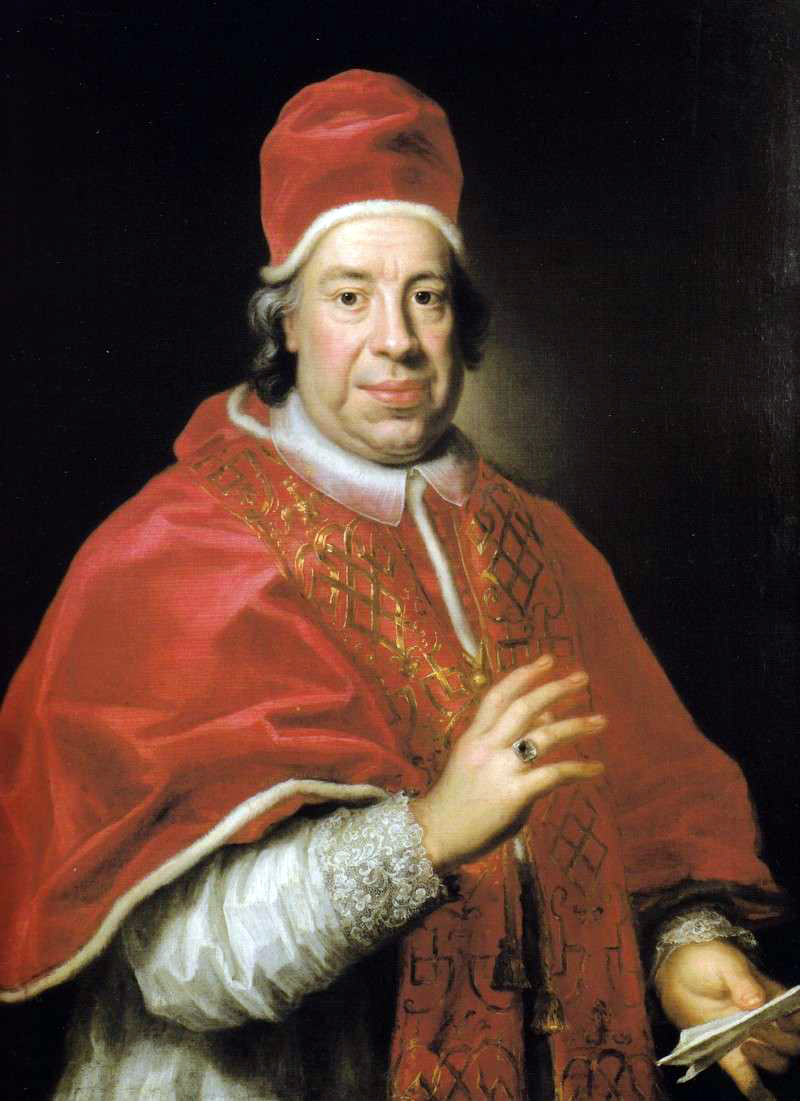

The 1721 papal conclave was called upon the death of Pope Clement XI. It began on 31 March 1721 and ended on 8 May that year with the election of Cardinal Michelangelo dei Conti as Pope Innocent XIII.

== Divisions in the College of Cardinals ==
The College of Cardinals was divided into four factions, two political and two curial. The Imperial faction, the strongest faction in the Sacred College, was headed by Imperial minister Althan; its strength was estimated between twenty and twenty five votes. They represented the interests of Charles VI, Holy Roman Emperor.

The Bourbon faction, the group of cardinals who defended the interests of the two Catholic powers ruled by Bourbon kings – France and Spain – included eleven or twelve cardinals. They represented the interests of Kings Louis XV of France and Philip V of Spain.

The Clementine party formed the third faction; Annibale Albani, Cardinal-nephew of Clement XI, was leader of the group of cardinals created by his uncle. Their number was estimated between eight and fifteen. Finally, the Zelanti formed the party of cardinals who opposed the secular influences on the Church. Their leader was Cardinal Fabroni. Its strength was estimated between six and twelve.

It was generally expected that the two curial factions, the Clementine and the Zelanti, would join their forces in the conclave.

== Papabili ==
As many as thirty cardinals were considered papabili, but among them Francesco Pignatelli was regarded as the general favourite. He was supported by Austria and had also many adherents among the Zelanti. Annibale Albani officially supported the candidate of Austria, but actually wanted to elect Fabrizio Paolucci, secretary of state of his uncle. Other candidates with serious chances for the election were Corsini, Tanara, Conti, Pamphili, Barbarigo and Gozzadini.

== Excommunicated cardinals ==
At the time of death of Pope Clement XI two cardinals, Giulio Alberoni and Louis Antoine de Noailles, were excommunicated. It was decided, however, that they should be invited to the conclave. Cardinal Noailles excused himself because of advanced age and poor health.

Another problem concerned Cardinal Vice-Chancellor Ottoboni: he was not yet ordained. But eventually he was also allowed to participate in the conclave.

== Conclave ==
Only twenty-seven cardinals entered the conclave on 31 March. By 9 April the number of electors reached only forty. Two last cardinals, Thomas Philip Wallrad de Hénin-Liétard d'Alsace and Damian Hugo Philipp von Schönborn, arrived only on 7 May.

Cardinal Annibale Albani, taking advantage of the small number of electors (mostly curial cardinals created by his uncle), tried to achieve a quick election of his candidate, Fabrizio Paolucci. In the first scrutiny conducted on 1 April in the morning Paolucci received eight votes in the ballot and two additional in the accessus. In the second scrutiny in the evening of the same day Paolucci was only three votes short of being elected. But at that time Cardinal Althan (the only Crown-Cardinal present in the early ballots) in the name of Emperor Charles VI pronounced the official exclusion against Paolucci.

The Imperial veto was very successful. On 2 April in the morning not a single vote fell to the Cardinal Secretary of State. On that same day the French Cardinal Rohan entered the conclave. He thanked Althan for his action against Paolucci.

During April several candidates were proposed – Spada, Gozzadini, Cornaro, Caracciolo – but none of them had been able to secure significant support. On 20 April Cardinal Cienfuegos arrived with the fresh instructions of the Imperial Court. At the end of this month it became clear that the best chances for the election was Cardinal Conti, proposed by the French faction. On 25 April Conti obtained seven votes. The Imperial faction, however, still awaited the arrival of their main candidate Pignatelli, and had instructions to vote for Conti only in the last instance. But when Pignatelli eventually joined the electors on 1 May, Spain officially excluded his candidature. The collapse of Pignatelli was decisive: the Imperial faction, admitting the impossibility of electing his candidate, agreed to vote for Conti. In the subsequent days the curial factions also promised their support for Conti.

== Election of Pope Innocent XIII ==
On 8 May in the morning, in the seventy-fifth ballot, Cardinal Michelangelo de' Conti was elected pope, receiving fifty-four votes out of fifty-five. The only vote against was his own, which he gave to Sebastiano Antonio Tanara, Dean of the College of Cardinals. He accepted his election and took the name of Innocent XIII, in honour of Pope Innocent III, also of the Conti family. A bit later Protodeacon Benedetto Pamphili announced his election to the people of Rome with the ancient formula Habemus Papam, and on 18 May he solemnly crowned him on the steps of the patriarchal Vatican Basilica.
