= Palazzo Spinelli di Laurino, Naples =

Palace in Naples, Italy

Coordinates: 40.8501°N 14.2556°E

The Palazzo Spinelli di Laurino is a palace, located on the corner of Via Nilo and Via dei Tribunali in central Naples, Italy. A palace at the site was first built in the 15th century, but the present layout, with an elliptical interior courtyard was commissioned by Trojano Spinelli. The courtyard recalls the interior of Palazzo Farnese of Caprarola. The structure is much altered, but still contains in the interior courtyard, a hint of former grandeur with dual ramp staircases, and statuary depicting virtues along rooflines, and a maiolica clock face on a triangular pediment surmounted by a Virgin of the Immaculate Conception.

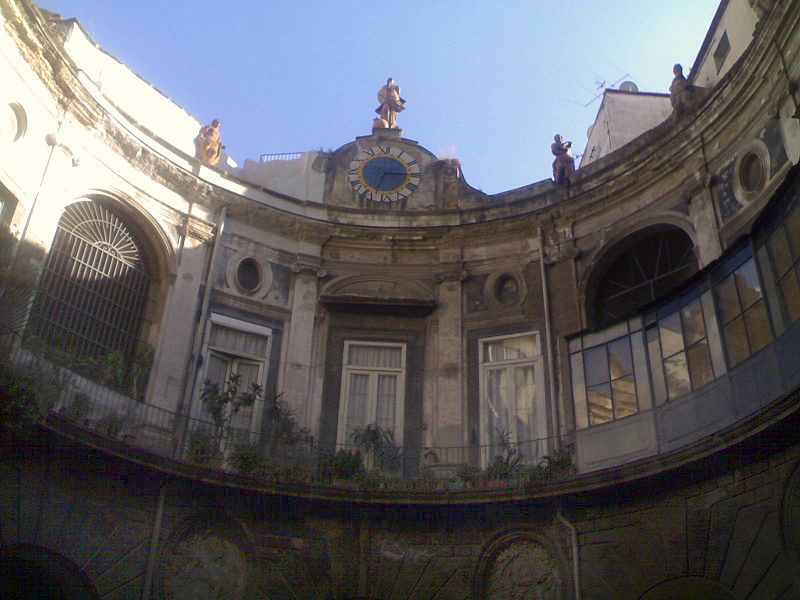
Inner courtyard.

The palace is just north of the Palazzo d’Afflitto, Palazzo del Panormita, and Palazzo di Ludovico di Bux (number 22) on the narrow alley that is Via Nilo.
