= Palazzo di Ludovico di Bux a via Nilo, Naples =

Palace in Naples, Italy

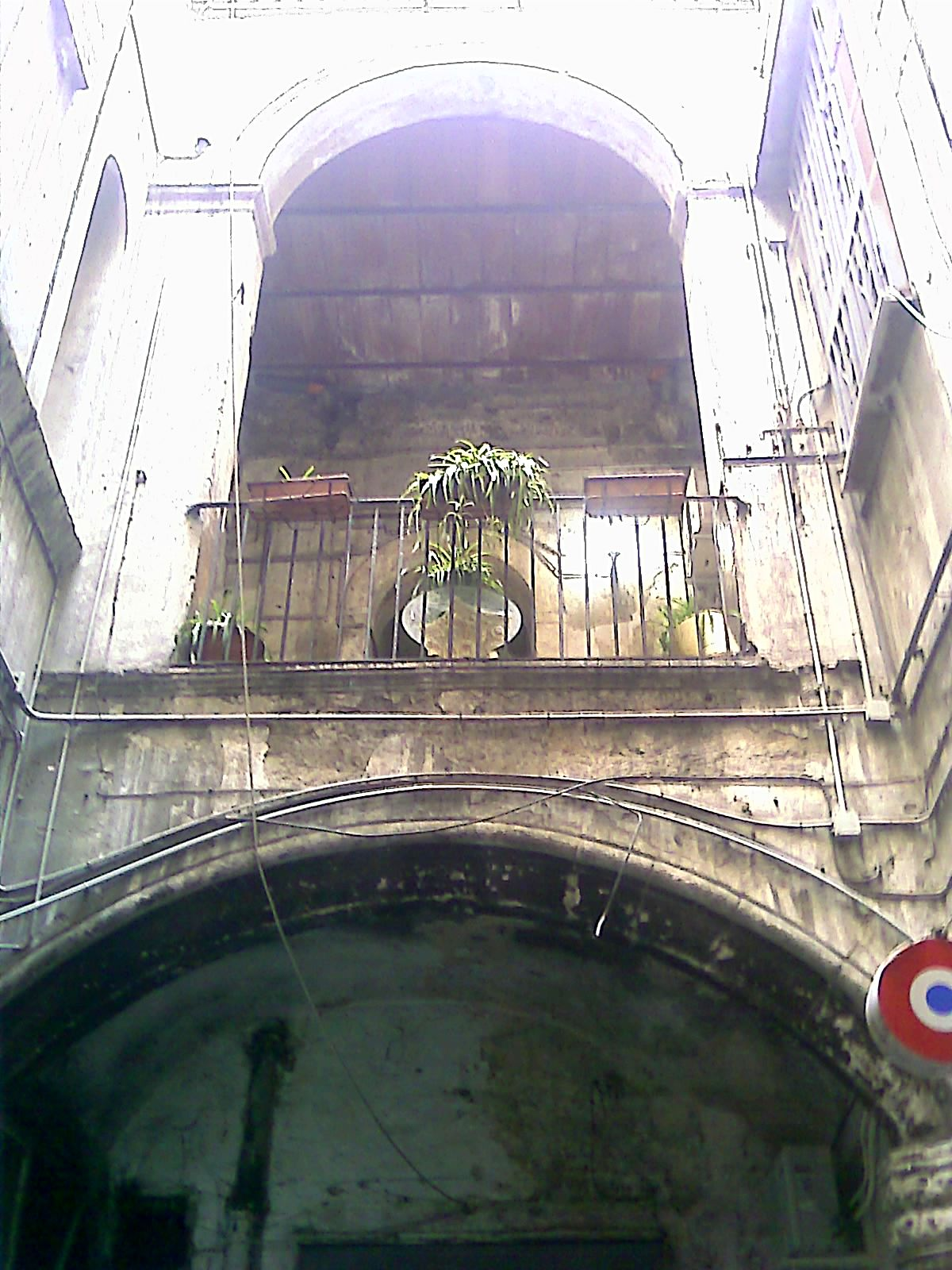
Palazzo Via Nilo 22, Loggia e arco ribassato

The Palazzo di Ludovico di Bux is a palace, located on vico Fico al Purgatorio, a street that leads to Santa Maria dei Pignatelli, and near the corner of Via Nilo (number 22), in central Naples, Italy.

The palace was once the property of the Mastrilli family, lords of Marigliano. Traces of a prior medieval building remain on the site, where the small church of San Galione a via Nilo once stood. The palace is now in a much decayed state. The palace is near the Palazzo d’Afflitto and Palazzo del Panormita on the narrow alley that is Via Nilo.
