= Palazzo del Panormita =

Palace in Naples, Italy

Coordinates: 40.848840°N 14.256100°E

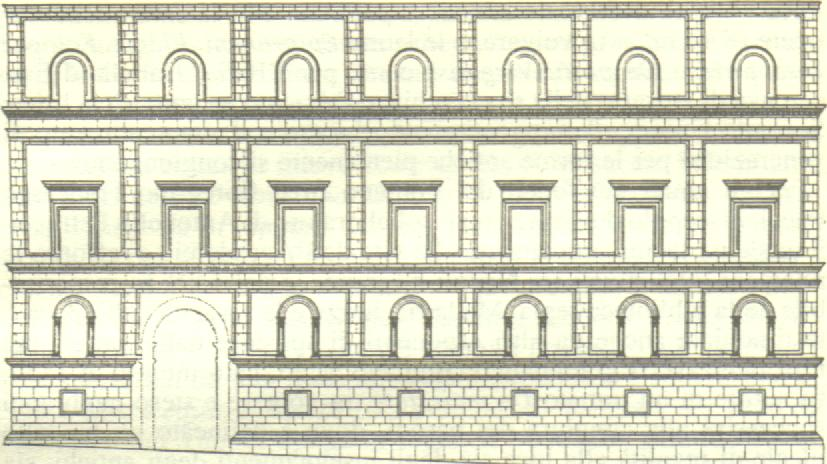
Facade design

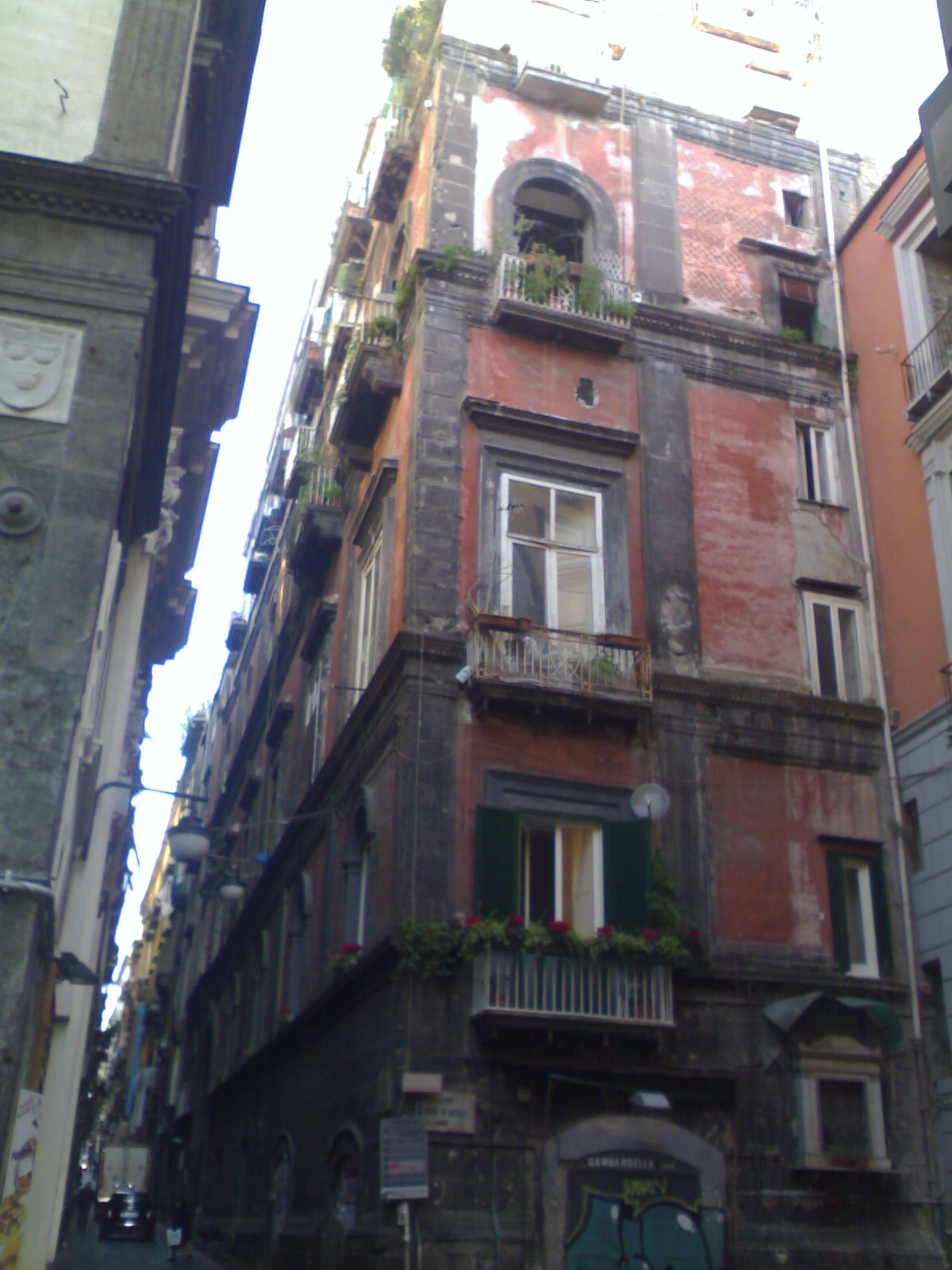
Facade on piazzetta Nilo

The Palazzo del Panormita is a Renaissance style palace in central Naples. It rises alongside the narrow via Nilo, near via Spaccanapoli, where it is called San Biagio dei Librai, diagonally from Santa Maria Assunta dei Pignatelli, adjacent to the Piazza del Nilo with the Nile God statue. It is south of Palazzo d’Afflitto and the Palazzo Spinelli di Laurino. The palace was initially commissioned prior to 1450 by Antonio Beccadelli, (1394–1471), called Il Panormita (poetic form meaning "The Palermitan"), who was a prominent Italian poet, canon lawyer, scholar, diplomat, and chronicler. It has since gone through many owners, including Giacomo Capece Galeota, a regent in the Tribunal of the Vicariate.

The initial architect was Giovanni Fillippo De Adinolfo, followed by Giovanni Francesco Mormando and Giovanni Francesco Di Palma who completed the work in the 16th century. The base of the structure has rough piperno rock. The piano nobile has the largest windows, while the third floor has arched windows. In the 1700s, a fourth story was added.
