= Troiano Spinelli =

Italian nobleman, philosopher, economist and historian

Trojano or Troiano Spinelli (22 December 1712 – 1 January 1777) was an Italian nobleman, philosopher, economist, and historian, active in Naples.

== Biography ==
He was born in Laurino to the aristocratic family of Spinelli, and, as the only son of his father Giuseppe and his mother Giovanna Caracciolo, in 1764 he inherited the titles of Duke of Aquara and of Laurino. In 1738, he had married Beatrice Caterina Pinto y Mendoza, a princess of Montacuto. After widowing, in 1750, he remarried with Donna Ottavia Tuttavilla, daughter of the Duke of Calabritto. His daughter Chiara Spinelli later the princess of Belmonte (1744–1823) was a painter, and for a time, mistress of Ferdinand I, King of the Two Sicilies.

Troiano studied in the Collegio Clementino of Rome under Giovanni Battista Vico, then moved to the Accademia di Loreto to study mathematics, physics and engineering. Returning to Naples, he entered the enlightenment circles including Gaetano Filangieri, Ferdinando Galiani, and the Prince of Sansevero Raimondo di Sangro. In his treatise on monetary policy, he opposed the reforms proposed by Carlo Antonio Broggia.

He renovated the family palace, the Palazzo Spinelli di Laurino in Naples. He died in 1777, and was buried in the family chapel in Santa Caterina a Formiello.

== Works ==
Spinelli wrote on a variety of subjects.

- Degli Affetti umani published by Stamperia Muziana, Naples, 1741.
- Riflessioni politiche sopra alcuni punti della scienza della moneta, Naples, 1750.
- Saggio di tavola cronologica de' principi e più ragguardevoli ufficiali che anno signoreggiato, e retto le provincie, che ora compongono il regno di Napoli published by stamperia di Giuseppe Di Bisogni, Naples, 1762.
- Della nobiltà published by stampe del Porsile, 1776.
- Lettera nella quale si dimostra non esser nota di falsità, che nel diploma di fondazione della chiesa di Bagnara si ritrovi l'anno 1085 segnato coll'indizione sesta correndo l'ottava del computo volgare
