= Irene Parenti Duclos =

Italian artist (1754–1795

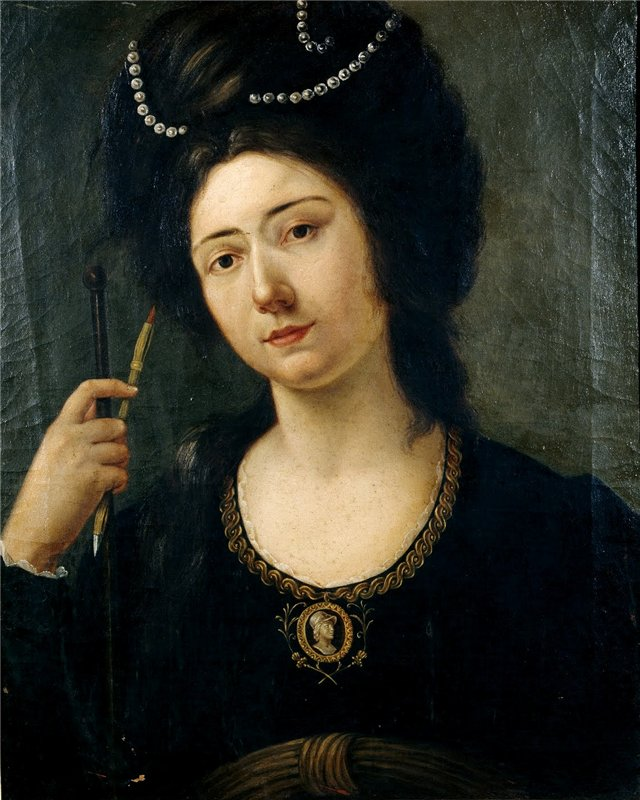
Self Portrait by Irene Parenti Duclos.

Irene Parenti Duclos (or Irene Parenti, or her academic nickname Lincasta Ericinia) (1754–1795) was an Italian painter and poet. Her work as an expert copyist of old master paintings was highly valued in her era, and brought her honors from several Italian art academies. Moreover, she achieved particular renown as a pioneer in the revival of encaustic painting.

== Career ==
Irene Parenti Duclos was the daughter of Tuscan painter Giuseppe Parenti, under whom she presumably received her earliest professional training. The first documented notice of Irene Parenti Duclos' painting activity is her 1773 petition to make painted replicas of works in Florence's Uffizi Gallery, where both male and female artists were permitted to set up their easels in its halls and copy old master paintings and ancient marble statues. Between 1773 and 1793, Duclos executed thirty-nine oil copies at the Uffizi, largely in response to the market demand for replicas from British Grand Tourists. In addition to conventional oil painting, Duclos practiced the ancient technique of encaustic painting, a rare skill she had learned while in Bologna in 1784-85 from the Spanish Jesuit antiquarian José María Pignatelli, who was canonized in 1954. Her achievements in this new field of encaustic painting brought Duclos rapid fame and her works in this technique garnered high prices. In 1785, Duclos' encaustic paintings were shown to English painter Emma Jane Greenland while she was visiting Florence; Greenland would go on to publicize the technique in England. A member of the art academies of Rome and Bologna as well as an "Accademico Professore" in Florence’s Accademia del Disegno since 1783, Duclos was additionally recognized for her poetic talents with an induction into the literary circle of the Accademia degli Arcadi.

== Original works ==
Duclos’ Portrait of Joseph Hilarius Eckel (Galleria degli Uffizi, Inv. 1890, no. 311), a Jesuit numismatist from Vienna, was commissioned in 1773 by the Uffizi's director Raimondo Cocchi for the gallery's portrait series of "Famous Men" . Duclos’ signed and dated 1783 Self-portrait (Galleria degli Uffizi, Inv. 1890, no. 5556; currently in storage) depicts the artist holding the tools of her trade while dressed elegantly with an intaglio jewel depicting Mercury and an elegant coiffure. This picture was originally displayed in the Accademia del Disegno in the frame that still holds it today; here, Duclos' portrait was hung between those of two other female academicians: engraver Anna Borghigiani and pastellist Chiara Spinelli. Another self-portrait (Galleria degli Uffizi, Inv. 1890, no. 6856) has recently been attributed to her as well.

== Madonna del Sacco ==
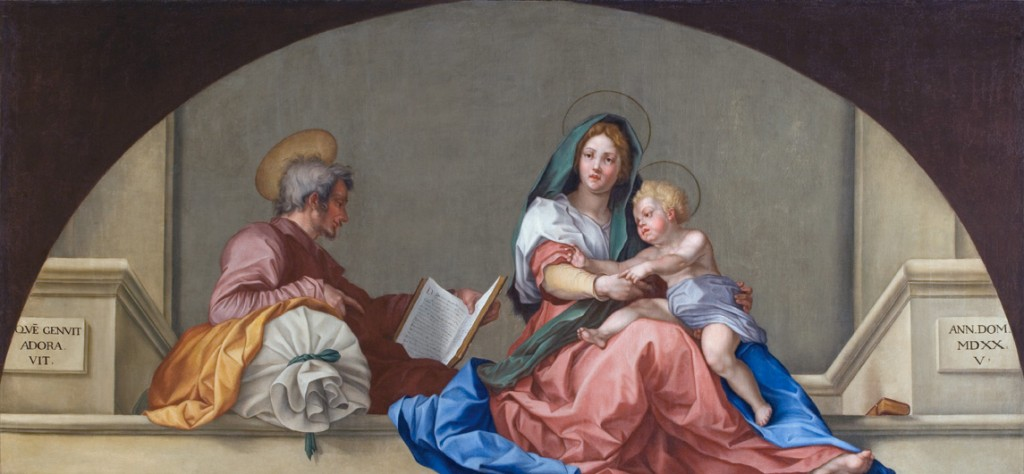
Copy of Andrea del Sarto’s Madonna del Sacco by Irene Parenti Duclos.

Irene Parenti Duclos’ Copy of Andrea del Sarto’s Madonna del Sacco, displayed in the gypsoteque of the Galleria dell'Accademia in Florence, is this museum’s only work by a woman artist on permanent view. Begun in 1779 and completed by 1780, the work is a full-size copy of Andrea del Sarto’s 1525 fresco in the Chiostro Grande of the Basilica of the Santissima Annunziata. Duclos made the work for herself, but several years later in 1781 it was offered to Grand Duke Pietro Leopoldo for sale through the intervention of Giuseppe Pelli Bencivenni, then director of the Uffizi. The Grand Duke purchased Duclos' painting for 100 gold zecchini and displayed it in the Pitti Palace, where it hung until 1863 . In 1983, it was moved to Florence’s Galleria dell'Accademia.

== Restoration and recent discoveries ==
Irene Parenti Duclos’ Copy of Andrea del Sarto’s Madonna del Sacco was restored in May 2011 by the Advancing Women Artists Foundation and Dr. Jane Fortune. A simultaneous restoration of Andrea del Sarto's original, sponsored by Friends of Florence, allowed for the thorough comparison between the two works. Research carried out during the restoration suggests that Duclos traced the design of the original fresco onto paper, transferred the traced design onto her canvas using the spolvero technique, and carried out the painting within proximity to the original to achieve a close chromatic resemblance . The restoration was the subject of a documentary film, Irene Parenti Duclos: A Work Restored, An Artist Revealed, produced by Art Media Studio and based on the book by the same name that was published by the Advancing Women Artists Foundation and The Florentine Press.

== In popular culture ==
In 2006, Italian playwright Alberto Macchi published his script for a play based loosely on the biographical research he conducted on Irene Parenti Duclos. A segment featuring the life and works of Irene Parenti Duclos is part of the PBS television special Invisible Women: Forgotten Artists of Florence, an Emmy Award-winning program (2013) based on the 2009 book of the same title by Jane Fortune.
