= Emma Jane Greenland =

British painter, writer and singer (1760–1843)

Emma Jane Greenland Hooker
- Born: Emma Jane Greenland; 1760; London, England
- Died: 9 September 1838 (aged 77–78); Brighton, Sussex, England
- Occupations: painter, writer, singer
- Spouse: Rev. Thomas Redman Hooker
- Writing career
- Language: English
- Subject: encaustic painting

Emma Jane Greenland (after marriage, Hooker; 1760/61 – 9 September 1838) was an English painter, writer and singer. She was the author of Curious Discovery of the Ancient Grecian Method of Painting on Wax (encaustic painting). Greenland may have been a pupil of Johann Christian Bach, and she owned some of his manuscripts after his death. She was awarded a Gold Pallet on 14 November 1786 by the Royal Society for the Encouragement of Arts, Manufactures and Commerce.

== Early life and education ==
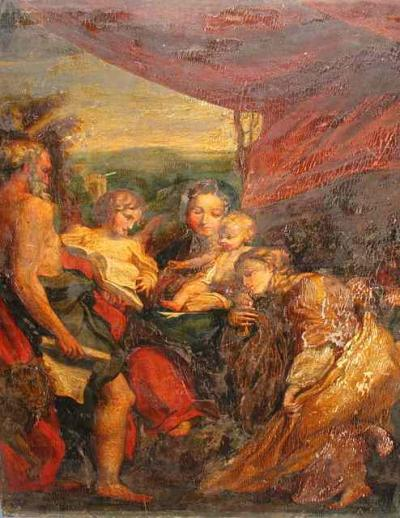
"Madonna and child with Saint John and cherub" on a panel by Greenland

Emma Jane Greenland was born in London in 1760. Her father is thought to be Augustus Greenland, although other records show she was probably born in 1761 to Augustine Greenland (one of the Deputy Tellers of His Majesty's Exchequer) and Sarah (Hooker), being baptised on 6 August 1761 at St Andrew Holborn (church), London, England.

In the decade from 1772 to 1782, she studied painting with Francesco Bartolozzi at the Incorporated Society of Artists in London as well as with Giovanni Battista Cipriani and Giovan Battista Capezzuoli at the gallery of the Duke of Richmond. In order to perfect her work, she moved to Italy and in 1783, in Rome, began studying encaustic painting with Joseph Pignatelli. In 1785, in Florence, she practiced encaustic painting at the salon of Irene Parenti Duclos and thanks to her, Hooker began to attend the Royal Gallery.

== Career ==
She returned to London in 1786, and in the following year, published Curious Discovery of the Ancient Grecian Method of Painting on Wax. Greenland also exhibited her self-portrait, at the Royal Academy of Arts in London as an Honorary Exhibitor.

Her first communication to the Society for the Encouragement of Arts, Manufactures, and Commerce of London, with examples of this mode of painting, was made in the year 1786, one example of which was preserved in the Society's rooms at the Adelphi. For her very successful efforts in encaustic painting, Greenland was presented with a gold palette by the Society in 1786. Her account was printed in the 10th volume of the Society's Transactions for the year 1792. In the year 1807, she made a farther communication to the Society of the result of no less than 50 experiments per day, during more than four months. It was proposed that this method of painting should be called the Hookerian method.

From 1801, with her husband, she directed a school for young aristocracy in Sussex. Greenland's music career gave her great satisfaction as when Johann Christian Bach dedicated to her six sonatas for piano and violin. Her father was a witness to Bach's will and Emma wrote her name on the title page of each document and at the head of each movement. Emma may have been a pupil of Bach's.

== Personal life ==
On 24 March 1802, Emma Jane gave birth to a son who was baptised George Trigge Hooker on 28 March 1802 in Rottingdean, East Sussex, England. A petition to the King in 1820 resulted in George Trigge Hooker becoming known as George Trigge Greenland, in honour of his maternal grandfather, Augustine Greenland.

Emma Jane Hooker née Greenland died on 9 September 1838 in Brighton, Sussex and was buried in the Greenland family vault, 15 September 1838 at All Saints Church, Carshalton, Surrey, England, in accordance with her last will and testament.

== Selected works ==
- Curious Discovery of the Ancient Grecian Method of Painting on Wax, 1787
