= Santa Maria Donnalbina =

Church building in Naples, Italy

Church of Santa Maria Donnalbina
- Chiesa di Santa Maria Donnalbina
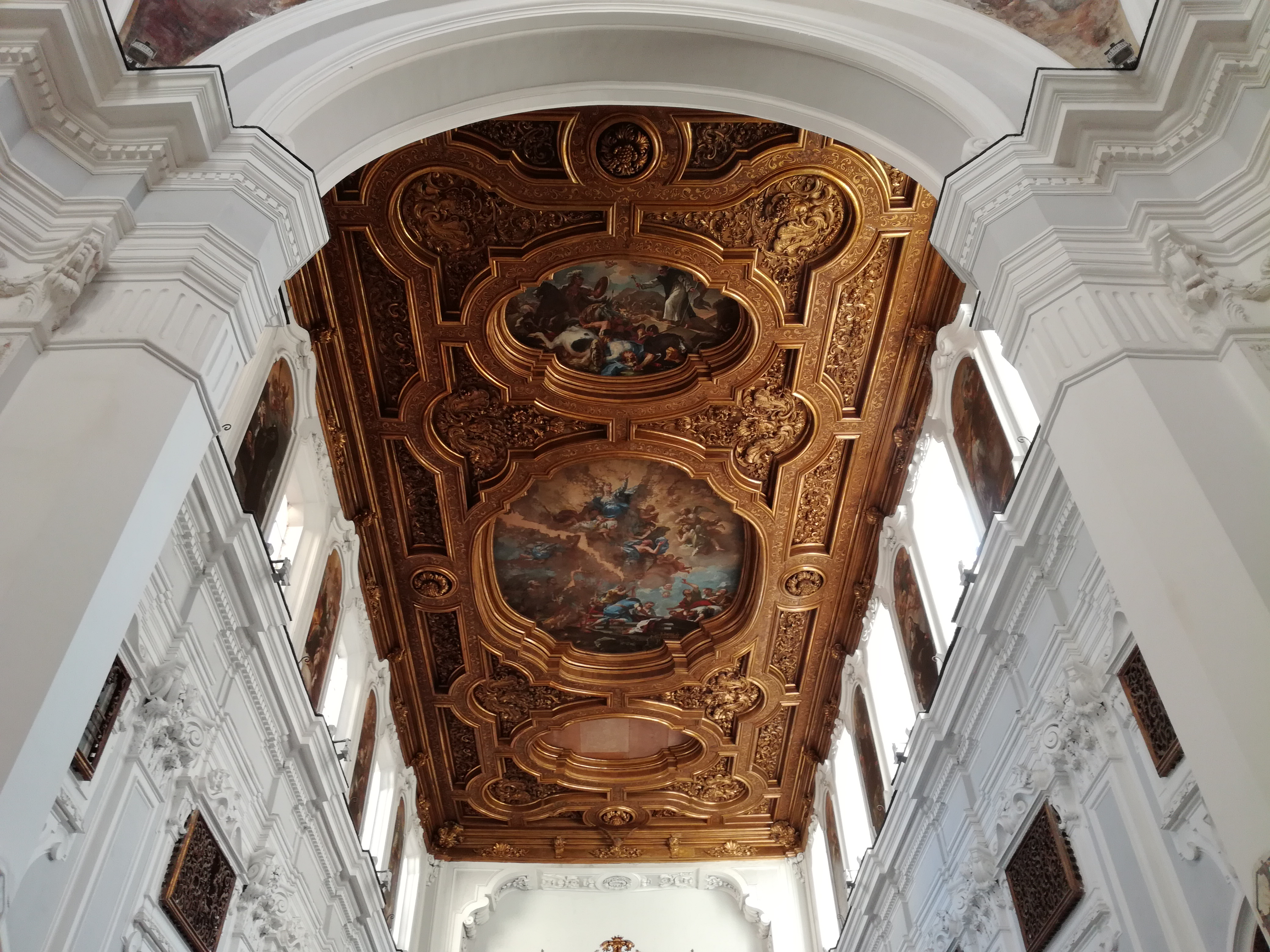
- Ceiling with cassetoni of paintings.
- Church of Santa Maria Donnalbina
- 40.844575°N 14.252553°E
- Location: Naples; Province of Naples, Campania
- Country: Italy
- Denomination: Roman Catholic

History
- Status: Active

Architecture
- Architectural type: Church
- Style: Baroque architecture

Administration
- Diocese: Roman Catholic Archdiocese of Naples

Santa Maria Donnalbina is a church located on the street of the same name in Naples, Italy.

A church at the site existed in the 9th century, but was reconstructed in the 17th century by Bartolomeo Picchiatti, and the Baroque style church underwent further reconstructions under Arcangelo Guglielmelli.

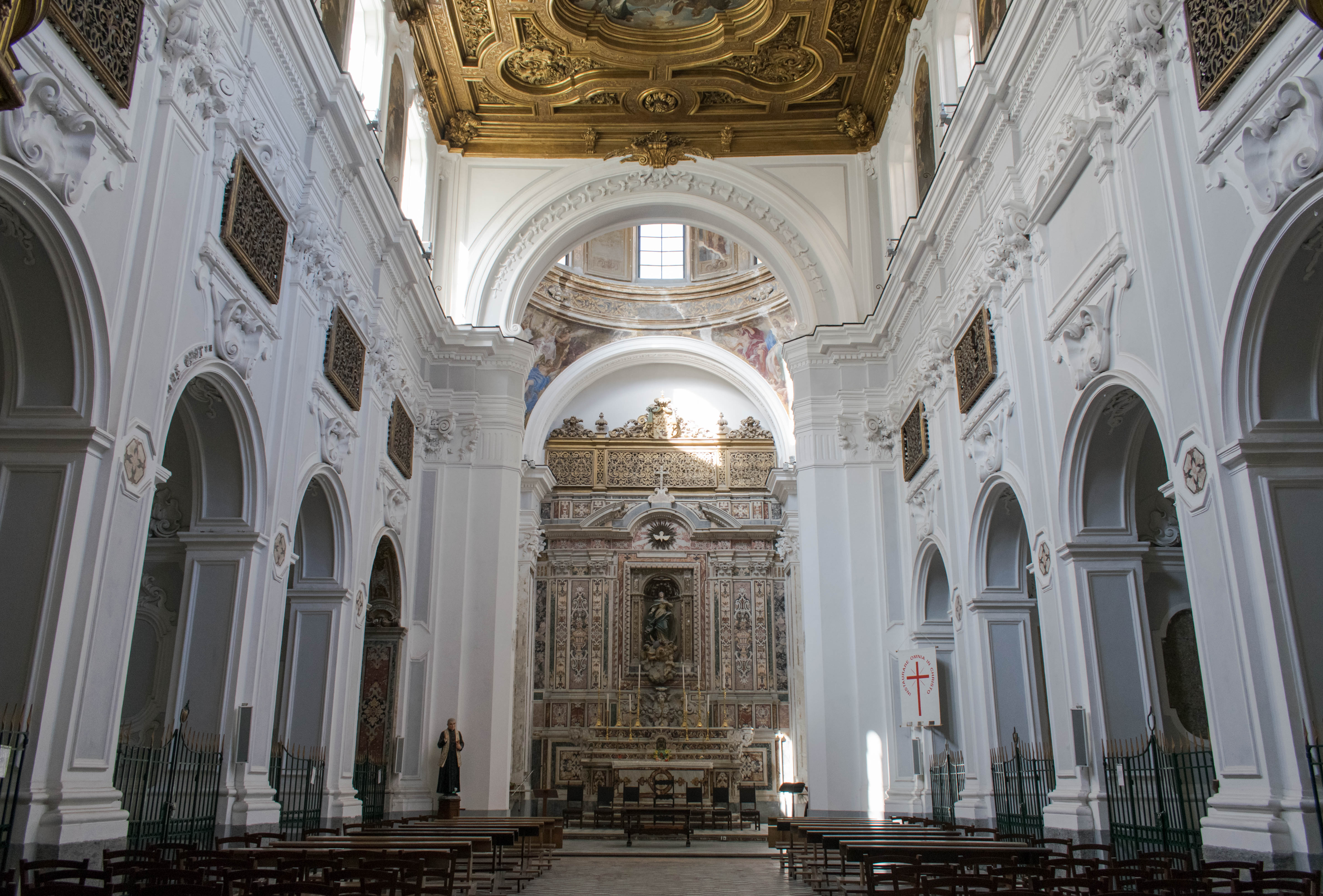
Interior

The interior was heavily encrusted with stucco decorations (1701) by Antonio Guidetti, and the altar is made of polychrome marbles. The counterfacade has an organ from 1699. The ceiling was decorated with canvases by Nicola Malinconico, also the author of the paintings depicting the saints, as well as the fresco in the counter-facade. In the second chapel on right are two saints (1736) painted by Domenico Antonio Vaccaro; in the presbytery and transepts are frescoes and canvases by Francesco Solimena.

The church holds the funereal monument of Giovanni Paisiello, sculpted in Neoclassic style by Angelo Viva in 1816, which originally stood in the small church of the Immacolata del Terz'Ordine di San Francesco, which was torn down during the opening of via Guglielmo Sanfelice during the so-called Risanamento of Naples, in which a rationalizing enlargement of streets was attempted. The church, closed since 1972, has been reopened to the public after 2010.

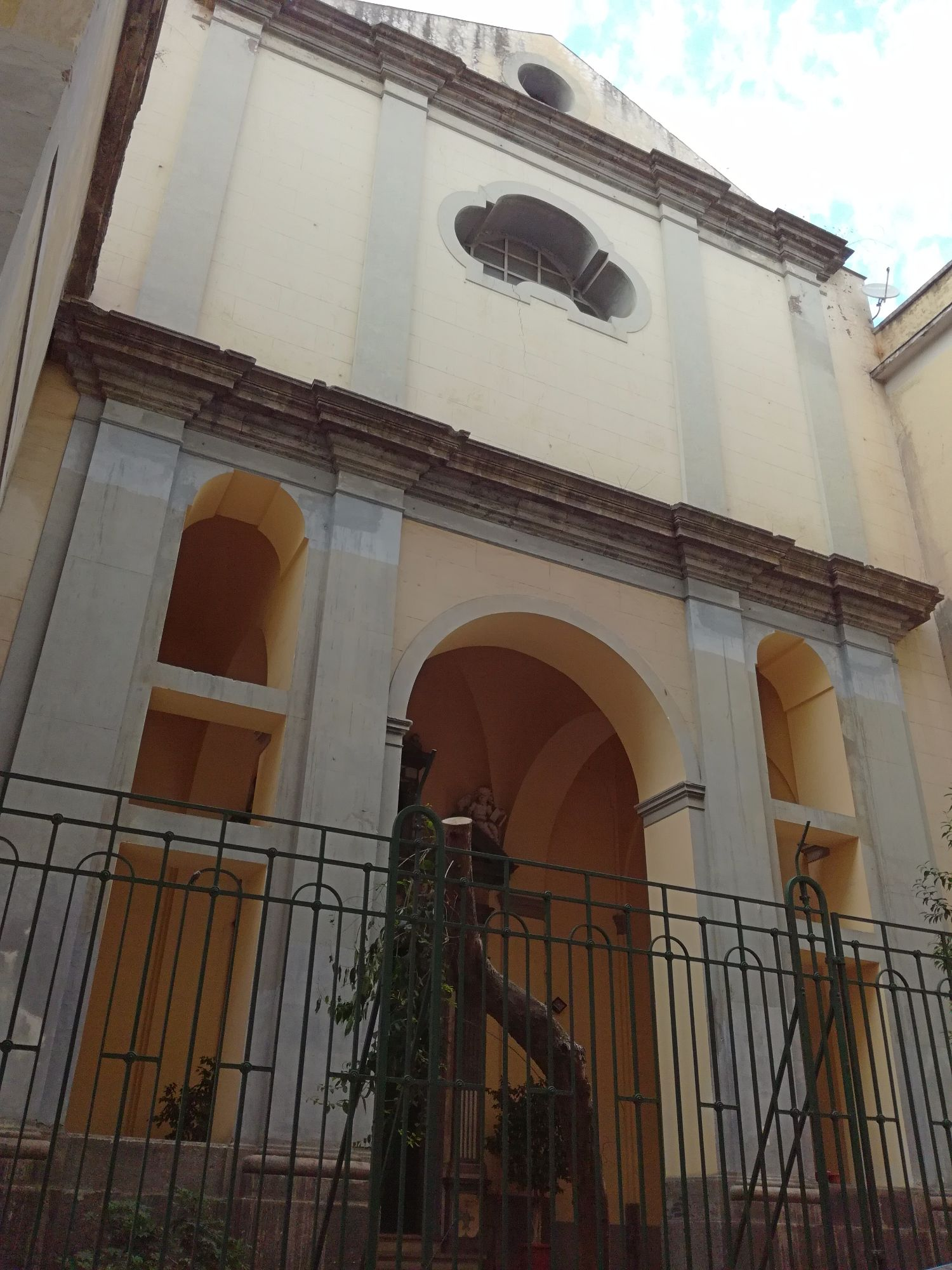
Exterior

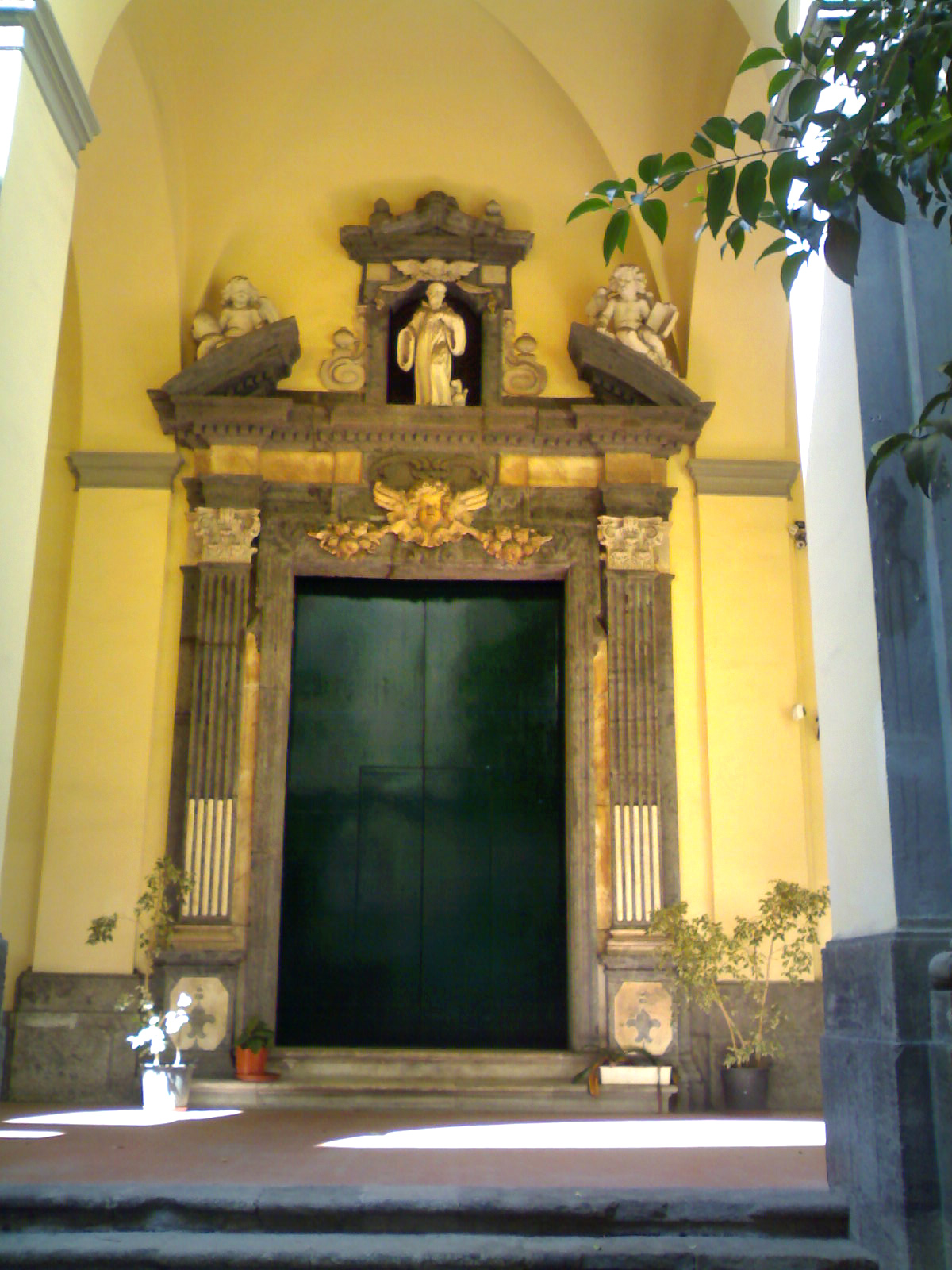
Entrance portal

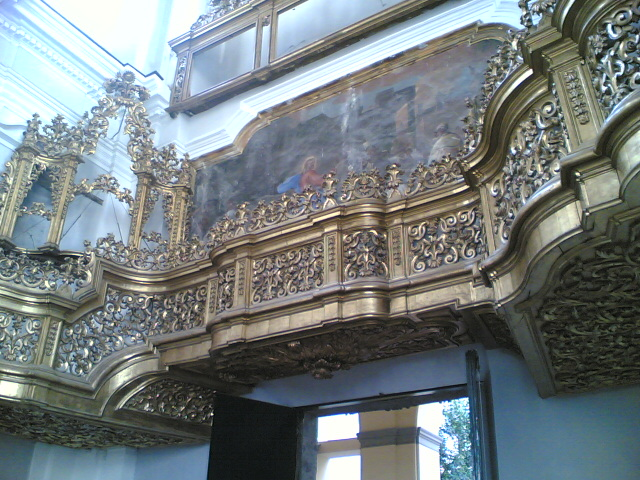
Choir

== Bibliography ==
- Vincenzo Regina, Le chiese di Napoli. Viaggio indimenticabile attraverso la storia artistica, architettonica, letteraria, civile e spirituale della Napoli sacra, Newton and Compton editor, Naples 2004.
