= Santi Marco e Andrea a Nilo =

Church in Naples, Italy

Coordinates: 40.848288°N 14.256205°E

The church of Santi Marco e Andrea a Nilo is a former Roman Catholic church, located on via Paladino #50 in central Naples, Italy. It is less than a block east of the Santa Maria Assunta dei Pignatelli church.

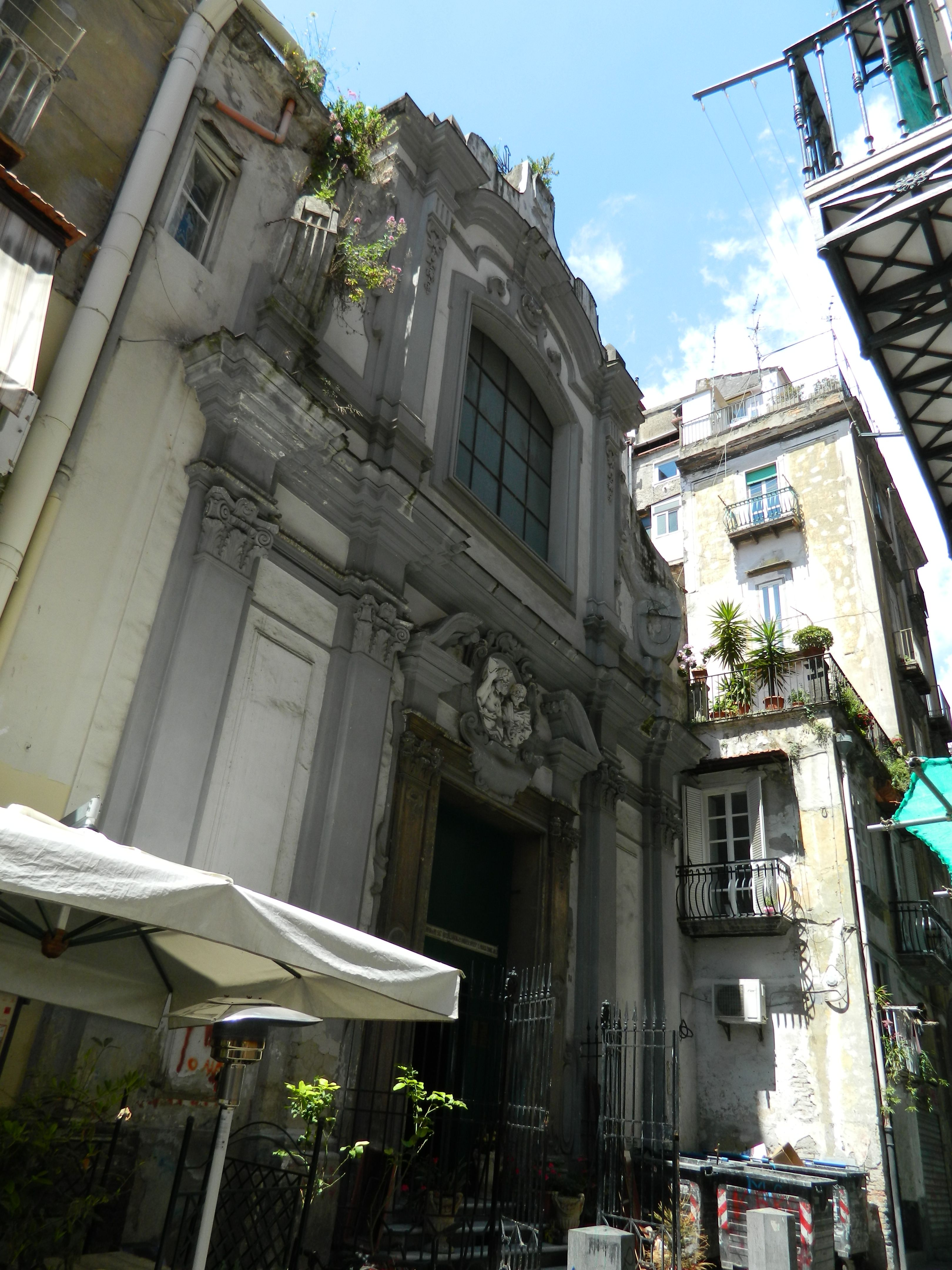
Façade

== History ==
A church at the site was initially built in the 6th century and dedicated to St Andrew the Apostle. It has had diverse custodians over the centuries, from the representative of the Pope, to various monastic orders, including Byzantine monks who had fled the Eastern Roman Empire during the Iconoclastic Controversy. By the 17th century, it had been ceded to the Contraternity degli Osti e dei Tavernari (Innkeepers), who dedicated the church also to their patron, St Mark the Evangelist.

This confraternity funded a reconstruction and decoration of the church in Baroque style. The interior once held an altarpiece, now lost, by Francesco Curia, depicting St Mark and St Andrew before the Virgin. The church has a sarcophagus that putatively held the remains of Santa Candida the elder. Much of the interior frescoes have suffered damage from humidity. The confraternity abandoned the church in 1957. The church suffered damage during the earthquake of November 23, 1980, and was rebuilt under the supervision of the architect Adriano De Rose. The church is now affiliated with the Orthodox Church of the Patriarch of Bucharest.
