= Angelo Viva =

Italian sculptor

- Born: 1748; Naples, Kingdom of Naples
- Died: 27 February 1837 (aged 88–89); Naples, Kingdom of the Two Sicilies
- Known for: Sculpture

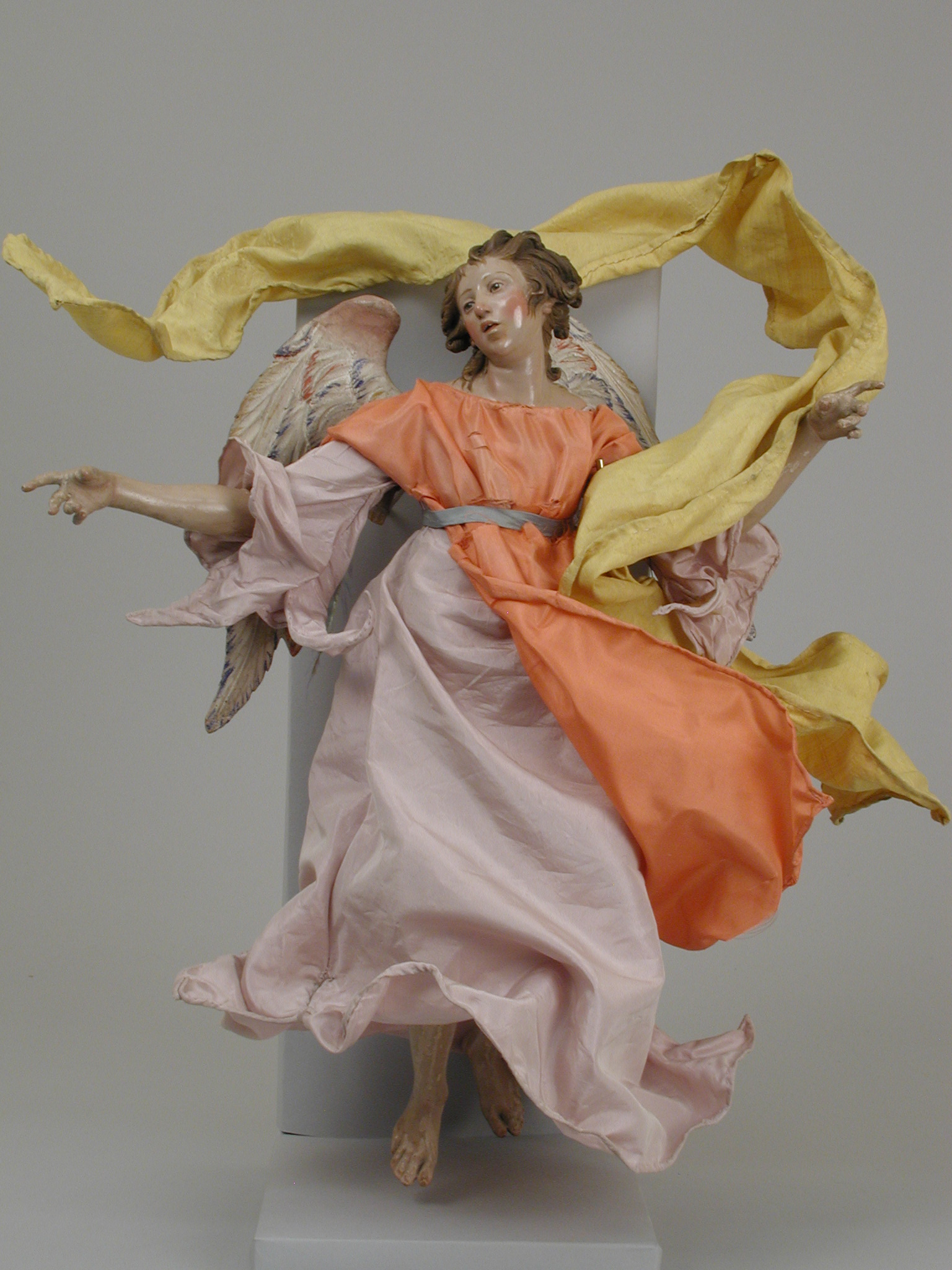
Angel

Angelo Viva (1748 in Naples, Italy - 27 February 1837 in Naples, Italy) was an Italian sculptor. His important works are the statuary La fontana del ratto di Europa, the Statues of the Evangelists in the Chapel Pappacoda, the decorations of the Obelisk of Portosalvo and the funeral monument of Giovanni Paisiello visible today in the church of Santa Maria Donnalbina. He also carried out a restoration of the Nile God Statue, Naples. He also did the facades of the Santa Maria di Montesanto, Naples.
