= Chiara Spinelli =

Italian artist (1744–1823)

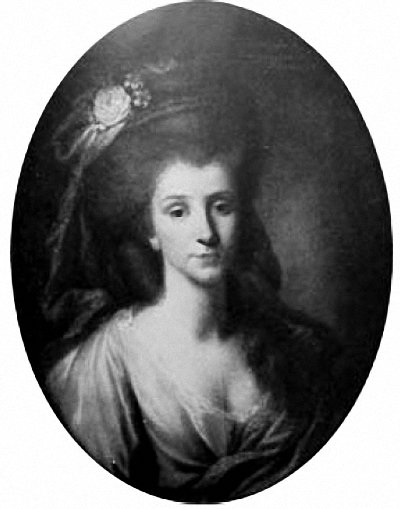
Self-portrait in the Uffizi

Chiara Spinelli (1744-1823), later the Princess of Belmonte, was an Italian noblewoman and artist, especially noted as a pastellist.

Spinelli was born in Naples, the daughter of Troiano, the ninth Duke of Laurino, who also published in philosophy. In 1762 she married Antonio Francesco Pignatelli, the prince of Belmonte, becoming his second wife. He died in 1794. She was also the mistress of Ferdinand I of the Two Sicilies.

She took part in the revolution which led to the creation of the Parthenopean Republic in 1799; at its collapse she was exiled to France. Even after her exile she remained involved in political intrigue, and was noted by French police as one of the Neapolitan exiles who were part of a conspiracy plotting to invade and overtake Naples.

A self-portrait by Spinelli is held in the collection of the Uffizi in Florence; it was originally displayed alongside those of Irene Parenti Duclos and Anna Borghigiani.

Spinelli was also an active patron of arts and literature; she hosted a salon, and sponsored composers such as Niccolo Piccinni.
