= Nile God Statue, Naples =

Ancient statue in Naples

Statue of the Nile God
- Statua del dio Nilo (Italian)
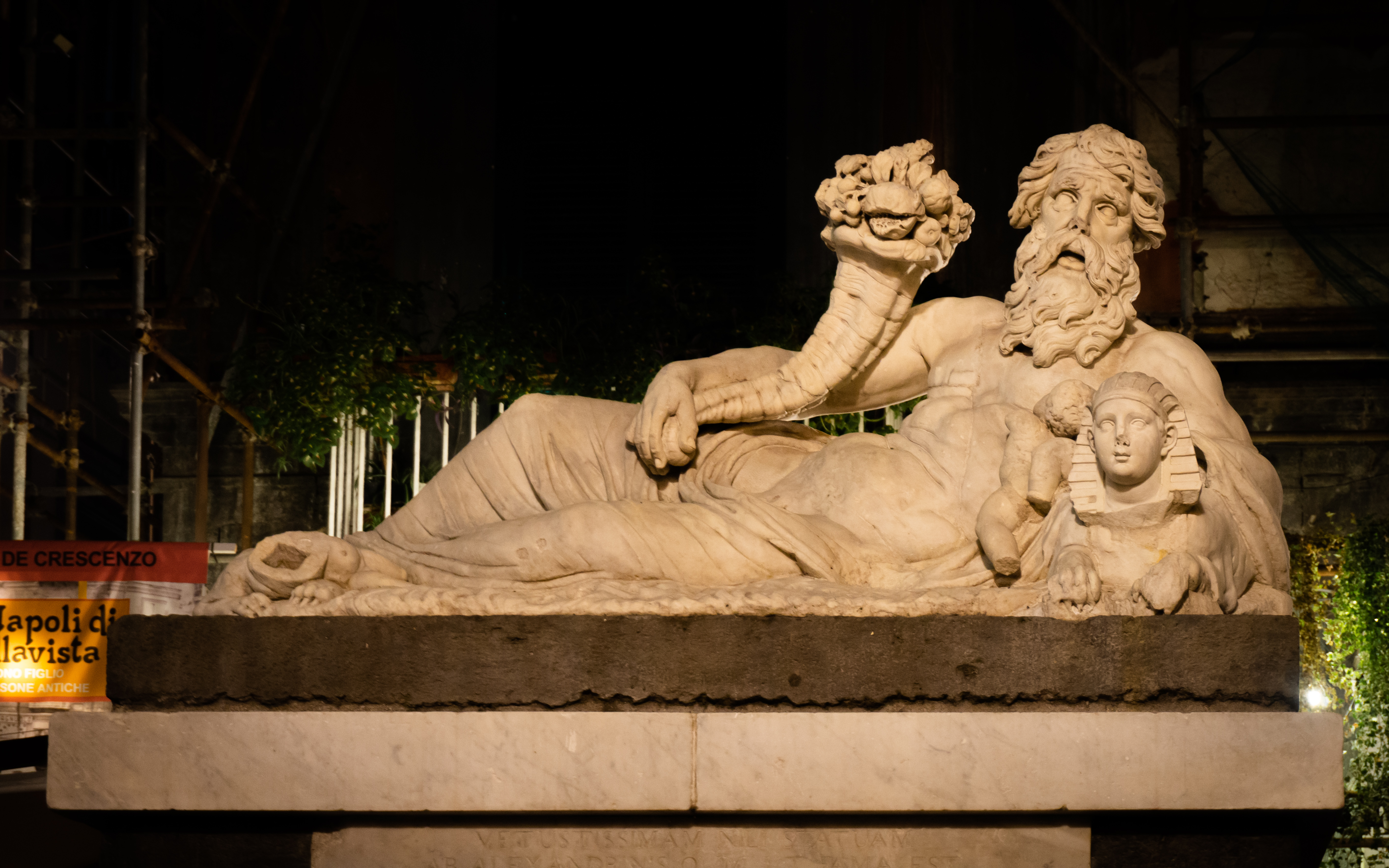
- The Nile God Statue in the centre of Largo Corpo di Napoli
- Artist: Unknown
- Completion date: 2nd–3rd century
- Medium: marble
- Movement: Hellenistic art
- Location: Naples
- 40.848752°N 14.256096°E

The Statue of the Nile God (Italian: Statua del dio Nilo) is an Ancient Roman marble statue dating from the 2nd century AD.

It is located at Piazzetta Nilo (Largo Corpo di Napoli), at the start of via Nilo, in the quarter of the same name, and it is this statue that gives all their name. The church of Santa Maria Assunta dei Pignatelli faces the statue, and the Palazzo del Panormita is on the north flank. Two blocks east, along Via Benedetto Croce (part of the Decumano Inferiore commonly called Spaccanapoli) rises the church of San Domenico Maggiore.

== History ==
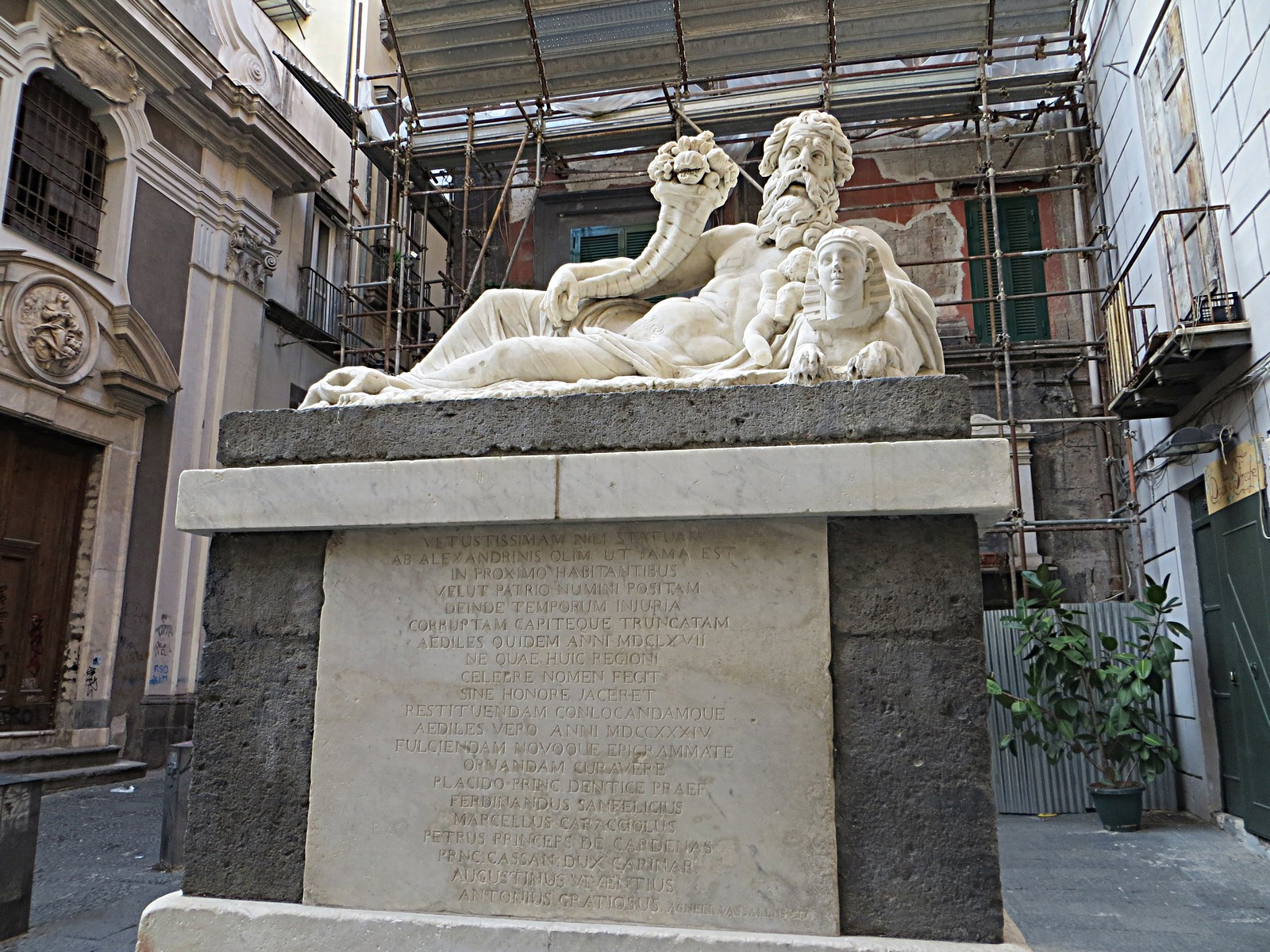
The statue seen in his urban context.

The statue represents the God of the Nile, recumbent with a cornucopia and lying on a sphinx. The statue was probably erected in the then Roman port city by Alexandrian merchants in the 2nd century. It was recovered, headless, in 1476, and was nicknamed Corpo di Napoli. The interpretation for the nickname is that the headless statue was thought to be a female representation of the city breastfeeding its children – hence the Corpo di Napoli ('body of naples').

It was placed upon a pedestal in 1657, and later that century a bearded head was sculpted. The sculptor of the head was Bartolomeo Mori. Later restoration was performed in the 18th-century by Angelo Viva.

In recent times, the statue was restored twice: First in 1993, and then in 2013 after the Carabinieri Command for the Protection of Cultural Heritage had recovered the head of the sphinx in Austria, which had disappeared in the 1950s. On 15 November 2014, a public ceremony for the completion of the restoration was held.

A higher quality version of the same topic, also Ancient Roman, is found in the Vatican Museums. Both statues are copies of an original from Alexandria, Egypt.

== Inscription ==
The inscription under the statue reads:

Vetustissimam Nili Statuam
Ab Alexandrinis Olim Ut Fama Est
In Proximo Habitantibus
Velut Patrio Numini Positam
Deinde Temporum Injuria
Corruptam Capiteque Truncatam
Aediles Quidem Anni MDCLXVII
Ne Quae Huic Regioni
Celebre Nomen Fecit
Sine Honore Jaceret
Restituendam Conlocandamque
Aediles Vero Anni MDCCXXXIV
Fulciendam Novoque Epigrammate
Ornandum Curavere
Placido Princ. Dentice Praef.
Ferdinandus Sanfelicius
Marcellus Caracciolus
Petrus Princeps De Cardenas
Princ. Cassan. Dux Carinar.
Augustinus Viventius
Antonius Gratiosus. Agnell. Vassallus Sec.

— Inscription of the statue

The earlier 1667 inscription of this statue – referenced in the current inscription – is recorded in travel writings of Johann Georg Keyßler (mid 18th-century) still noting a crocodile, which is absent today:

Vetustissimam Nili Statuam vides,
At capite nuper auctam non suo
Hoc scilicet Nili fatum est
Suum quod occulat caput
Alieno spectari;
Ne tamen observandum antiquitatis monumentum
Quod proximæ Nobilium sedi nomen fecit.
Statuæ Truncus jaceret ignobilis
Elegantiori exornatum cultu
Urbani Ædiles voluerunt
Anno D. MDCLVII

You see the very old statue of the Nile,
But the newly enlarged head is not his own
This, of course, has been his fate
Because he hides his head
To be seen with a stranger's;
Furthermore, so that this monument of antiquity
That made the name for the nearby noble Seggios
Would not lie as the ignoble speckles of the statue
The Ædiles ordered it to be more elegantly decorated
In the year of our Lord 1657

— Earlier inscription of the statue

== Gallery ==
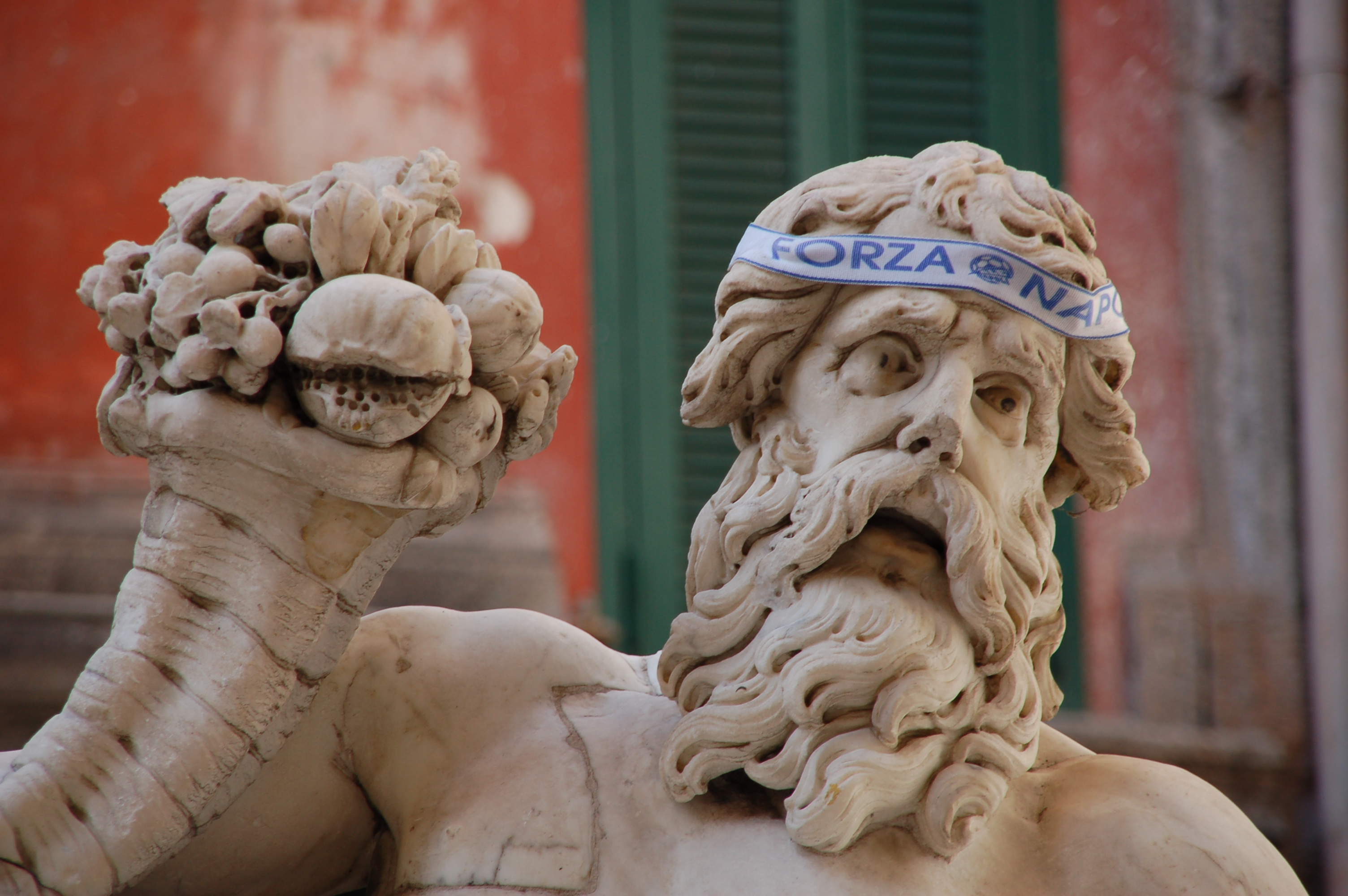
Detail of the Nile God's head

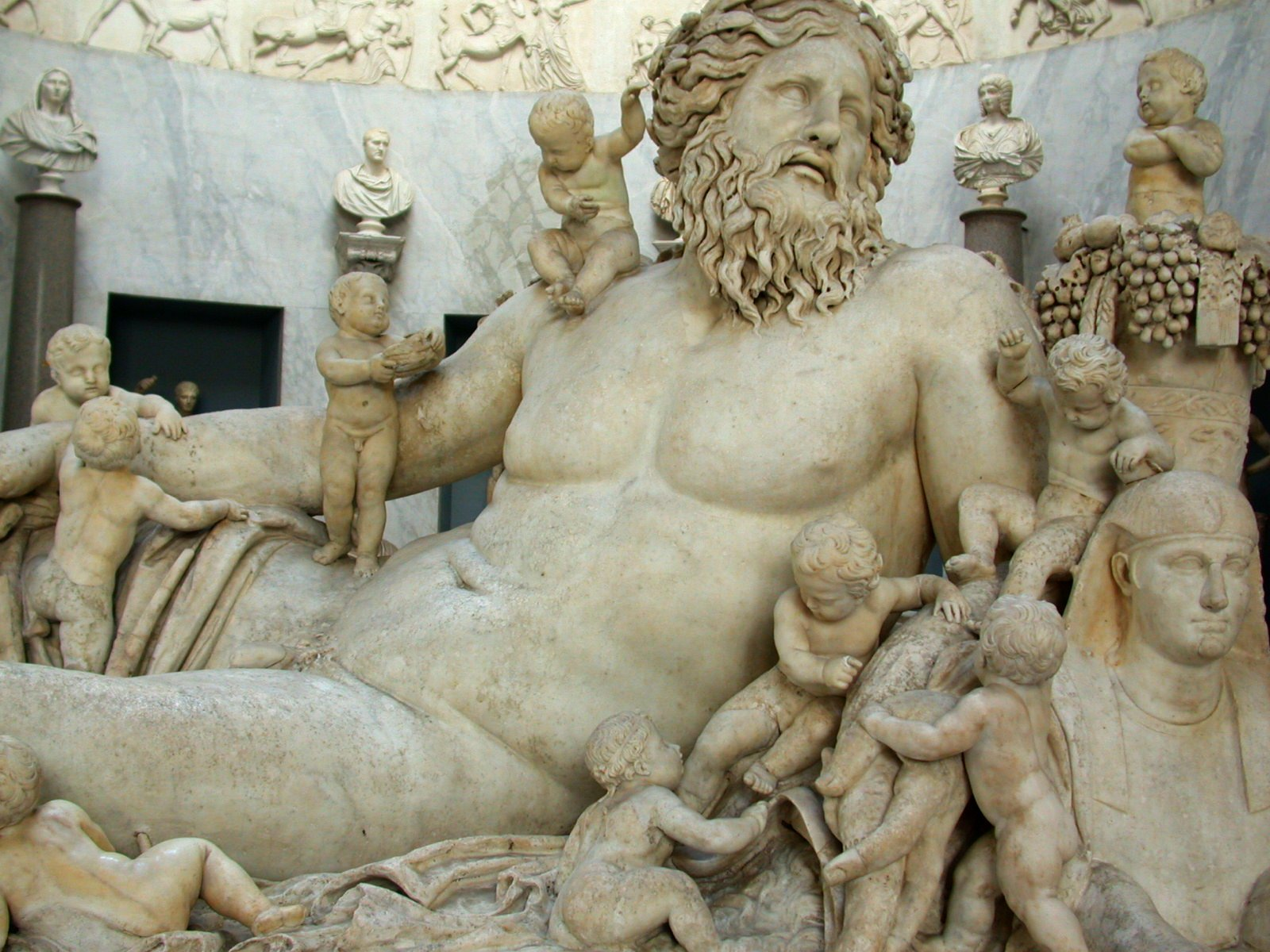
The alternate version located in the Vatican Museums

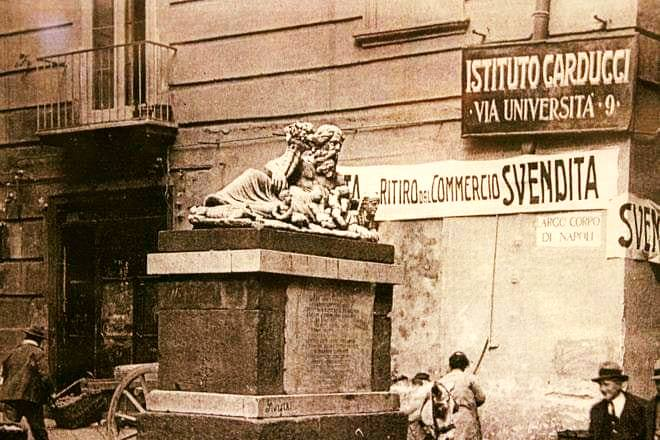
Statue in the first half of the 20th-century
