= Carlo Antonio Broggia =

Italian merchant and economist (1698–1767)

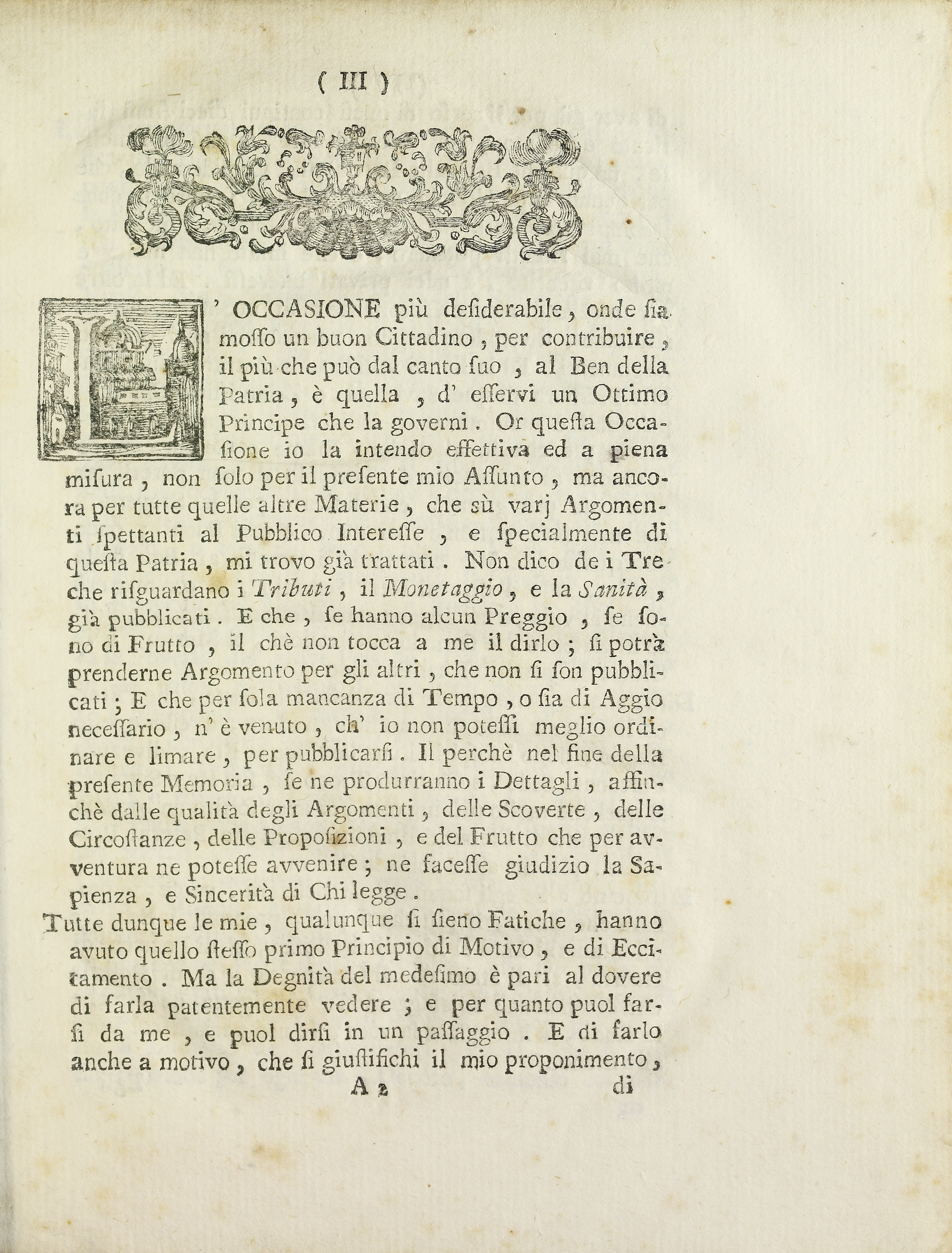
Memoria ad oggetto di varie politiche ed economiche ragioni e temi di utili raccordi, 1754

Carlo Antonio Broggia (1698–1767) was an Italian merchant and economist. Author of many works, he was a reformer and theoretician of taxation.

== Life ==
Carlo was born in Naples, the son of Giuseppe Broggia. In 1717 he moved from Naples to Venice where he lived with his uncle (a priest) for nine years studying business economics. Back to Naples in 1726, he continued his studies under the supervision of Bartolomeo Intieri. He also studied philosophy, particularly Paolo Mattia Doria and Giambattista Vico.

In 1743 Trattato de' tributi, delle monete e del governo politico della sanità was printed. In this book he argues that the tax system should be reformed and based on the individual contributory capacity.

By 1744 he wrote La vita civil-economica, remained unpublished.

In 1754 Broggia wrote Memoria ad oggetto di varie politiche ed economiche ragioni, a controversial book against the fiscal policy imposed by the minister Leopoldo De Gregorio which took him to exile.

Back to Naples in 1761, he wrote Memoria contro il dazio del minutillo in which he expresses his ideas against the export taxes. He died in his home city of Naples.

== Works ==
- Trattato de' tributi, delle monete, e del governo politico della sanità. Naples: Pietro Palombo. 1743.
- Memoria ad oggetto di varie politiche ed economiche ragioni e temi di utili raccordi che in causa del monetaggio di Napoli s'espongono e propongono. Naples. 1754.
