= Santa Maria Assunta dei Pignatelli =

Church in Naples, Italy

Coordinates: 40.848752°N 14.256007°E

Santa Maria Assunta dei Pignatelli is a deconsecrated Roman Catholic church located at the end of Via Nilo (where it intersects Piazzeta Nilo, and runs into via Giovanni Paladino) in Naples, region of Campania, Italy. In the small piazza in front of the church is an ancient Roman statue of the Nile God. It's located near the Santi Marco e Andrea a Nilo church.

== History ==
The church was first built in the 14th century by the Pignatelli family from Toritto as a private chapel attached to their Palazzo Pignatelli di Toritto. This early church was attributed to the architect Andrea Ciccione.

The church was reconstructed and enlarged in 1477 and again in 1736. The interior was frescoed by Fedele Fischetti in the second half of the 18th century. He also painted the Assumption on the main altar. To the left of the altar is the Renaissance tomb of Carlo Pignatelli by Angelo Aniello Fiore. To the right of the altar once stood a painting by Bartolomè Ordonez, now in the Capodimonte Museum. The church is in need of restoration.

Two of the chapels were restored in June 2018. The chapel of Carlo Pignatelli, designed by Malvito in 1506-1507 and the chapel of Caterina Pignatelli, designed by Diego de Silóe im 1513-14. Both chapels have had Baroque refurbishments.

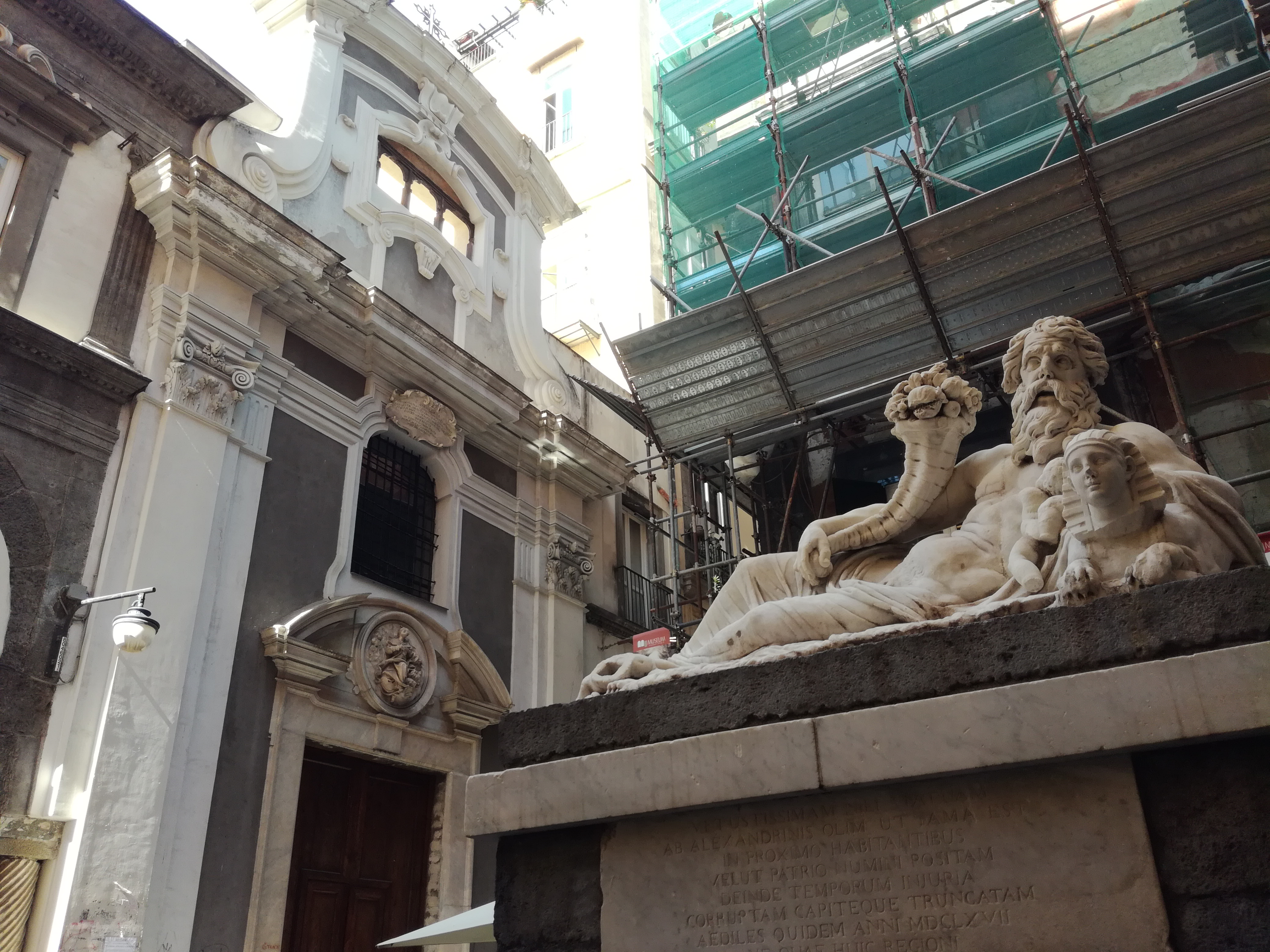
Facade

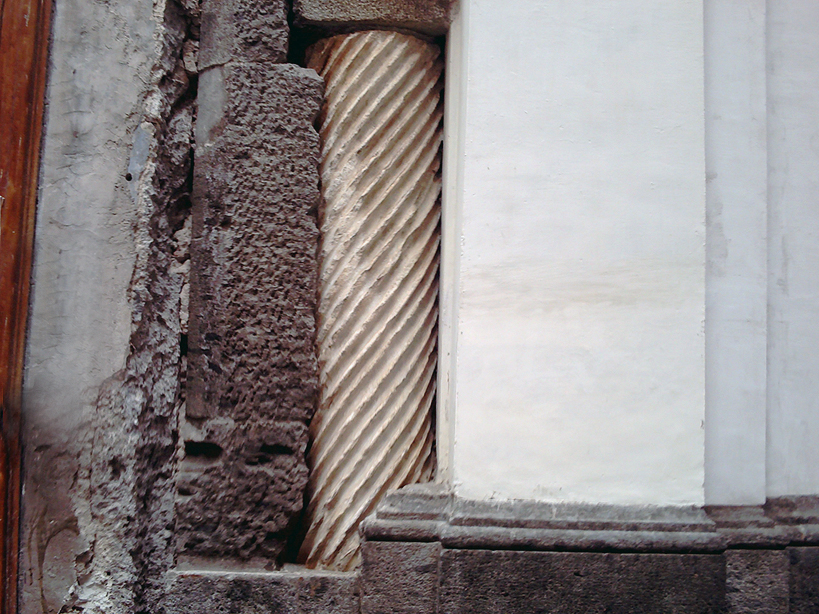
Greek column in lower church

== Bibliography ==
- Vincenzo Regina, Le chiese di Napoli. Viaggio indimenticabile attraverso la storia artistica, architettonica, letteraria, civile e spirituale della Napoli sacra, Newton & Compton editor, Naples 2004.
