= Palazzo d'Afflitto =

Palace in Naples, Italy

Coordinates: 40°50′58.34″N 14°15′20.35″E

The Palazzo D'Afflitto is a palace located in the San Giuseppe neighbourhood of Naples, Italy, adjacent to the Palazzo Capomazza di Campolattaro. It used to belong to the princely family d'Afflitto. In the third floor is the recently restored Church of the Real Monte Manso di Scala, built atop the famed Cappella Sansevero. The palace was built in the 15th century but underwent numerous reconstructions.

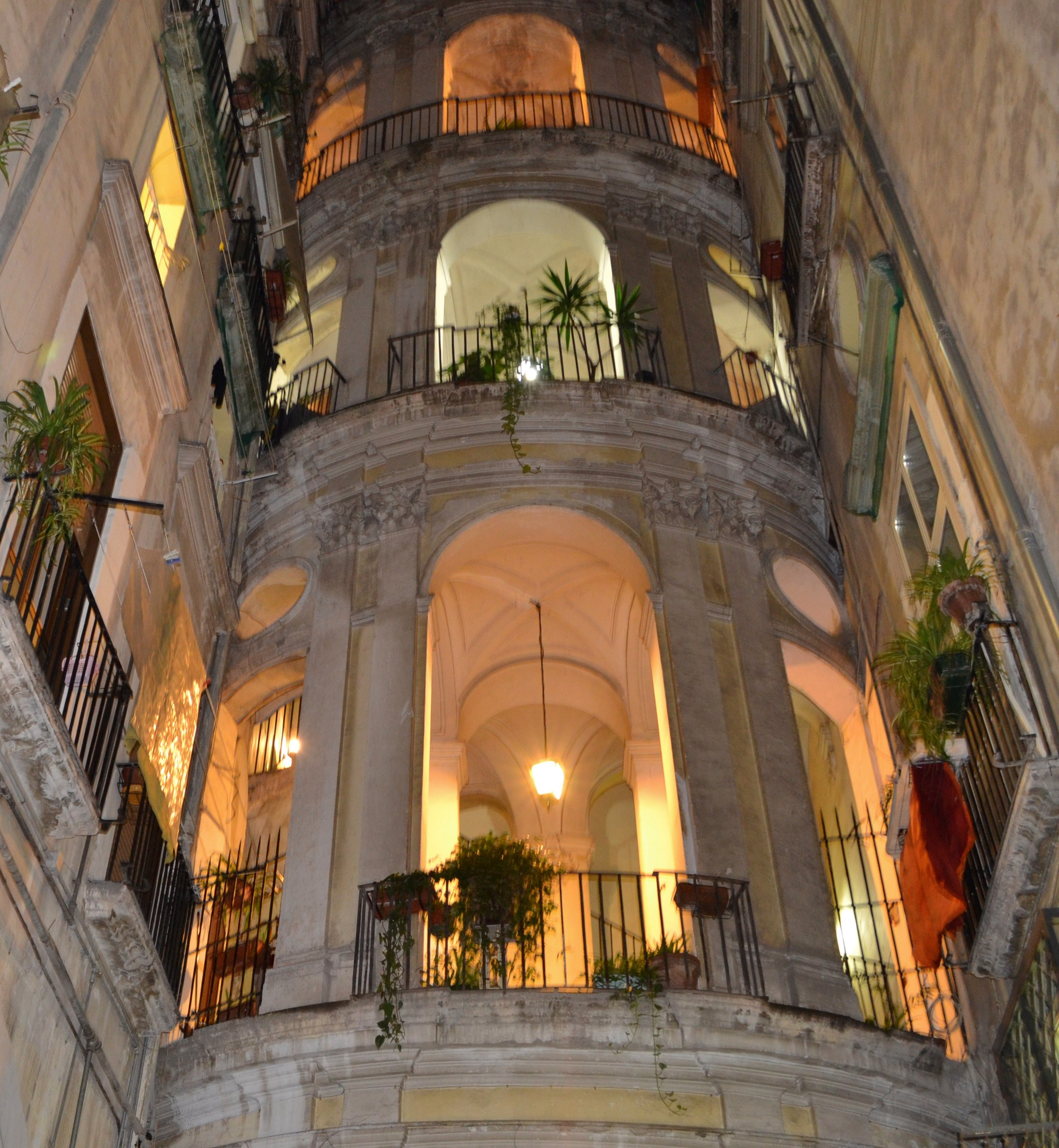
The stairs

== Real Monte Manso di Scala Foundation ==
The Real Monte Manso di Scala Foundation originated in 1608 as a charitable institution patronized by the Marchese di Villa, Giovanni Battista Manso di Scala. The aim was to support the seminary studies of poor aristocrats. Education was entrusted to the Jesuit order. For these purposes the charity acquired the present palace in 1654 from the Principe di Scanno, Girolamo d’Afflitto. Manso in 1611 was also one of the founders of a literary humanist group, Accademia degli Oziosi (Academy of the Idle) in Naples. He was helped in this regard by the Viceroy Don Pedro Fernández de Castro y Andrade, to whom Miguel de Cervantes dedicated many of his works.

In 1747, the charitable foundation also acquired from Raimondo di Sangro, Prince of Sansevero, the area above the Cappella Sansevero, where they built the church, based on designs of Mario Gioffredo. The palace and the seminary archive suffered pillaging during the Napoleonic Wars, and was abolished in 1820, although the charitable foundation continued to exist even to today. One wing of the palace had severe damage during the second world war.

The church had been closed since 1959, and suffered more damage, specially in the maiolica pavement, choir, and ceiling, during the earthquake of 1980. In 2009, the restored church was reopened, and avid to capture some of the tourism to the adjacent chapel, it has organized tours. Of note it contains an altar with statues of the Jesuit Saints Ignatius of Loyola and Francis Xavier, with a canvas of Madonna and child, and Saints by Francesco de Mura. The statue of the Immaculate Conception with putti was completed by Nicola Ingaldi. A new addition is a modern statuary group of Christ Unveiled by Giuseppe Corcione; the statue references the Christ Veiled by Giuseppe Sanmartino in the Capella Sansevero.
